= Hemicordulia kalliste =

Slender emerald

Conservation status
- Data Deficient (IUCN 3.1)

Scientific classification
- Kingdom: Animalia
- Phylum: Arthropoda
- Clade: Pancrustacea
- Class: Insecta
- Order: Odonata
- Suborder: Anisoptera
- Superfamily: Libelluloidea
- Family: Corduliidae
- Genus: Hemicordulia
- Species: H. kalliste

Binomial name
- Hemicordulia kalliste Theischinger & Watson, 1991

Species of dragonfly

Hemicordulia kalliste is a species of dragonfly in the family Corduliidae, known as the slender emerald. It is uncommon and has been found in both Arnhem Land and Cape York, Australia.

Hemicordulia kalliste is a small to medium-sized, black and yellow dragonfly with long legs and a slender abdomen. In both males and females the inboard edge of the hindwing is rounded. Hemicordulia kalliste appears similar to Hemicordulia continentalis.

== Etymology ==
The genus name Hemicordulia is derived from the Greek ἡμι- (hēmi, "half"), combined with Cordulia, a genus name derived from the Greek κορδύλη (kordylē, "club" or "cudgel"). The name refers to the close relationship of the genus to Cordulia.

The species name kalliste is derived from the Greek καλλίστη (kallistē, "most beautiful"). The name commemorates "Kalliste", the home of the late M. A. Lieftinck (1904–1985) and his wife Corrie, in Rhenen, the Netherlands.

== Gallery ==
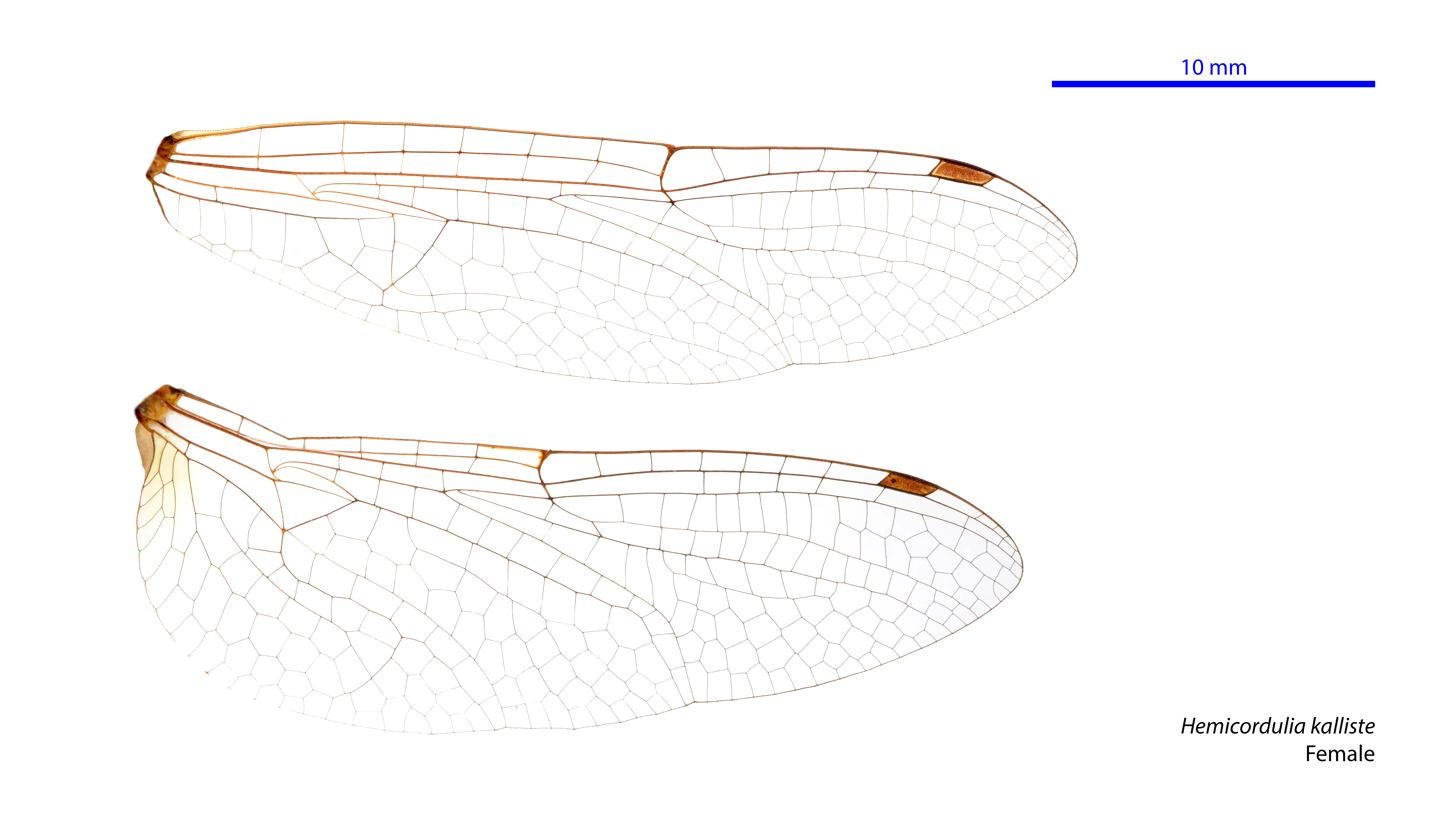
Female wings

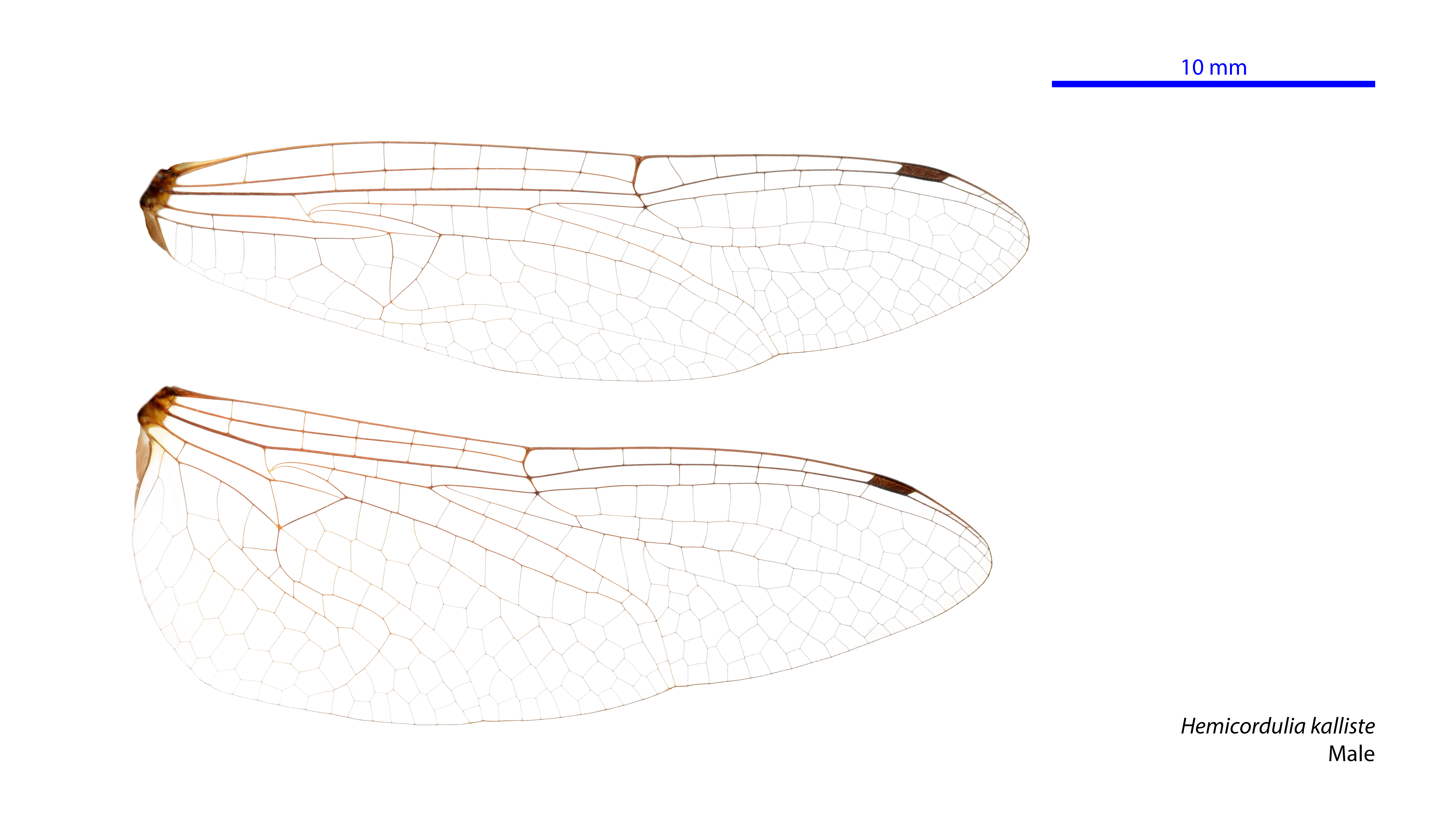
Male wings

== See also ==
- List of dragonflies of Australia
