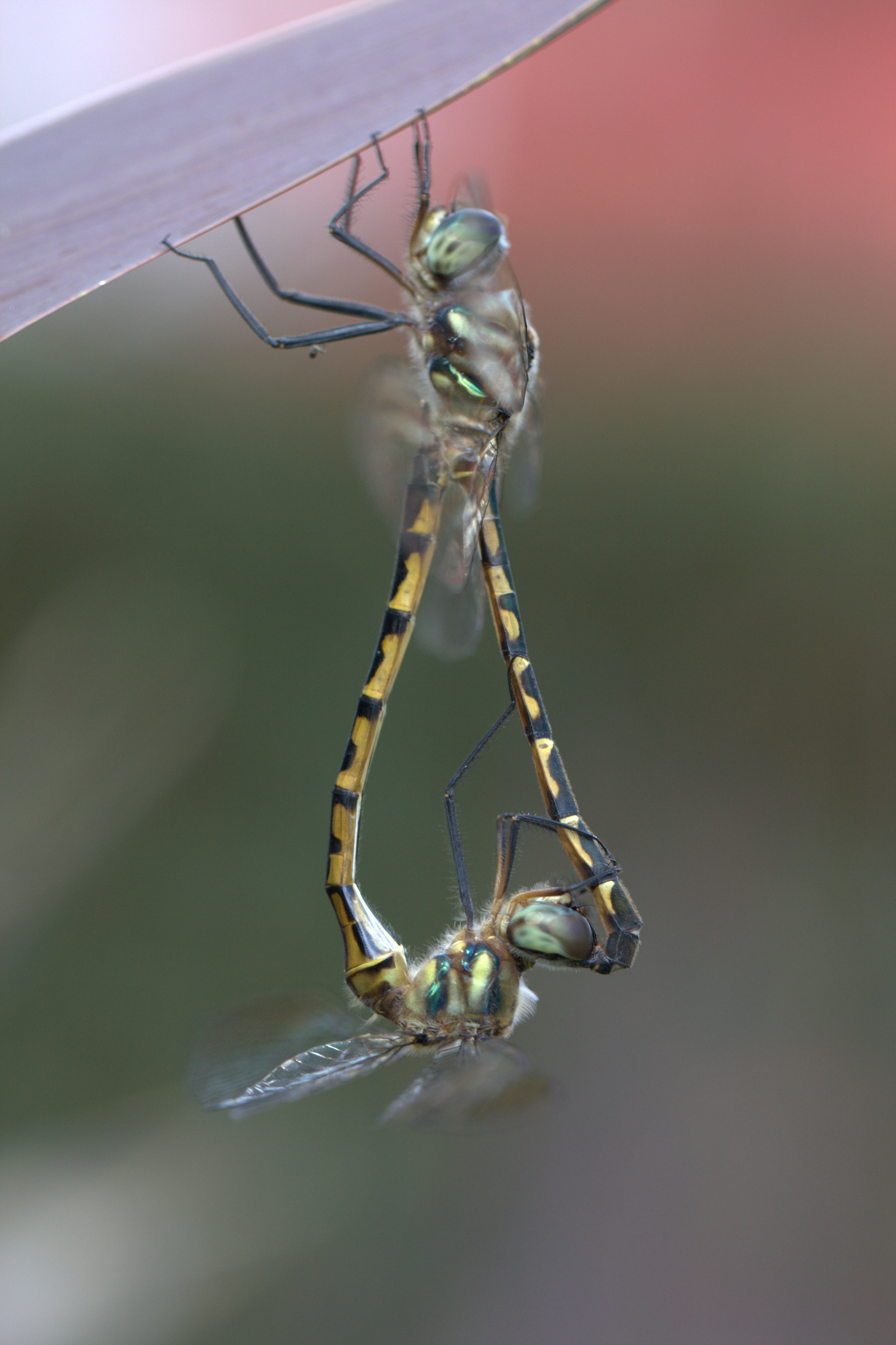

Conservation status
- Least Concern (IUCN 3.1)

Scientific classification
- Kingdom: Animalia
- Phylum: Arthropoda
- Clade: Pancrustacea
- Class: Insecta
- Order: Odonata
- Infraorder: Anisoptera
- Family: Corduliidae
- Genus: Hemicordulia
- Species: H. australiae

Binomial name
- Hemicordulia australiae (Rambur, 1842)

Synonyms
- Cordulia australiae Rambur, 1842; Hemicordulia magica Lieftinck, 1937

= Australian emerald =

Hemicordulia australiae

Species of dragonfly

The Australian emerald (Hemicordulia australiae) is a species of dragonfly in the family Corduliidae. It can be found in Australia, Lord Howe Island, Norfolk Island, Lesser Sunda Islands and New Zealand. It is a small to medium-sized, long-legged dragonfly coloured black-metallic and yellow. In both males and females the inboard edge of the hindwing is rounded.

The Australian emerald appears similar to the tau emerald (Hemicordulia tau).

== Etymology ==
The genus name Hemicordulia is derived from the Greek ἡμι- (hēmi, "half"), combined with Cordulia, a genus name derived from the Greek κορδύλη (kordylē, "club" or "cudgel"). The name refers to the close relationship of the genus to Cordulia.

The species name australiae is Latin for "of Australia", referring to the origin of the original specimens.

== Gallery ==
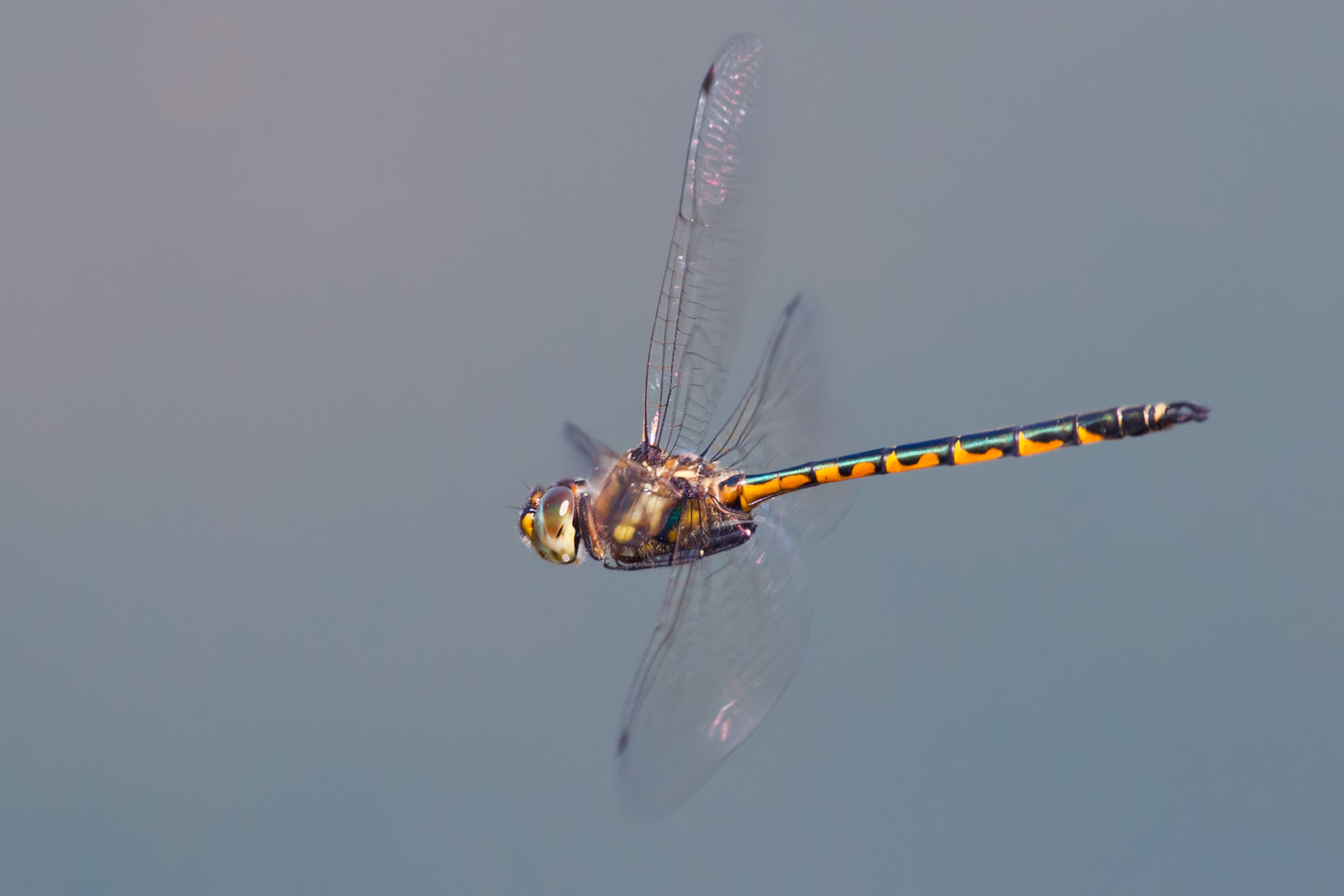
In flight

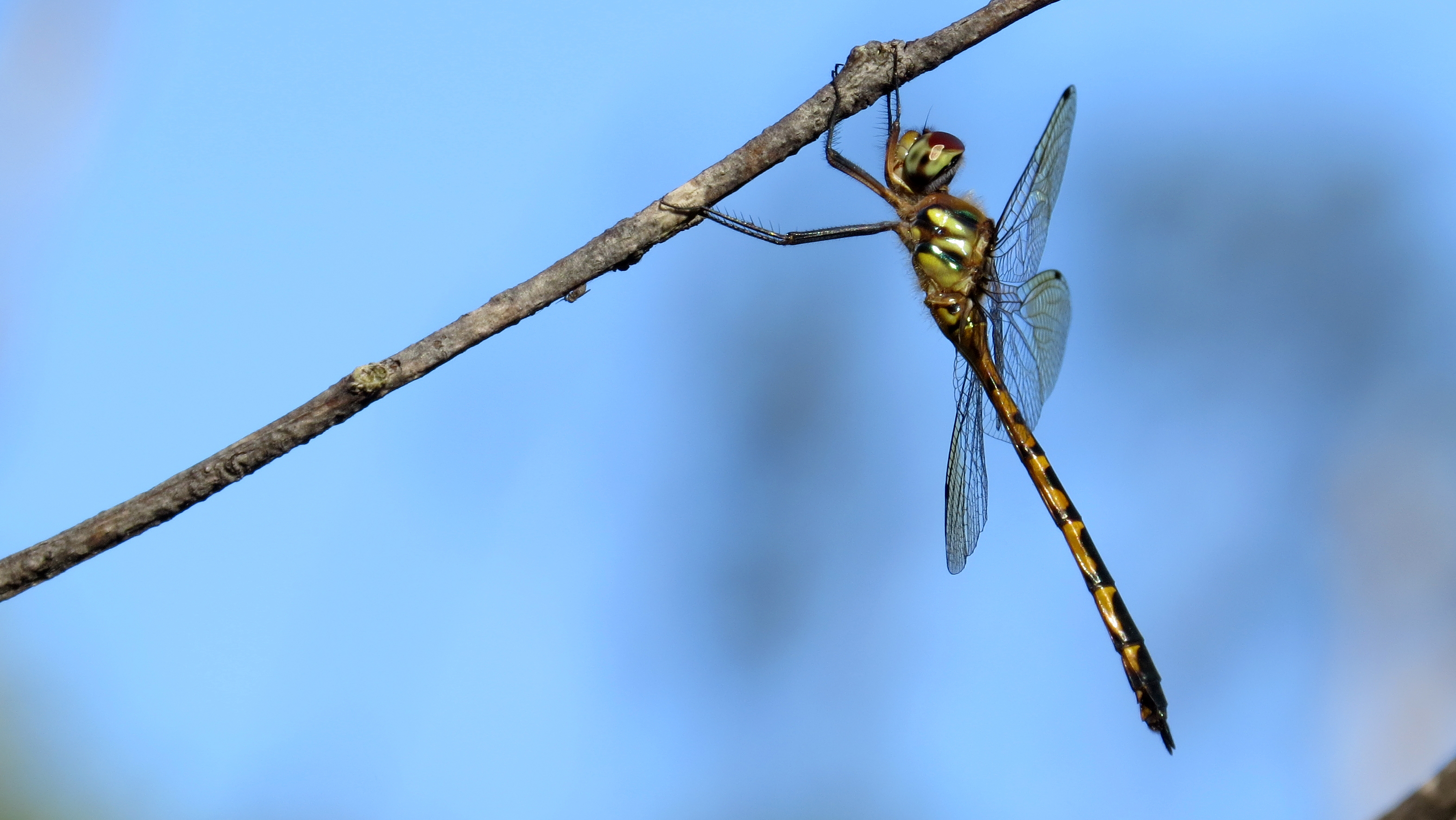
Female

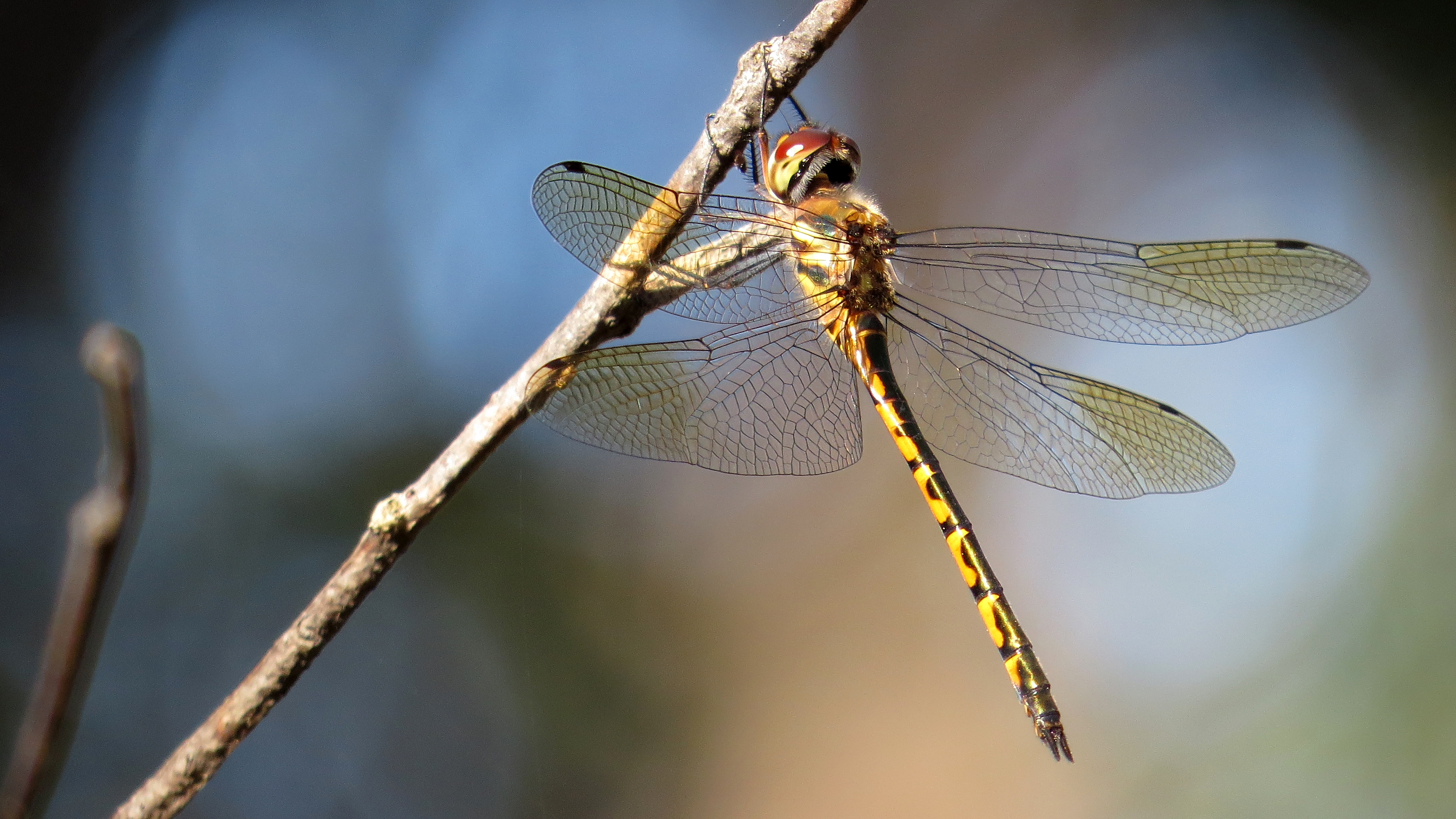
Female

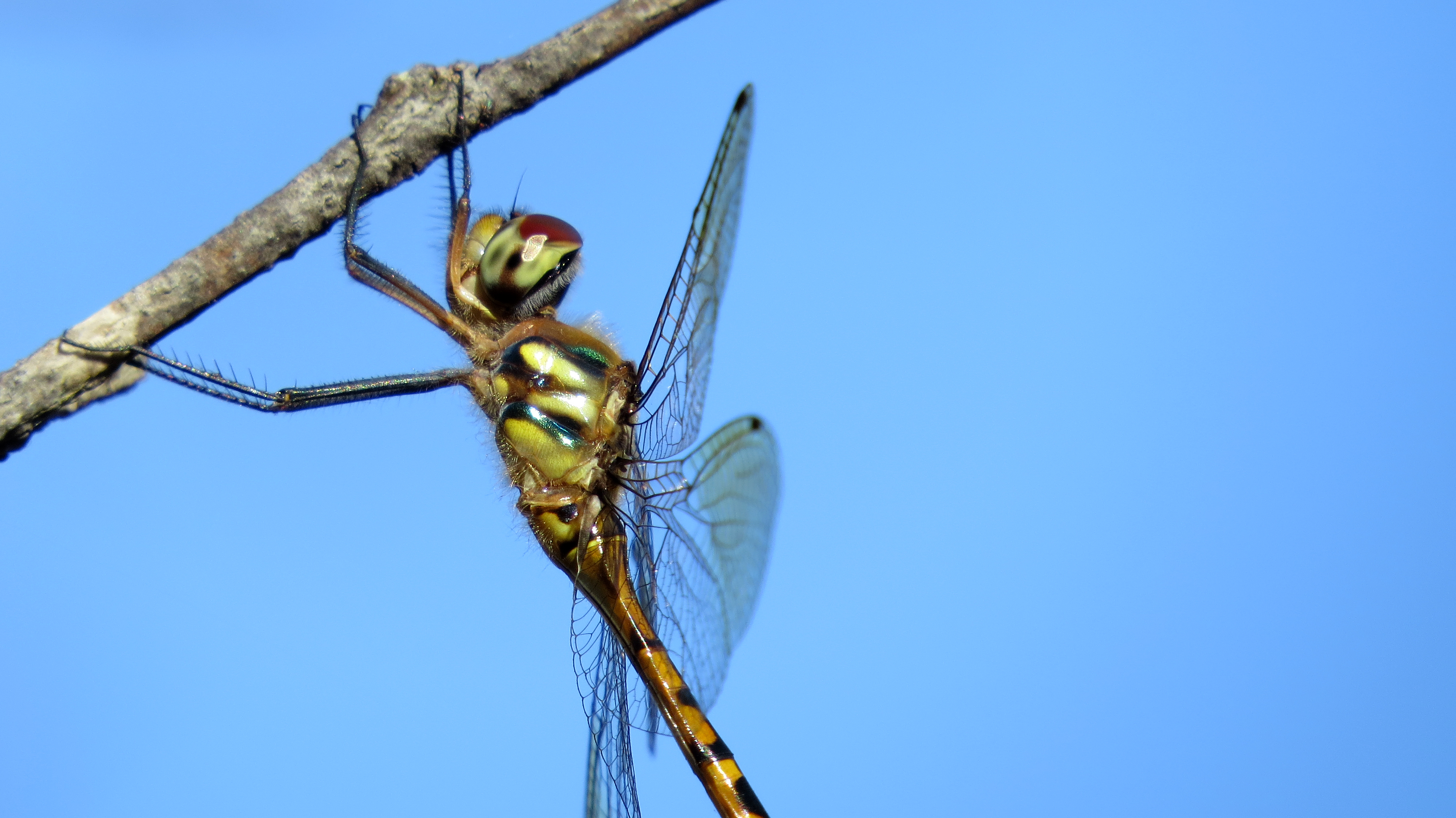
Female detail

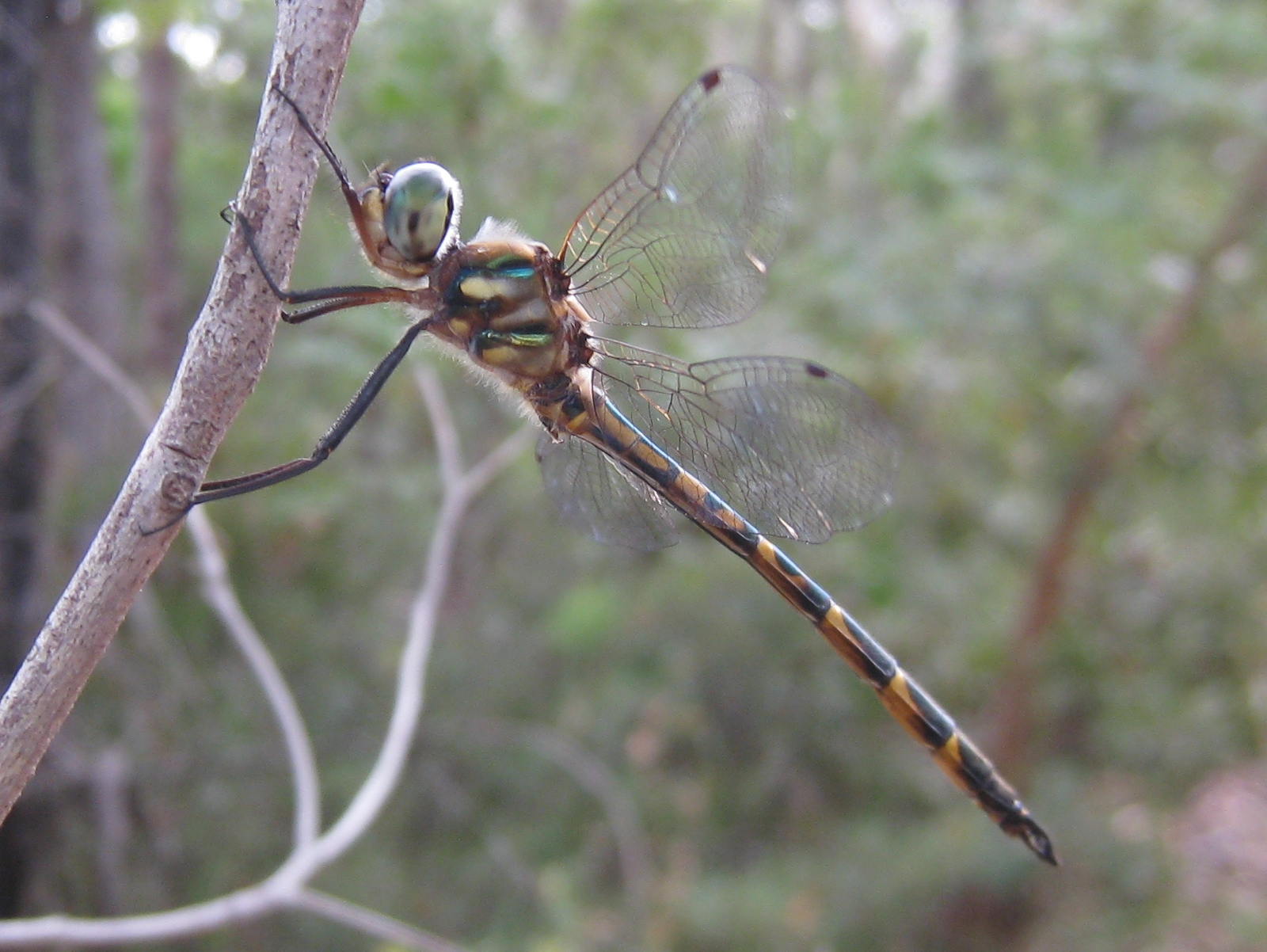
Male

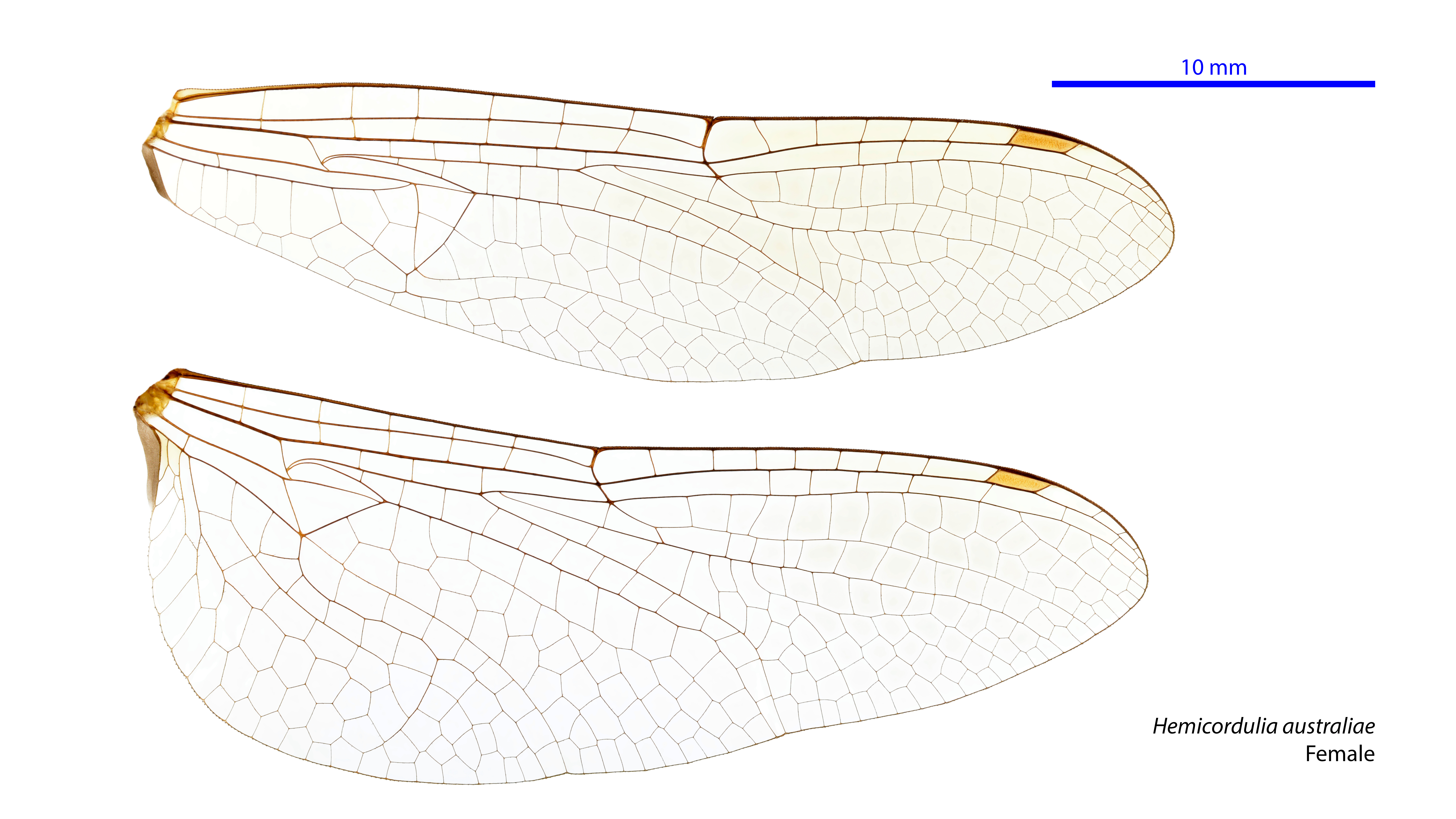
Female wings

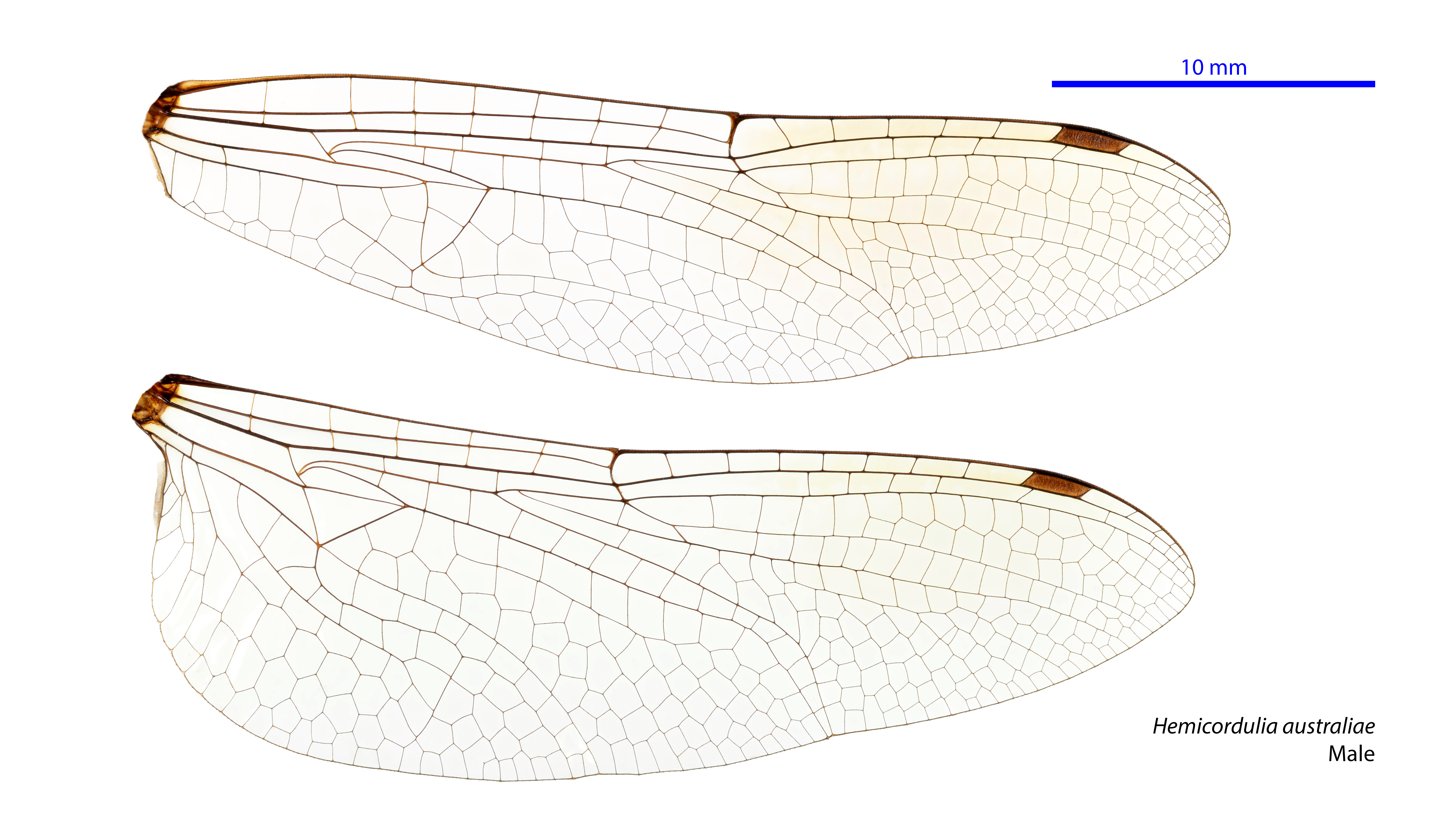
Male wings
