= Hemicordulia koomina =

Conservation status
- Vulnerable (IUCN 3.1)

Scientific classification
- Kingdom: Animalia
- Phylum: Arthropoda
- Clade: Pancrustacea
- Class: Insecta
- Order: Odonata
- Suborder: Anisoptera
- Superfamily: Libelluloidea
- Family: Corduliidae
- Genus: Hemicordulia
- Species: H. koomina

Binomial name
- Hemicordulia koomina Watson, 1969

Species of dragonfly

Hemicordulia koomina is a species of dragonfly in the family Corduliidae, known as the Pilbara emerald. It has been found in the Pilbara region of Western Australia.

Hemicordulia koomina is a small to medium-sized, black and yellow dragonfly with long legs. In both males and females the inboard edge of the hindwing is rounded.

== Etymology ==
The genus name Hemicordulia is derived from the Greek ἡμι- (hēmi, "half"), combined with Cordulia, a genus name derived from the Greek κορδύλη (kordylē, "club" or "cudgel"). The name refers to the close relationship of the genus to Cordulia.

The species name koomina refers to Koomina Pool in the Hamersley Range, Western Australia, where the original specimens were collected and reared from larvae.

== Gallery ==
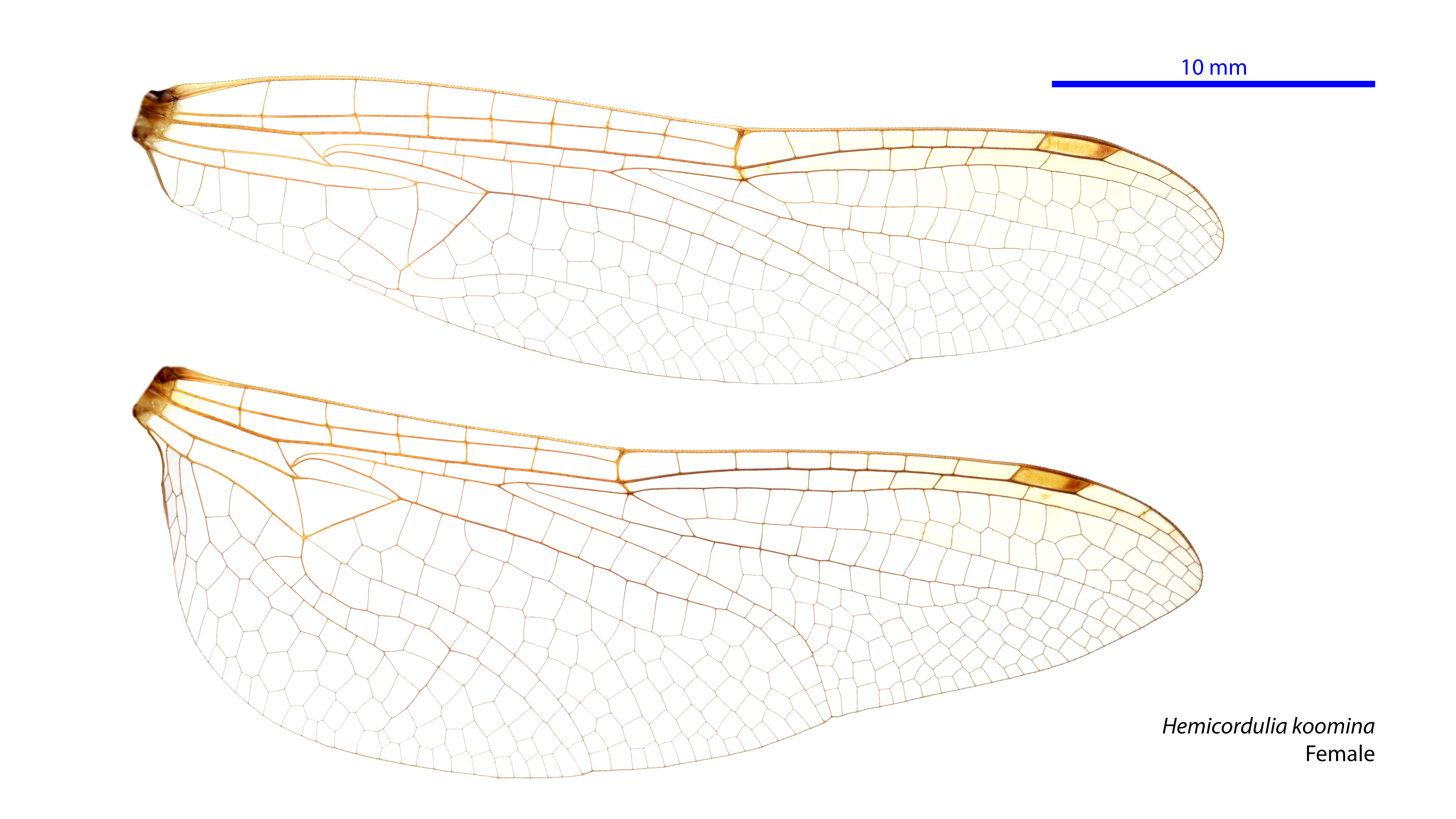
Female wings

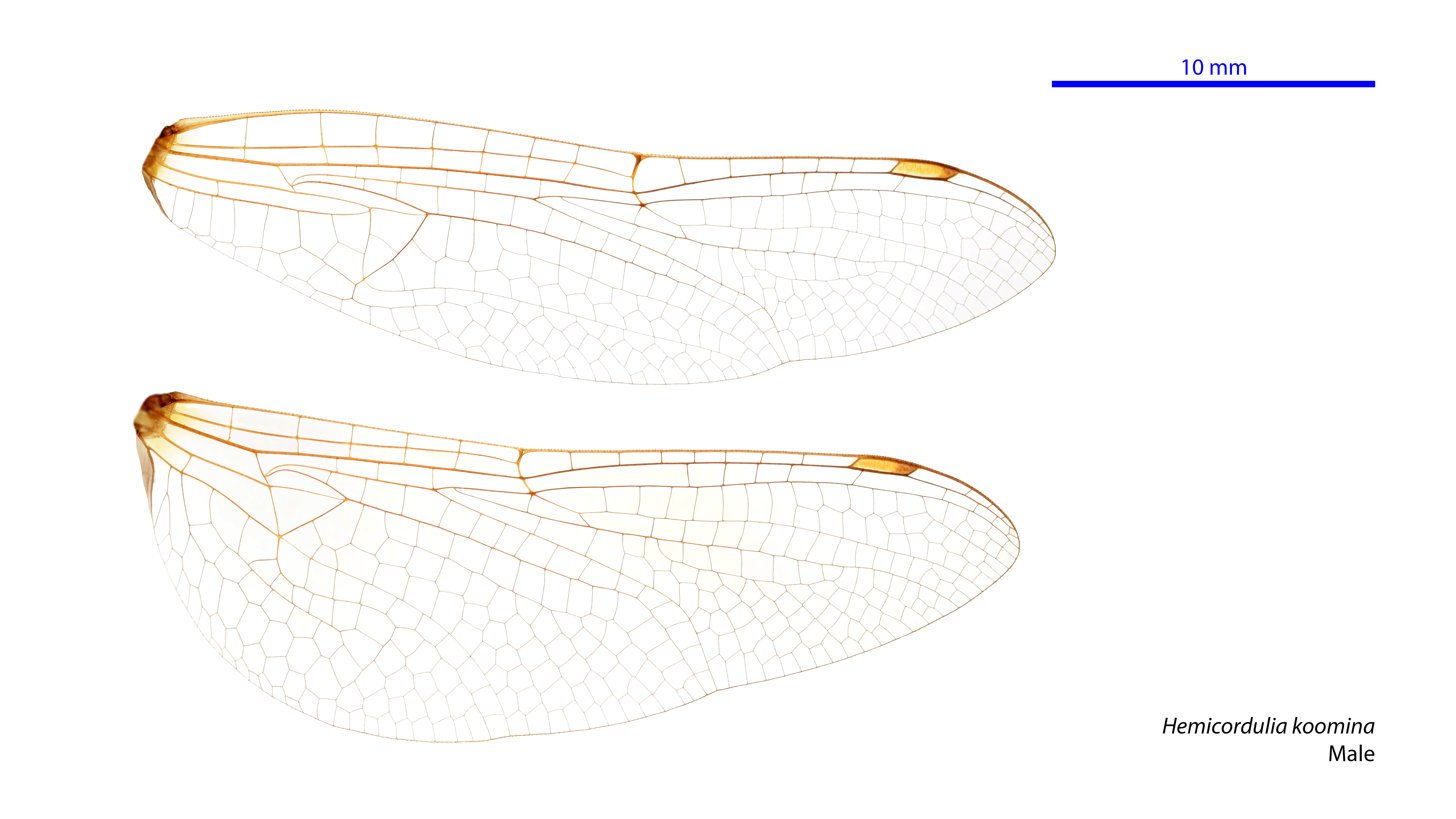
Male wings

== See also ==
- List of dragonflies of Australia
