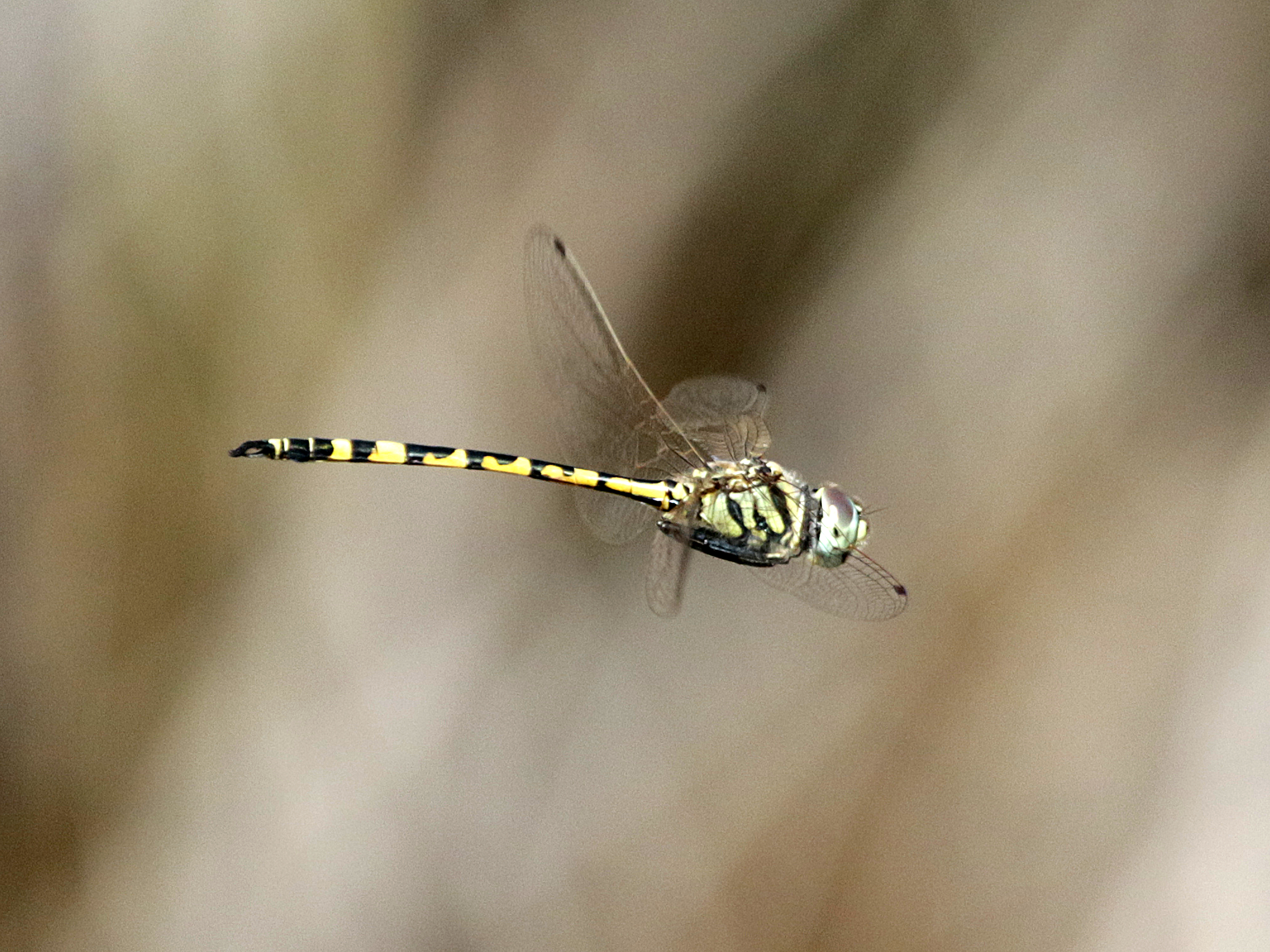
- Male Hemicordulia intermedia in flight, Queensland

Conservation status
- Least Concern (IUCN 3.1)

Scientific classification
- Kingdom: Animalia
- Phylum: Arthropoda
- Clade: Pancrustacea
- Class: Insecta
- Order: Odonata
- Suborder: Anisoptera
- Superfamily: Libelluloidea
- Family: Corduliidae
- Genus: Hemicordulia
- Species: H. intermedia

Binomial name
- Hemicordulia intermedia Selys, 1871

= Hemicordulia intermedia =

Yellow-spotted emerald

Species of dragonfly

Hemicordulia intermedia is a species of dragonfly in the family Corduliidae, known as the yellow-spotted emerald. It inhabits slow flowing rivers, lagoons and ponds across northern Australia.

Hemicordulia intermedia is a small to medium-sized, black and yellow dragonfly with long legs. In both males and females the inboard edge of the hindwing is rounded.

== Etymology ==
The genus name Hemicordulia is derived from the Greek ἡμι- (hēmi, "half"), combined with Cordulia, a genus name derived from the Greek κορδύλη (kordylē, "club" or "cudgel"). The name refers to the close relationship of the genus to Cordulia.

The species name intermedia is derived from the Latin intermedius ("intermediate" or "between"), referring to the species being regarded as intermediate between Hemicordulia tau and Hemicordulia australiae.

== Gallery ==
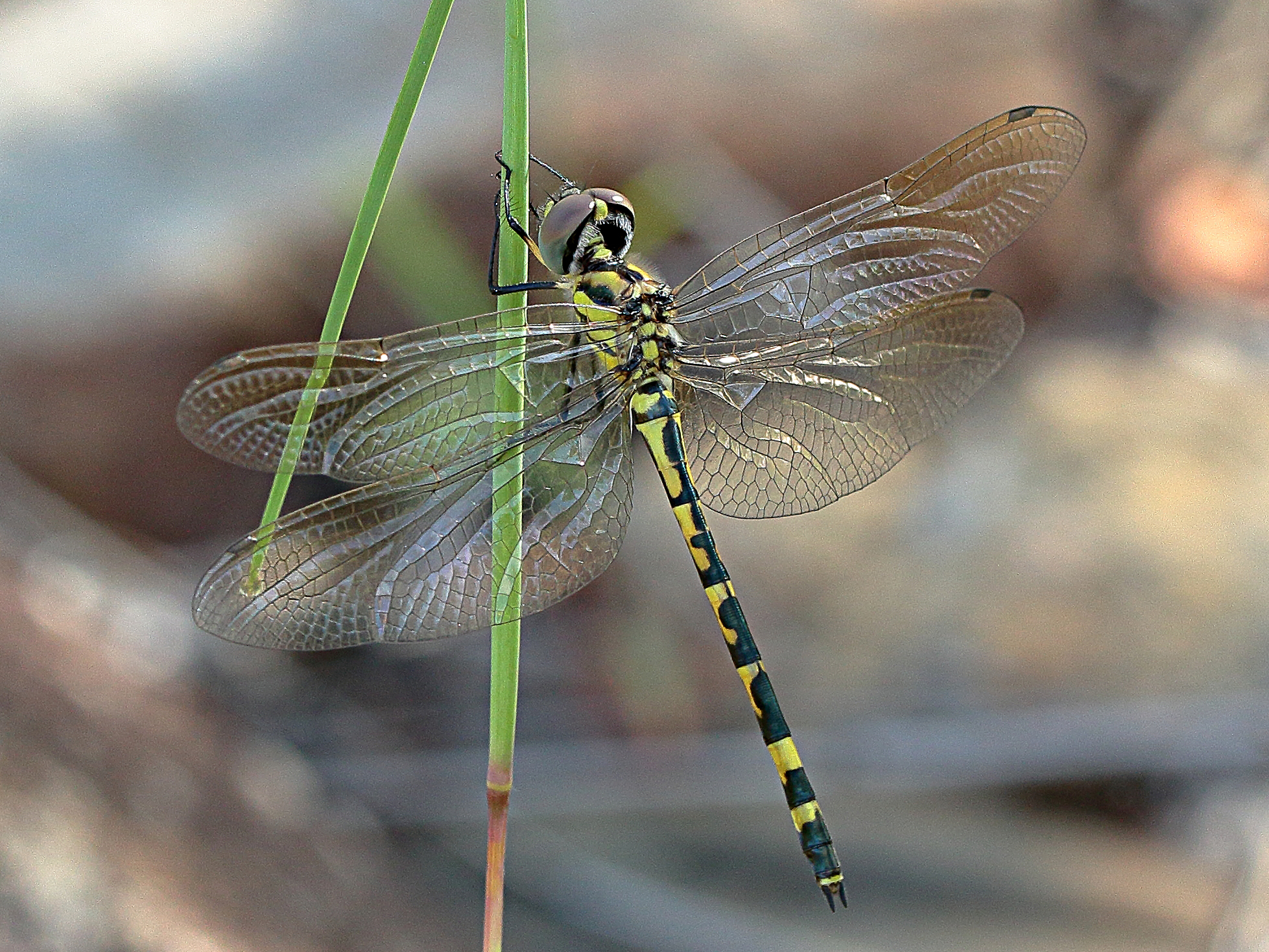
Recently emerged female, North Queensland

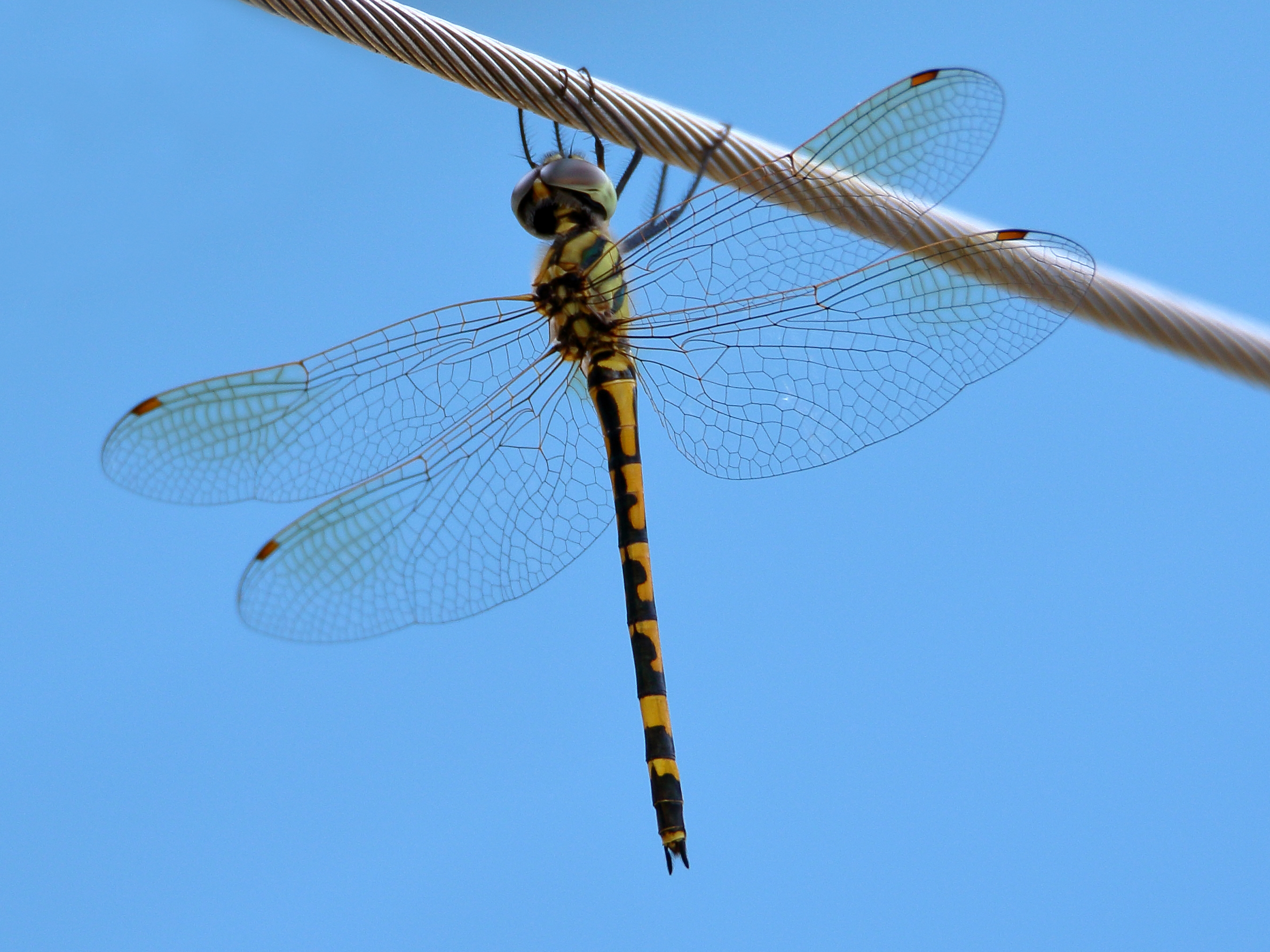
Female in Cairns

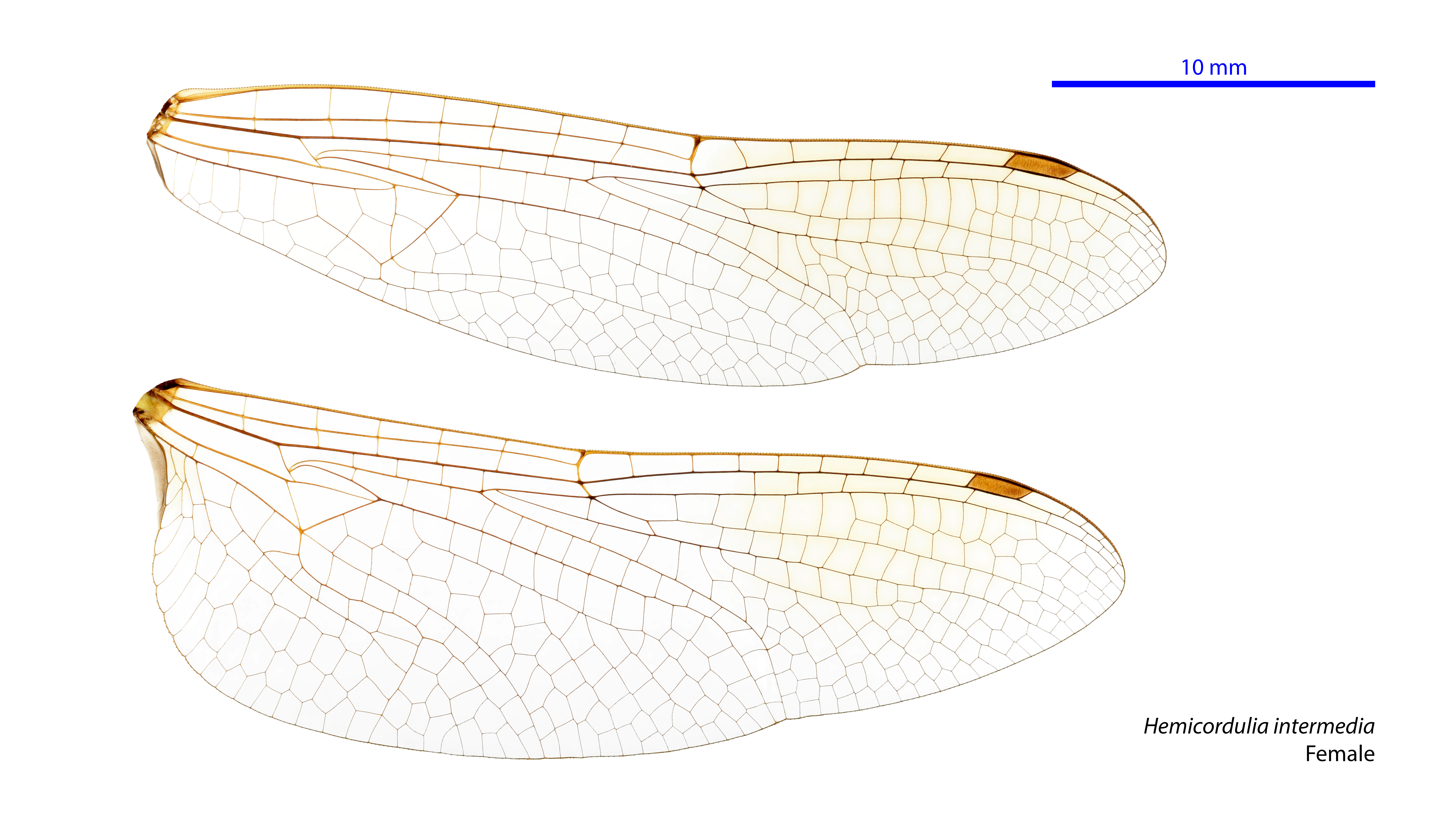
Female wings

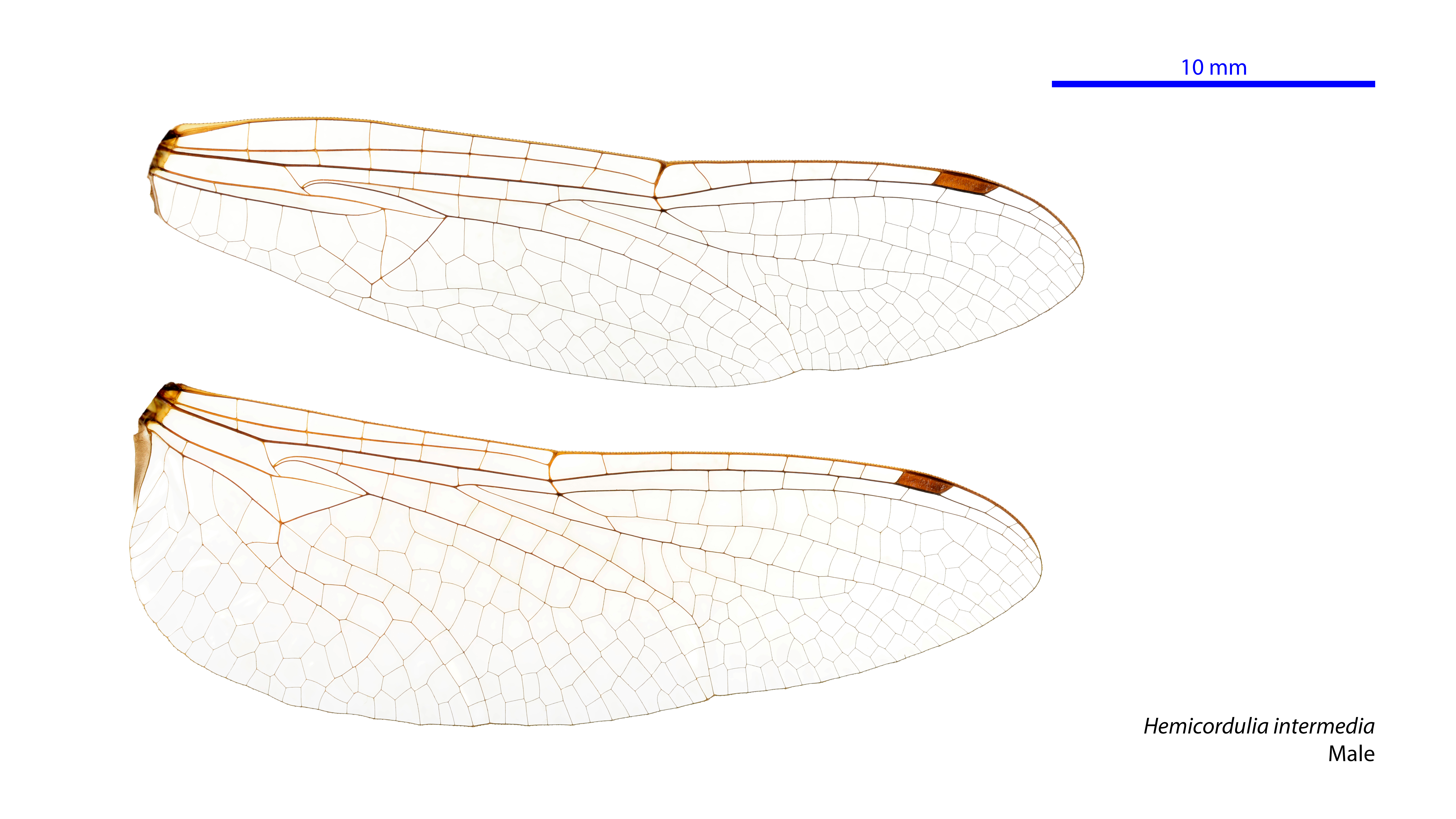
Male wings

== See also ==
- List of dragonflies of Australia
