= Hemicordulia novaehollandiae =

Conservation status
- Data Deficient (IUCN 3.1)

Scientific classification
- Domain: Eukaryota
- Kingdom: Animalia
- Phylum: Arthropoda
- Class: Insecta
- Order: Odonata
- Infraorder: Anisoptera
- Family: Corduliidae
- Genus: Hemicordulia
- Species: H. novaehollandiae

Binomial name
- Hemicordulia novaehollandiae (Selys, 1871)

Species of dragonfly

Hemicordulia novaehollandiae is not formally recognized as a species of dragonfly by collections in Australia. It was originally described as being in the family Corduliidae from Nouvelle-Hollande (Australia) in 1871 by Edmond de Sélys-Longchamps, and the location of the holotype is unknown.
