= Hemicordulia hilaris =

Scientific classification
- Domain: Eukaryota
- Kingdom: Animalia
- Phylum: Arthropoda
- Class: Insecta
- Order: Odonata
- Infraorder: Anisoptera
- Family: Corduliidae
- Genus: Hemicordulia
- Species: H. hilaris

Binomial name
- Hemicordulia hilaris Lieftinck, 1975

Species of insect

Hemicordulia hilaris is a species of Pacific dragonfly in the family Corduliidae, first described by the Dutch entomologist Maurits Lieftinck in 1975. The species is found across the Pacific Islands including Samoa and New Caledonia, with its range extending east to the Cook Islands and French Polynesia.

== Description and habitat ==
Hemicordulia hilaris have brown-green abdomens with a metallic sheen. It can be differentiated from Hemicordulia fidelis, which has a similar appearance, however bright yellow spots on the lower body segments. The species tends to prefer living in sunny, shallow swamps with dene reed beds.
