= Hemicordulia okinawensis =

Conservation status
- Least Concern (IUCN 3.1)

Scientific classification
- Kingdom: Animalia
- Phylum: Arthropoda
- Class: Insecta
- Order: Odonata
- Infraorder: Anisoptera
- Family: Corduliidae
- Genus: Hemicordulia
- Species: H. okinawensis

Binomial name
- Hemicordulia okinawensis Asahina, 1947

Species of dragonfly

Hemicordulia okinawensis is a species of dragonfly in the family Corduliidae. It is endemic to Japan.
