= Hemicordulia ogasawarensis =

Conservation status
- Endangered (IUCN 3.1)

Scientific classification
- Kingdom: Animalia
- Phylum: Arthropoda
- Class: Insecta
- Order: Odonata
- Infraorder: Anisoptera
- Family: Corduliidae
- Genus: Hemicordulia
- Species: H. ogasawarensis

Binomial name
- Hemicordulia ogasawarensis Oguma, 1913

Species of dragonfly

Hemicordulia ogasawarensis is a species of dragonfly in the family Corduliidae. It is endemic to Japan.
