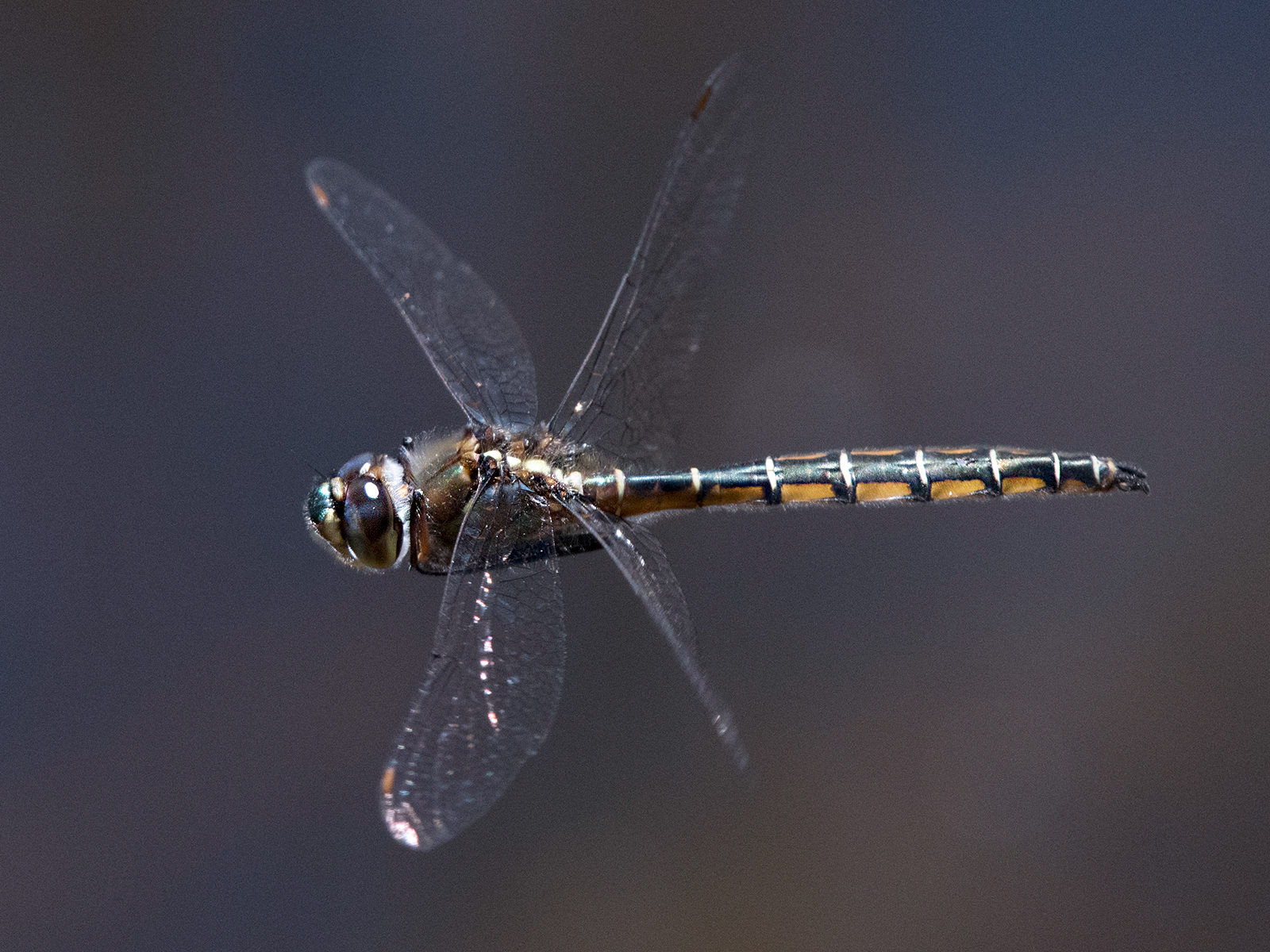
- Male in flight

Conservation status
- Least Concern (IUCN 3.1)

Scientific classification
- Kingdom: Animalia
- Phylum: Arthropoda
- Clade: Pancrustacea
- Class: Insecta
- Order: Odonata
- Suborder: Anisoptera
- Superfamily: Libelluloidea
- Family: Corduliidae
- Genus: Hemicordulia
- Species: H. jacksoniensis

Binomial name
- Hemicordulia jacksoniensis (Rambur, 1842)

Synonyms
- Cordulia jacksoniensis Rambur, 1842; Procordulia jacksoniensis (Rambur, 1842)

= Hemicordulia jacksoniensis =

Eastern swamp emerald

Species of dragonfly

Hemicordulia jacksoniensis, commonly known as the eastern swamp emerald, is a species of dragonfly in the family Corduliidae. It inhabits rivers, pools and lakes in eastern Australia, from Brisbane through New South Wales, Victoria and Tasmania, and around Adelaide in South Australia.

Hemicordulia jacksoniensis is a small to medium-sized black and orange-yellow dragonfly with a thick, flattened tail.

== Taxonomy ==
Until 2025, Hemicordulia jacksoniensis was placed in the genus Procordulia. The IUCN Red List assessment for the species was published under this former name. Following research published in 2025, all species of Procordulia were transferred to Hemicordulia.

== Etymology ==
The genus name Hemicordulia is derived from the Greek ἡμι- (hēmi, "half"), combined with Cordulia, a genus name derived from the Greek κορδύλη (kordylē, "club" or "cudgel"). The name refers to the close relationship of the genus to Cordulia.

The species name jacksoniensis combines "Jackson", referring to Port Jackson, Sydney, with the Latin suffix -ensis ("originating from" or "associated with a place"). The original specimen was probably collected by J. S. C. Dumont d'Urville during the voyage of the Coquille, which visited Port Jackson in 1824.

== Gallery ==
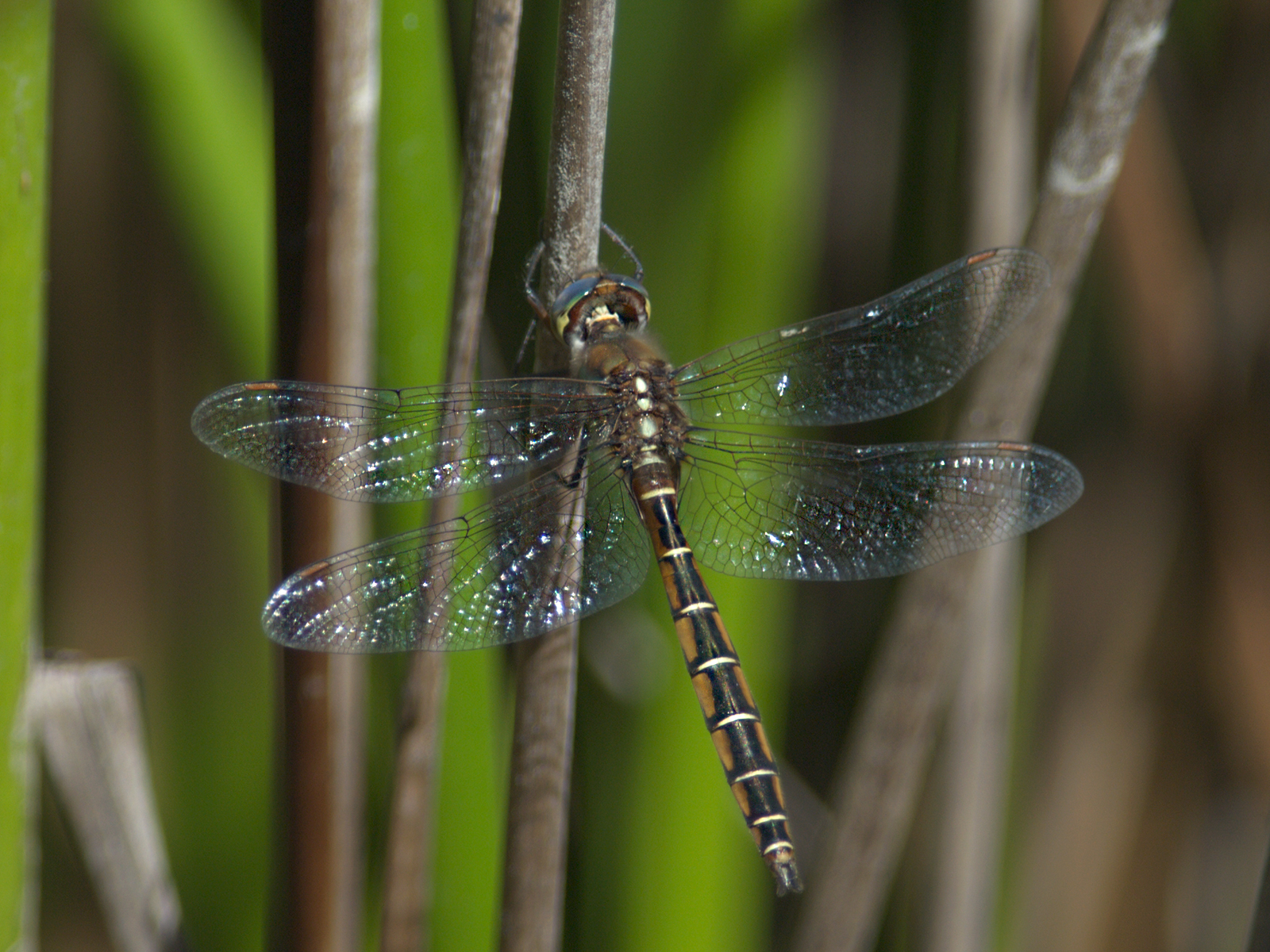
Male

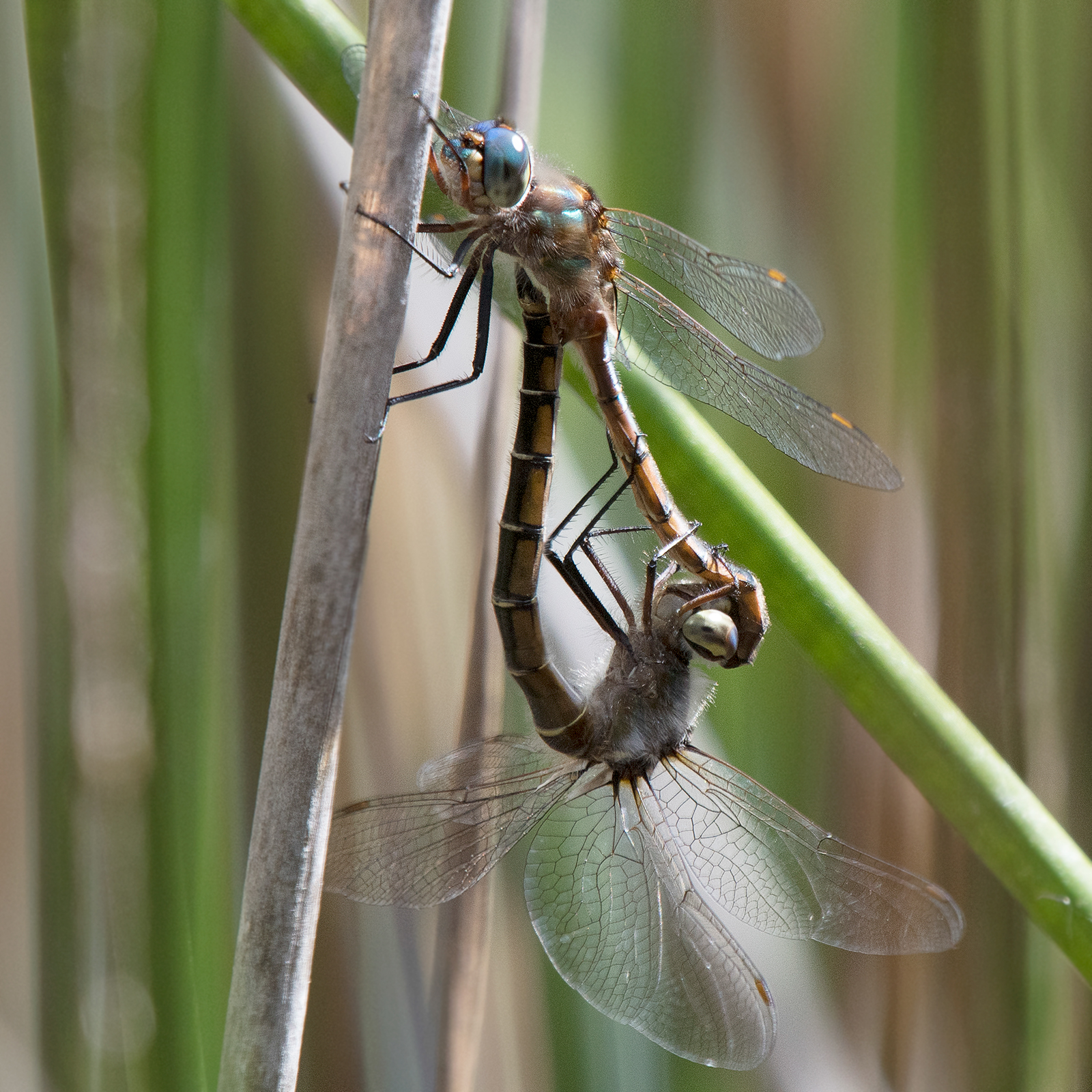
Mating pair, male is on top

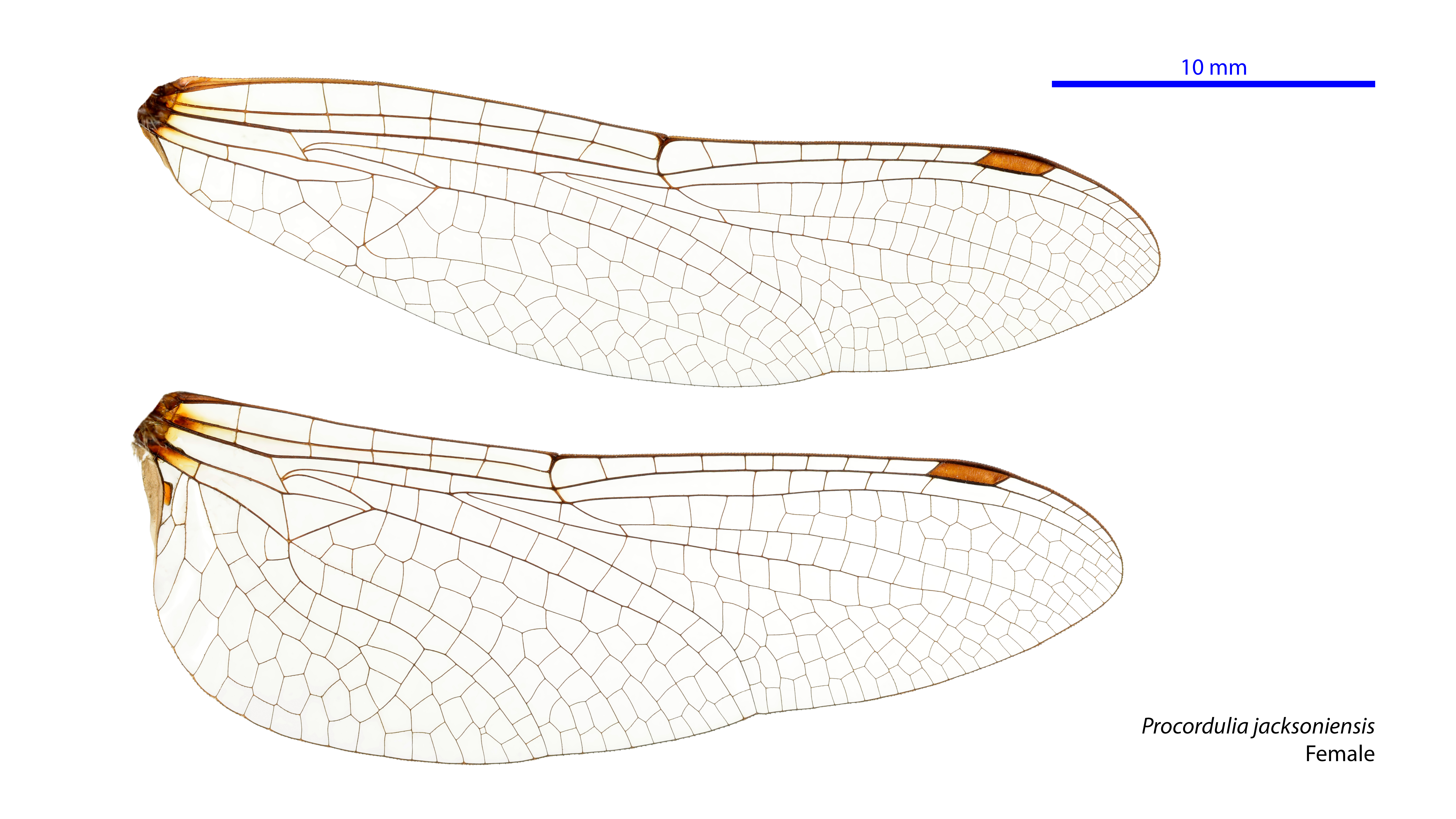
Female wings

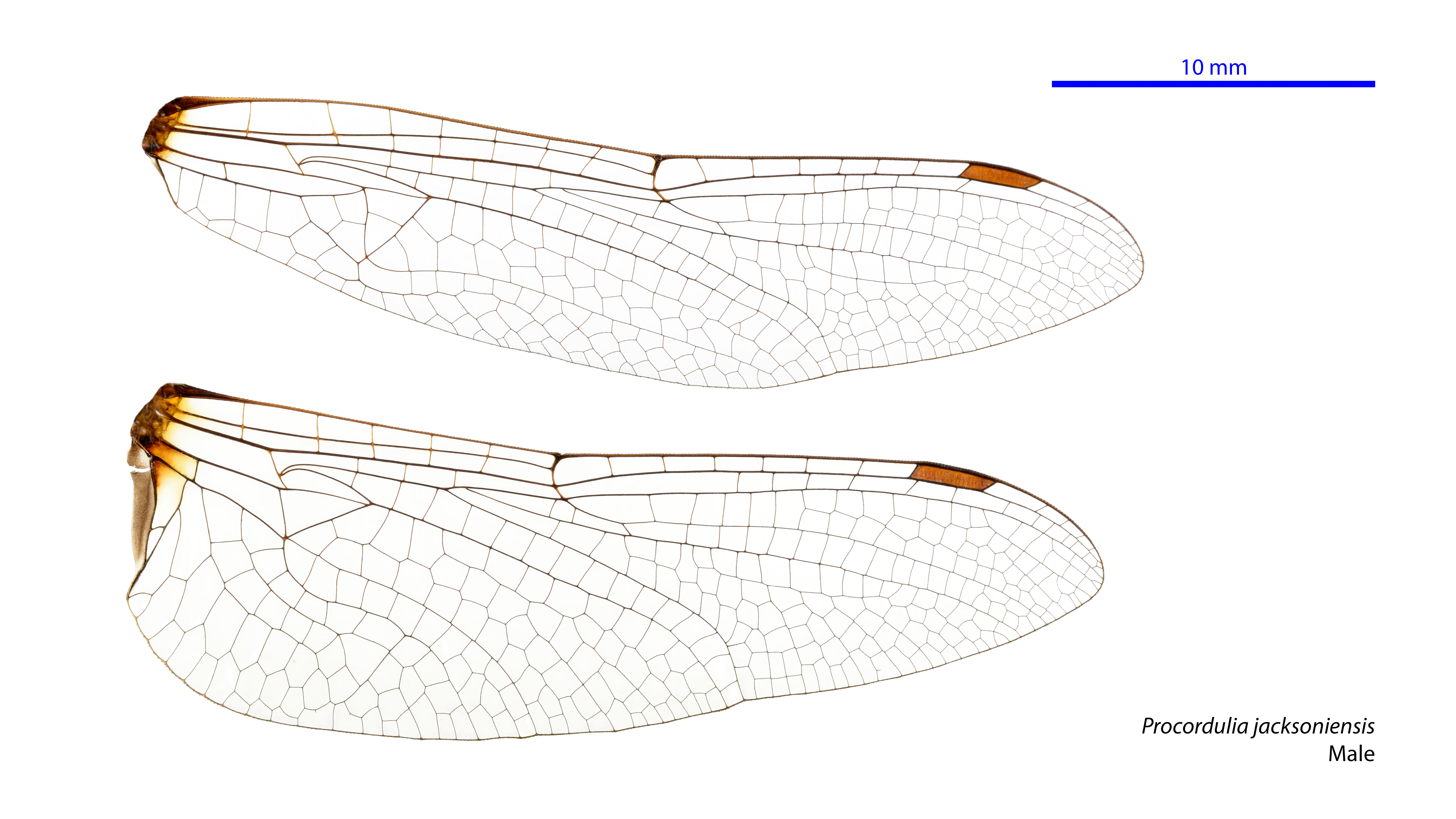
Male wings

== See also ==
- List of dragonflies of Australia
