= Hemicordulia flava =

Desert emerald

Conservation status
- Data Deficient (IUCN 3.1)

Scientific classification
- Kingdom: Animalia
- Phylum: Arthropoda
- Clade: Pancrustacea
- Class: Insecta
- Order: Odonata
- Suborder: Anisoptera
- Superfamily: Libelluloidea
- Family: Corduliidae
- Genus: Hemicordulia
- Species: H. flava

Binomial name
- Hemicordulia flava Theischinger & Watson, 1991

Species of dragonfly

Hemicordulia flava is a species of dragonfly in the family Corduliidae, known as the desert emerald. It inhabits still pools in Central Australia.

Hemicordulia flava is a small to medium-sized, black and yellow dragonfly with long legs. In both males and females the inboard edge of the hindwing is rounded.

== Etymology ==
The genus name Hemicordulia is derived from the Greek ἡμι- (hēmi, "half"), combined with Cordulia, a genus name derived from the Greek κορδύλη (kordylē, "club" or "cudgel"). The name refers to the close relationship of the genus to Cordulia.

The species name flava is derived from the Latin flavus ("yellow"), referring to the extensive yellow colouration.

== Gallery ==
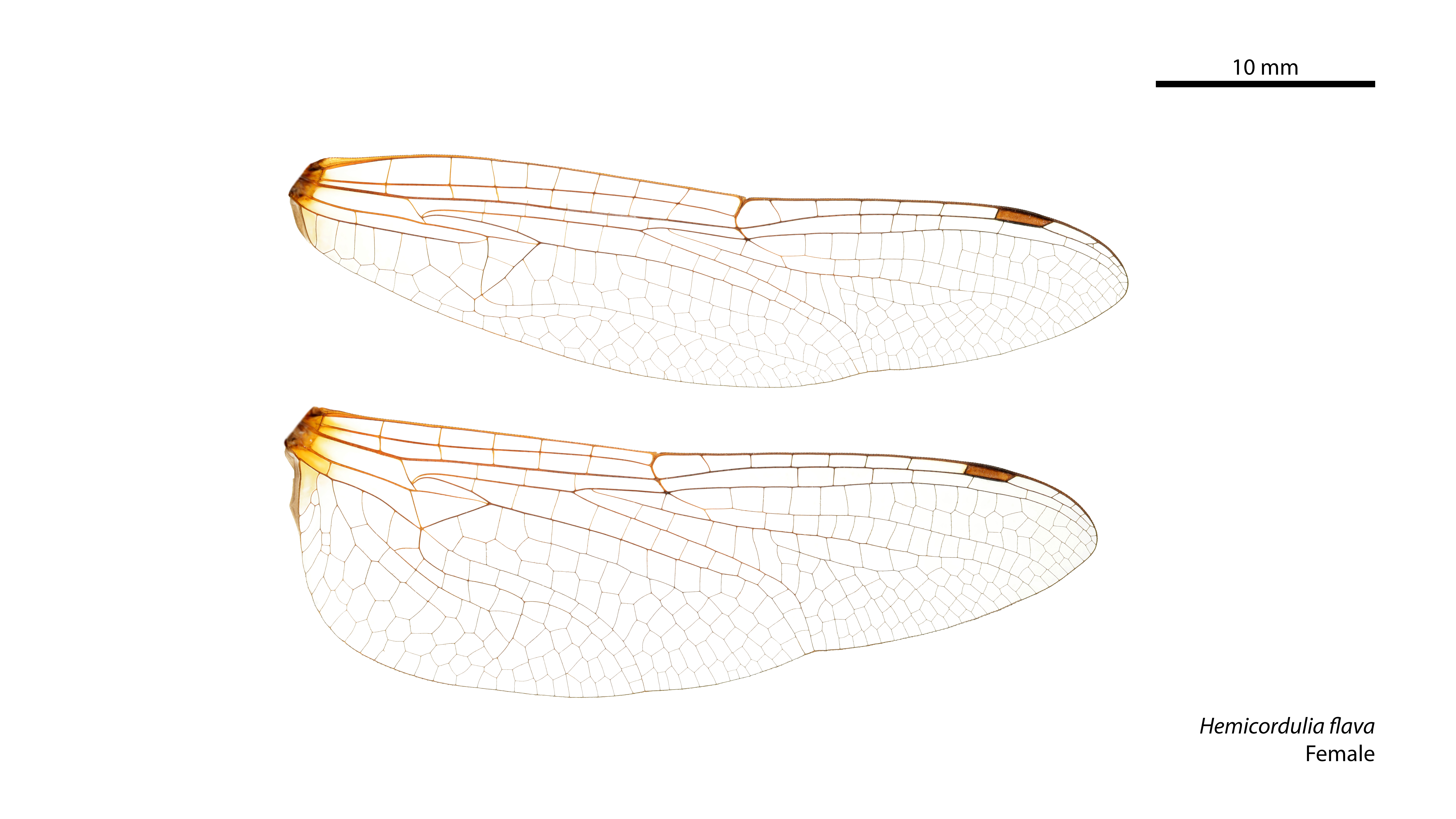
Female wings

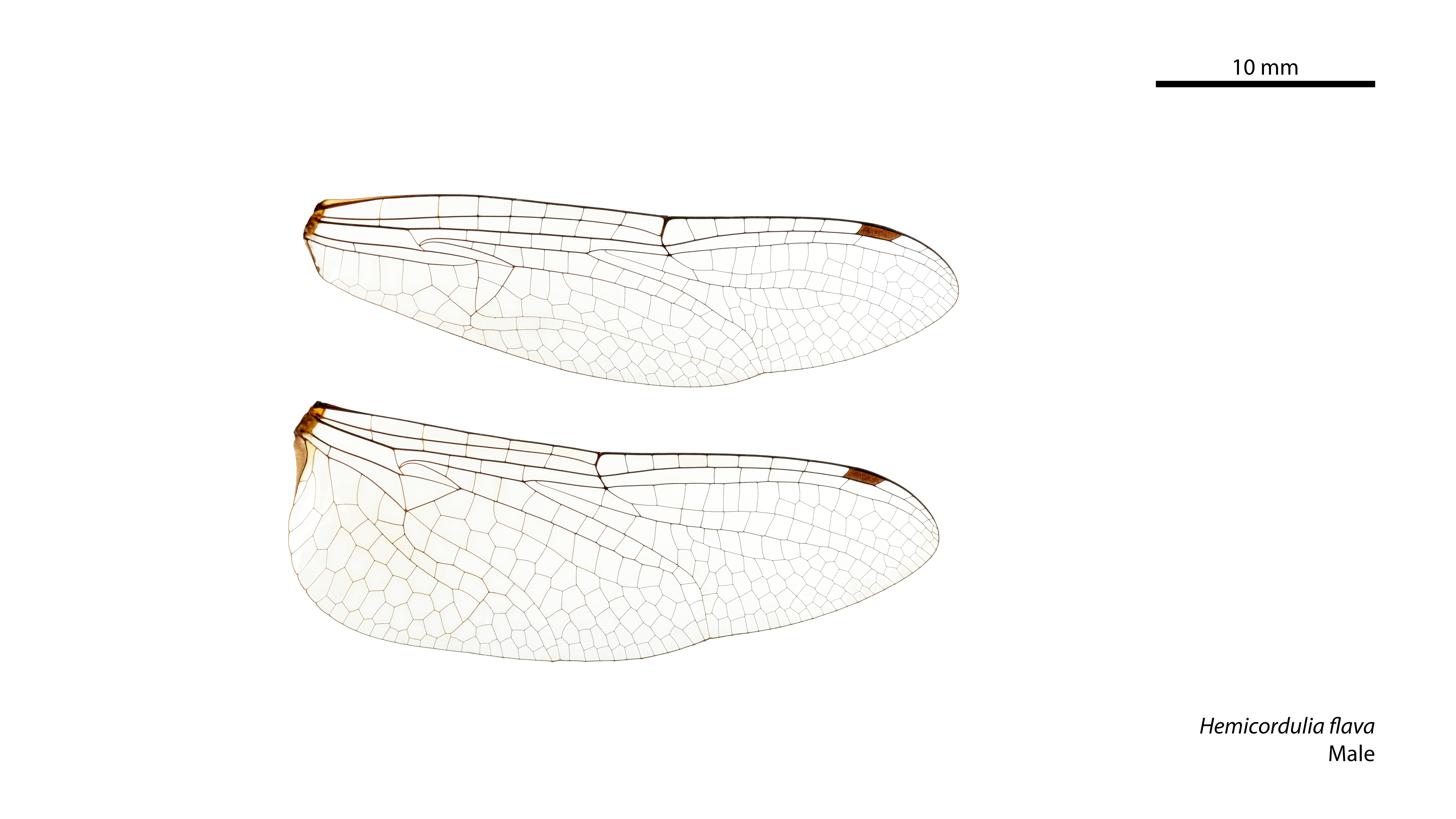
Male wings

== See also ==
- List of dragonflies of Australia
