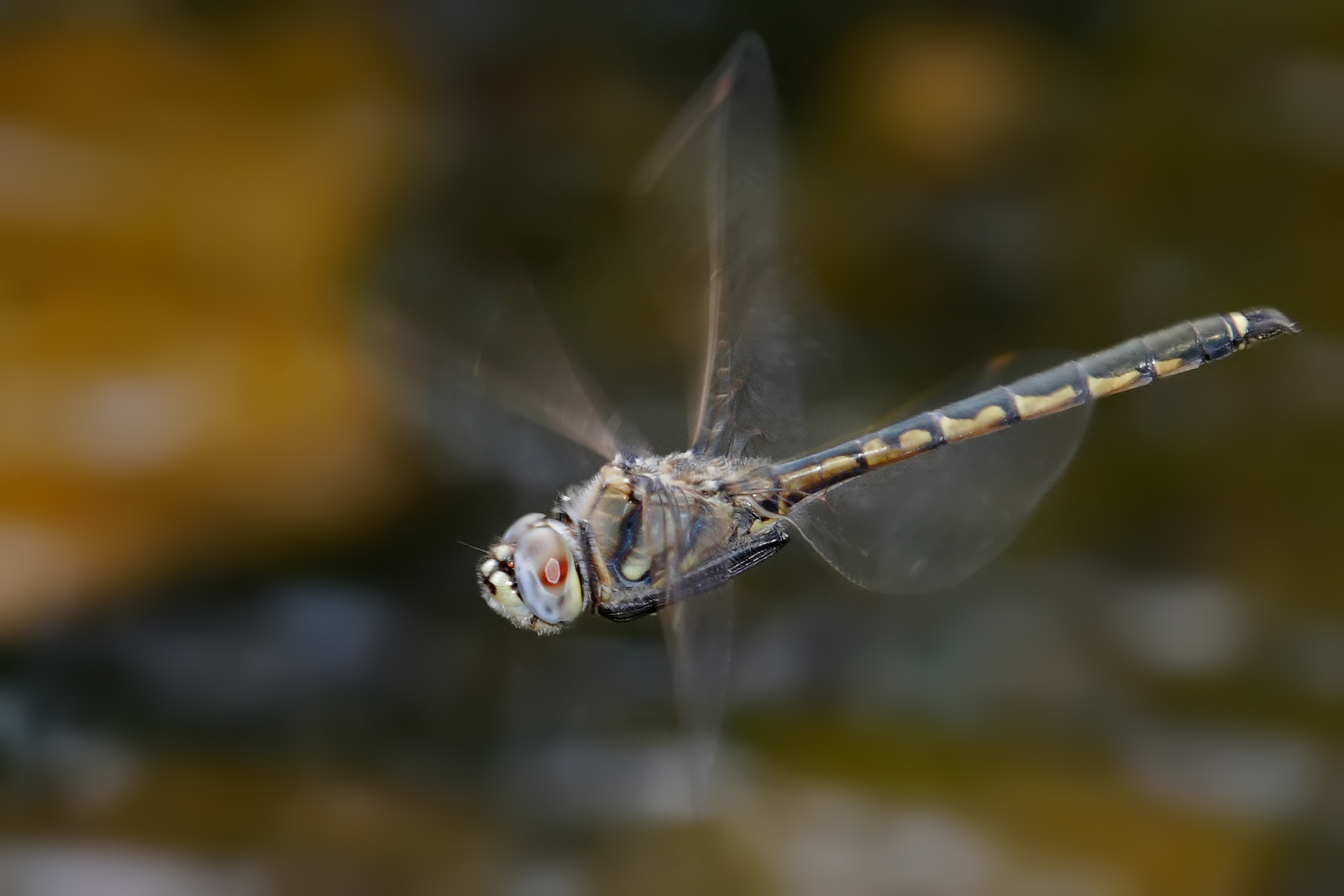
- Hemicordulia tau

Scientific classification
- Kingdom: Animalia
- Phylum: Arthropoda
- Clade: Pancrustacea
- Class: Insecta
- Order: Odonata
- Infraorder: Anisoptera
- Superfamily: Libelluloidea
- Family: Corduliidae
- Subfamily: Corduliinae
- Genus: Hemicordulia; Selys, 1871

= Hemicordulia =

Genus of dragonflies

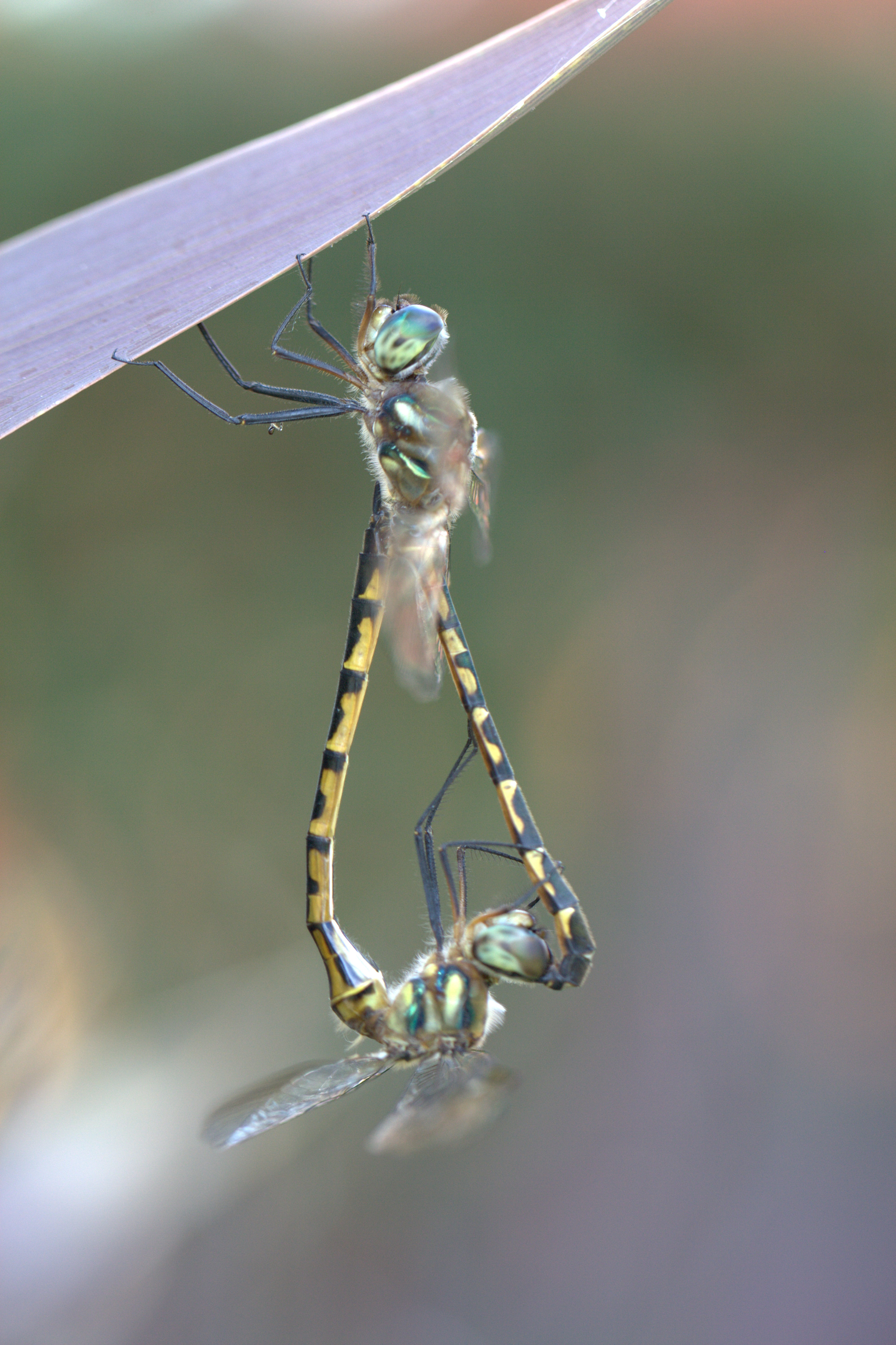
Hemicordulia australiae mating

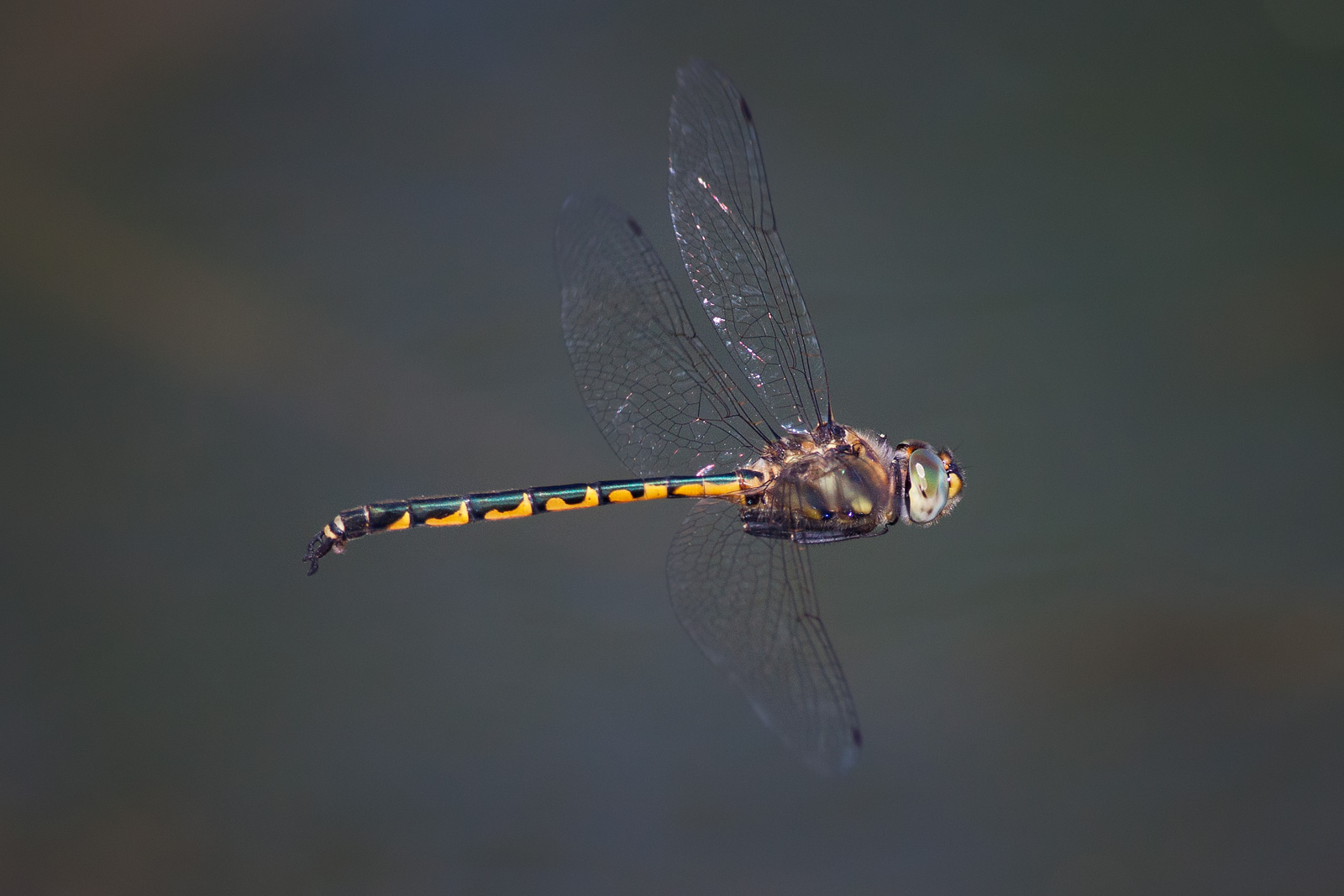
Australian Emerald in midflight

Hemicordulia is a genus of dragonfly in family Corduliidae. It occurs in Africa, southern Asia, Australasia and Pacific Islands such as the Bonin Islands, Fiji and French Polynesia. Species of Hemicordulia are small to medium-sized dragonflies, coloured black or metallic, with yellow.

Following current research, Hemicordulia now includes species that had until recently been included in the genus Procordulia.

== Etymology ==
The genus name Hemicordulia is derived from the Greek ἡμι- (hēmi, "half"), combined with Cordulia, a genus name derived from the Greek κορδύλη (kordylē, "club" or "cudgel"). The name refers to the close relationship of the genus to Cordulia.

== Species ==
The genus Hemicordulia contains the following species:

- Hemicordulia affinis (Selys, 1871) – western swamp emerald
- Hemicordulia africana Dijkstra, 2007 – African emerald
- Hemicordulia apoensis Asahina, 1980
- Hemicordulia armstrongi Rowe, 2019
- Hemicordulia artemis (Lieftinck, 1930)
- Hemicordulia asahinai (Karube, 1997)
- Hemicordulia asiatica Selys, 1878
- Hemicordulia assimilis Hagen in Selys, 1871
- Hemicordulia astridae (Lieftinck, 1935)
- Hemicordulia atrovirens Dijkstra, 2007
- Hemicordulia australiae (Rambur, 1842) – Australian emerald
- Hemicordulia chrysochlora Lieftinck, 1953
- Hemicordulia continentalis Martin, 1906 – fat-bellied emerald
- Hemicordulia cupricolor Fraser, 1927
- Hemicordulia cyclopica Lieftinck, 1942
- Hemicordulia edai Karube & Katatani, 2012
- Hemicordulia eduardi Lieftinck, 1953
- Hemicordulia ericetorum Lieftinck, 1942
- Hemicordulia erico Asahina, 1940
- Hemicordulia fidelis McLachlan, 1886
- Hemicordulia flava Theischinger & Watson, 1991 – desert emerald
- Hemicordulia fusiformis (Lieftinck, 1977)
- Hemicordulia grayi (Selys, 1871) – yellow spotted dragonfly
- Hemicordulia haluco Asahina, 1940
- Hemicordulia hilaris Lieftinck, 1975
- Hemicordulia hilbrandi Lieftinck, 1942
- Hemicordulia intermedia Selys, 1871 – yellow-spotted emerald
- Hemicordulia irregularis (Martin, 1907)
- Hemicordulia jacksoniensis (Rambur, 1842) – eastern swamp emerald
- Hemicordulia kalliste Theischinger & Watson, 1991 – slender emerald
- Hemicordulia karnyi (Fraser, 1926)
- Hemicordulia koomina Watson, 1969 – Pilbara emerald
- Hemicordulia leopoldi (Fraser, 1932)
- Hemicordulia lompobatang (van Tol, 1997)
- Hemicordulia lulico Asahina, 1940
- Hemicordulia mindana Needham & Gyger, 1937
- Hemicordulia moroensis (Lieftinck, 1977)
- Hemicordulia mumfordi Needham, 1933
- Hemicordulia novaehollandiae (Selys, 1871)
- Hemicordulia oceanica Selys, 1871
- Hemicordulia ogasawarensis Oguma, 1913
- Hemicordulia okinawensis Asahina, 1947
- Hemicordulia olympica Lieftinck, 1942
- Hemicordulia pacifica Fraser, 1925
- Hemicordulia papandayanensis (van Tol, 1997)
- Hemicordulia rantemario (van Tol, 1997)
- Hemicordulia sambawana (Förster, 1899)
- Hemicordulia silvarum Ris, 1913
- Hemicordulia similis (Rambur, 1842)
- Hemicordulia smithii (White in White & Gardiner, 1846) – ranger dragonfly
- Hemicordulia superba Tillyard, 1911 – superb emerald
- Hemicordulia sylvia (Lieftinck, 1935)
- Hemicordulia tau Selys, 1871 – tau emerald
- Hemicordulia tenera Lieftinck, 1930
- Hemicordulia teramotoi Yokoi, 2015
- Hemicordulia toxopei Lieftinck, 1926
- Hemicordulia tuiwawai Marinov, 2019
- Hemicordulia valevahalo (Marinov, 2016)
- Hemicordulia virens (Rambur, 1842)
