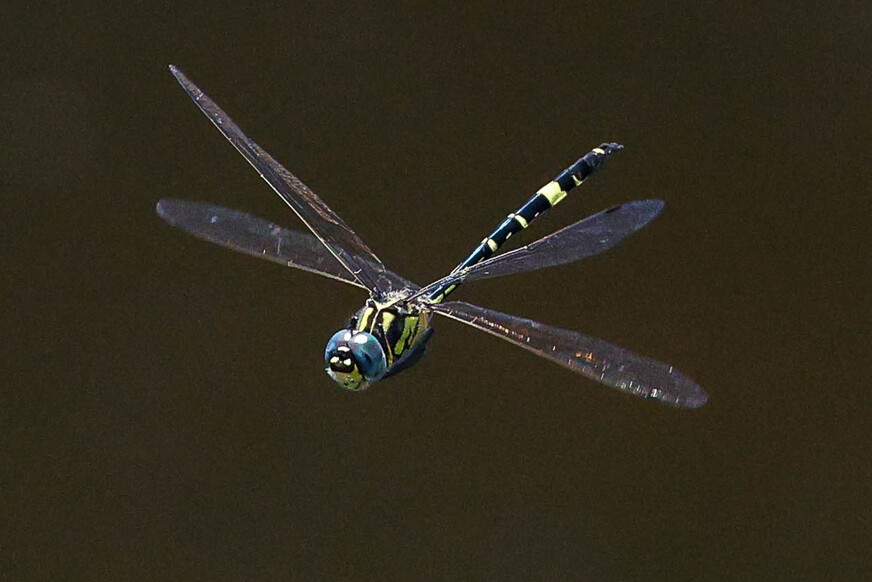

Conservation status
- Least Concern (IUCN 3.1)

Scientific classification
- Kingdom: Animalia
- Phylum: Arthropoda
- Clade: Pancrustacea
- Class: Insecta
- Order: Odonata
- Suborder: Anisoptera
- Superfamily: Libelluloidea
- Family: Corduliidae
- Genus: Hemicordulia
- Species: H. superba

Binomial name
- Hemicordulia superba Tillyard, 1911

= Hemicordulia superba =

Species of dragonfly

Hemicordulia superba is a species of dragonfly in the family Corduliidae, known as the superb emerald. It inhabits rivers, pools and lakes in south-eastern Queensland and northern New South Wales in Australia.

Hemicordulia superba is a small to medium-sized, black and yellow dragonfly with long legs. In both males and females the inboard edge of the hindwing is rounded.

== Etymology ==
The genus name Hemicordulia is derived from the Greek ἡμι- (hēmi, "half"), combined with Cordulia, a genus name derived from the Greek κορδύλη (kordylē, "club" or "cudgel"). The name refers to the close relationship of the genus to Cordulia.

The species name superba is derived from the Latin superbus ("splendid", "magnificent" or "superb"). The name refers to the species being regarded as the most distinct and beautiful member of the genus.

== Gallery ==
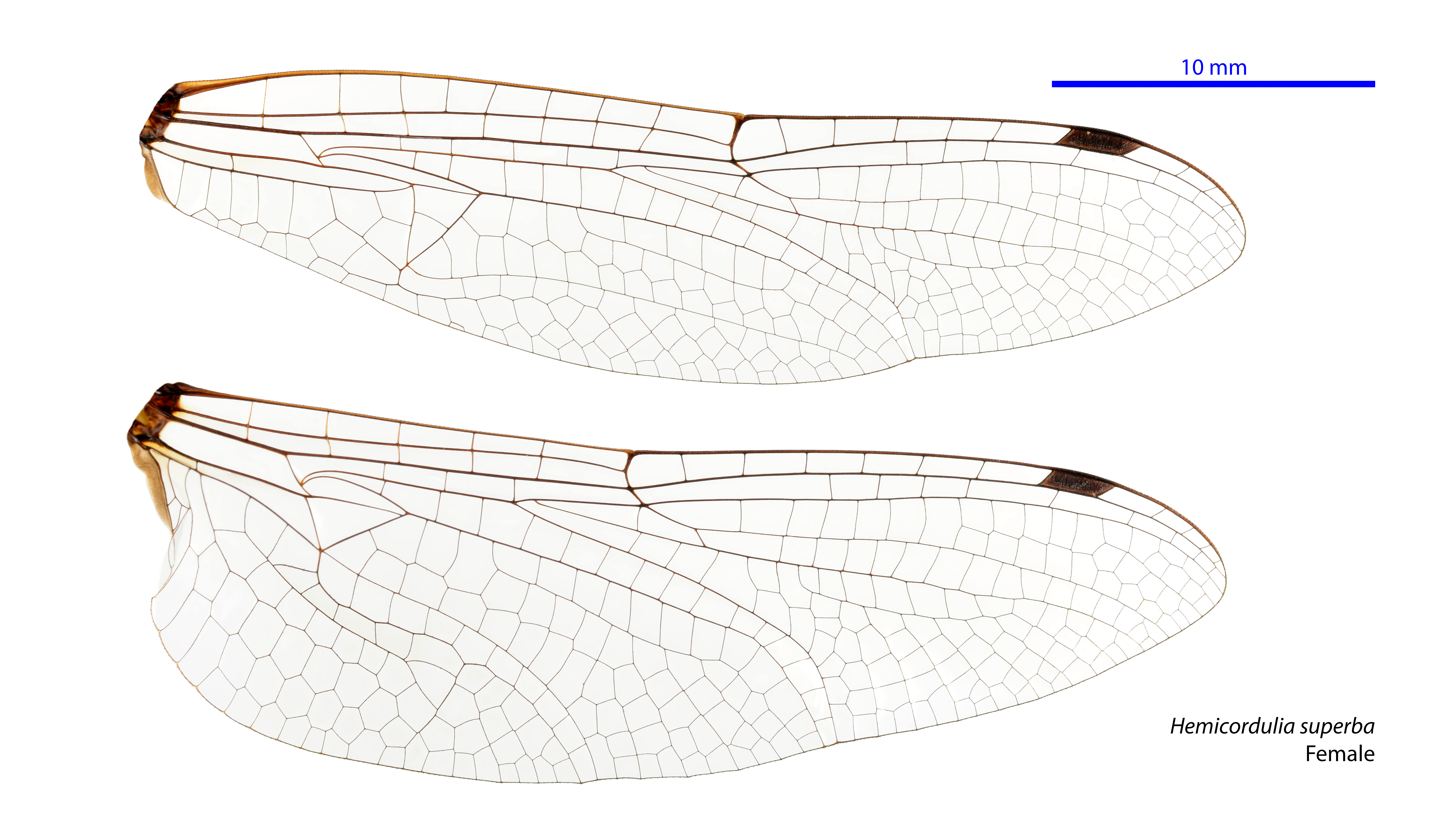
Female wings

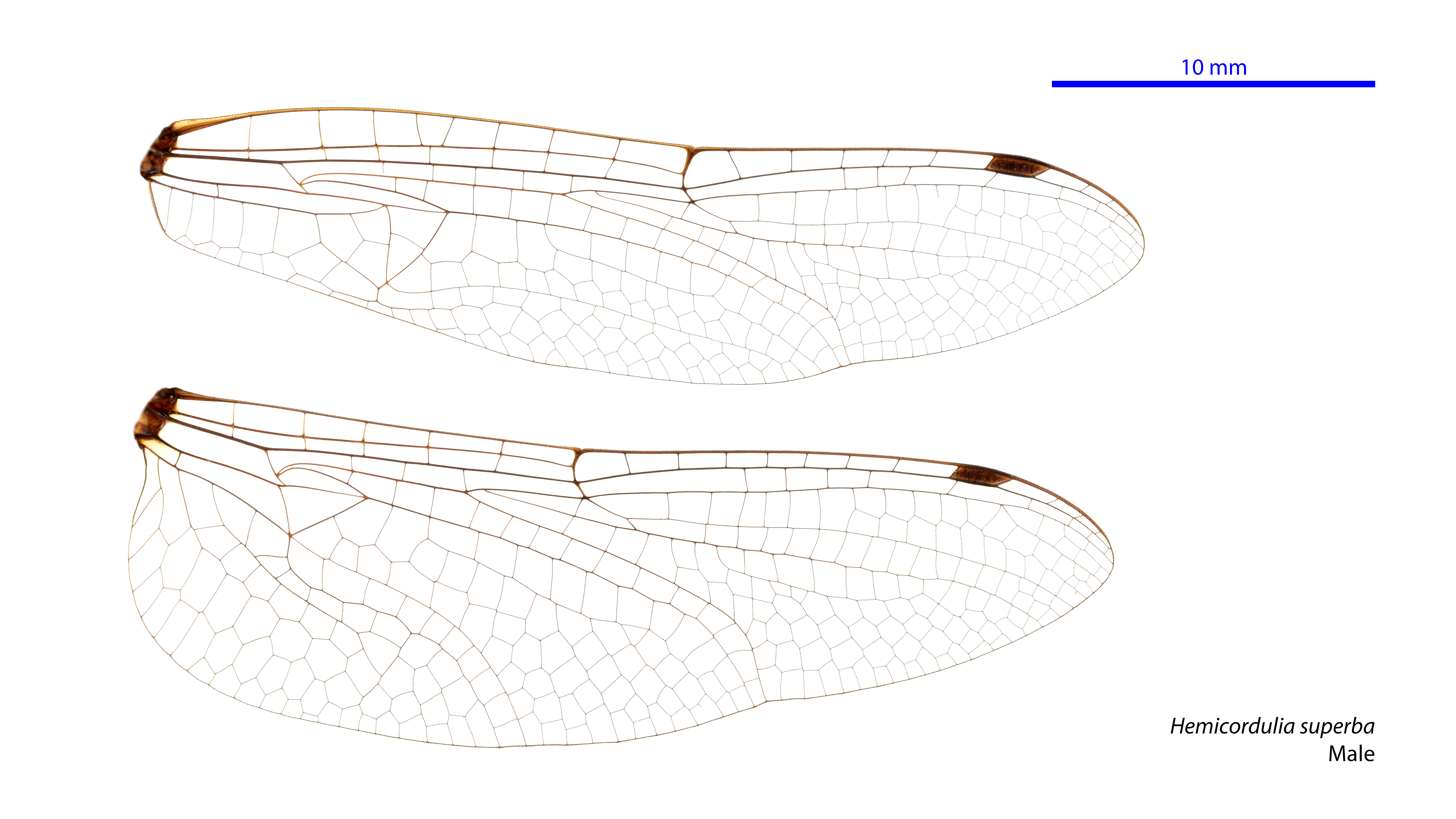
Male wings

== See also ==
- List of dragonflies of Australia
