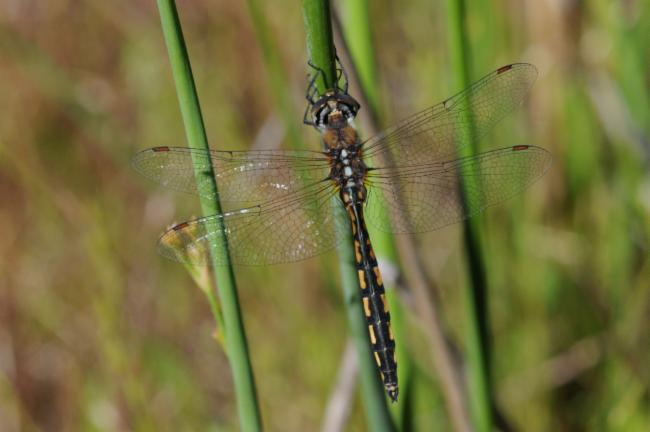

Conservation status
- Least Concern (IUCN 3.1)

Scientific classification
- Kingdom: Animalia
- Phylum: Arthropoda
- Clade: Pancrustacea
- Class: Insecta
- Order: Odonata
- Suborder: Anisoptera
- Superfamily: Libelluloidea
- Family: Corduliidae
- Genus: Hemicordulia
- Species: H. affinis

Binomial name
- Hemicordulia affinis (Selys, 1871)

Synonyms
- Cordulia affinis Selys, 1871; Procordulia affinis (Selys, 1871)

= Hemicordulia affinis =

Western swamp emerald

Species of dragonfly

Hemicordulia affinis, commonly known as the western swamp emerald, is a species of dragonfly in the family Corduliidae. It inhabits rivers, pools and lakes in south-western Australia.

Hemicordulia affinis is a small to medium-sized black and orange-yellow dragonfly with a thick, flattened tail.

== Taxonomy ==
Until 2025, Hemicordulia affinis was placed in the genus Procordulia. The IUCN Red List assessment for the species was published under this former name. Following research published in 2025, all species of Procordulia were transferred to Hemicordulia.

== Etymology ==
The genus name Hemicordulia is derived from the Greek ἡμι- (hēmi, "half"), combined with Cordulia, a genus name derived from the Greek κορδύλη (kordylē, "club" or "cudgel"). The name refers to the close relationship of the genus to Cordulia.

The species name affinis is Latin for "related to" or "closely allied", referring to its similarity to Cordulia jacksoniensis.

== Gallery ==
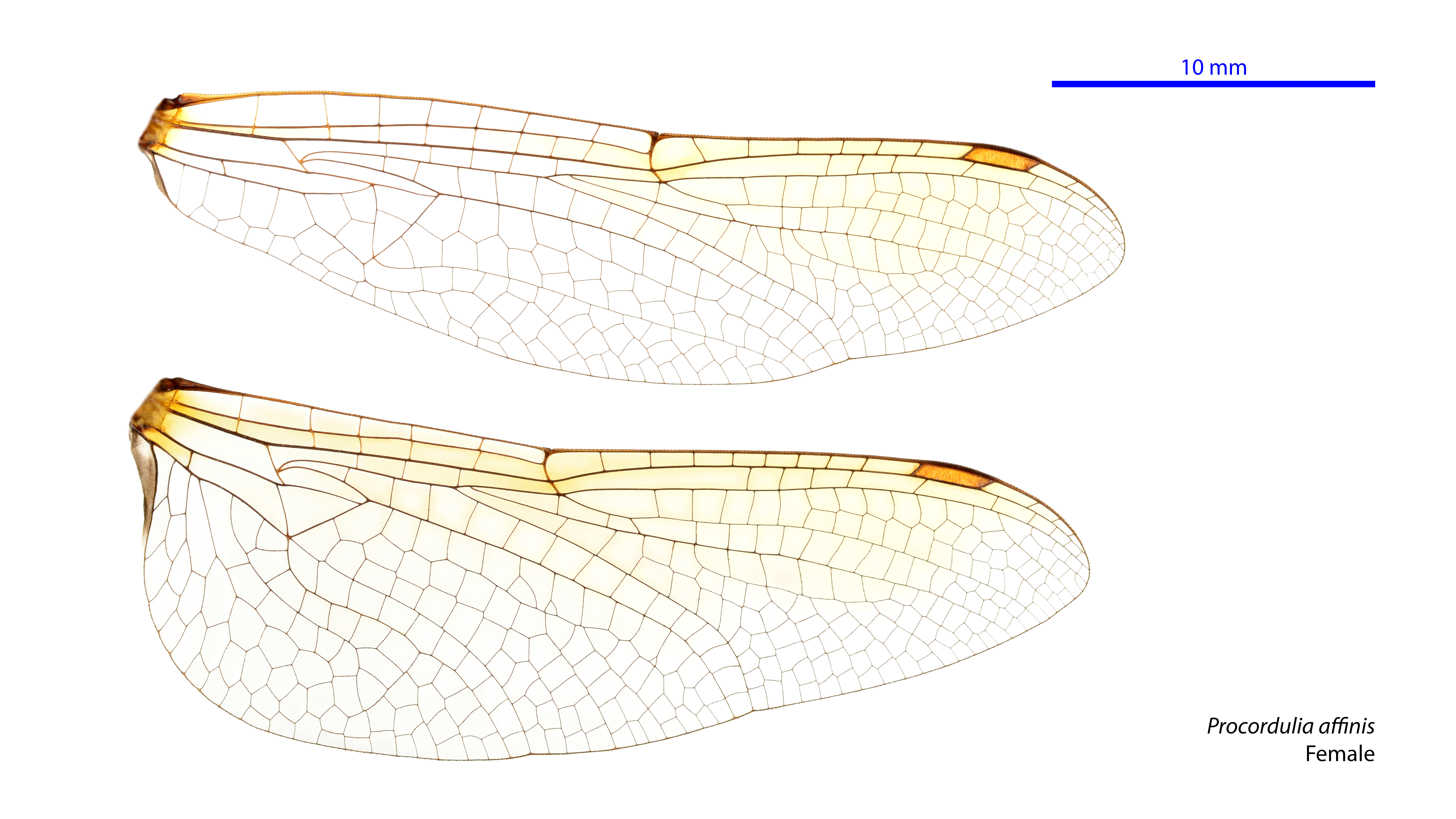
Female wings

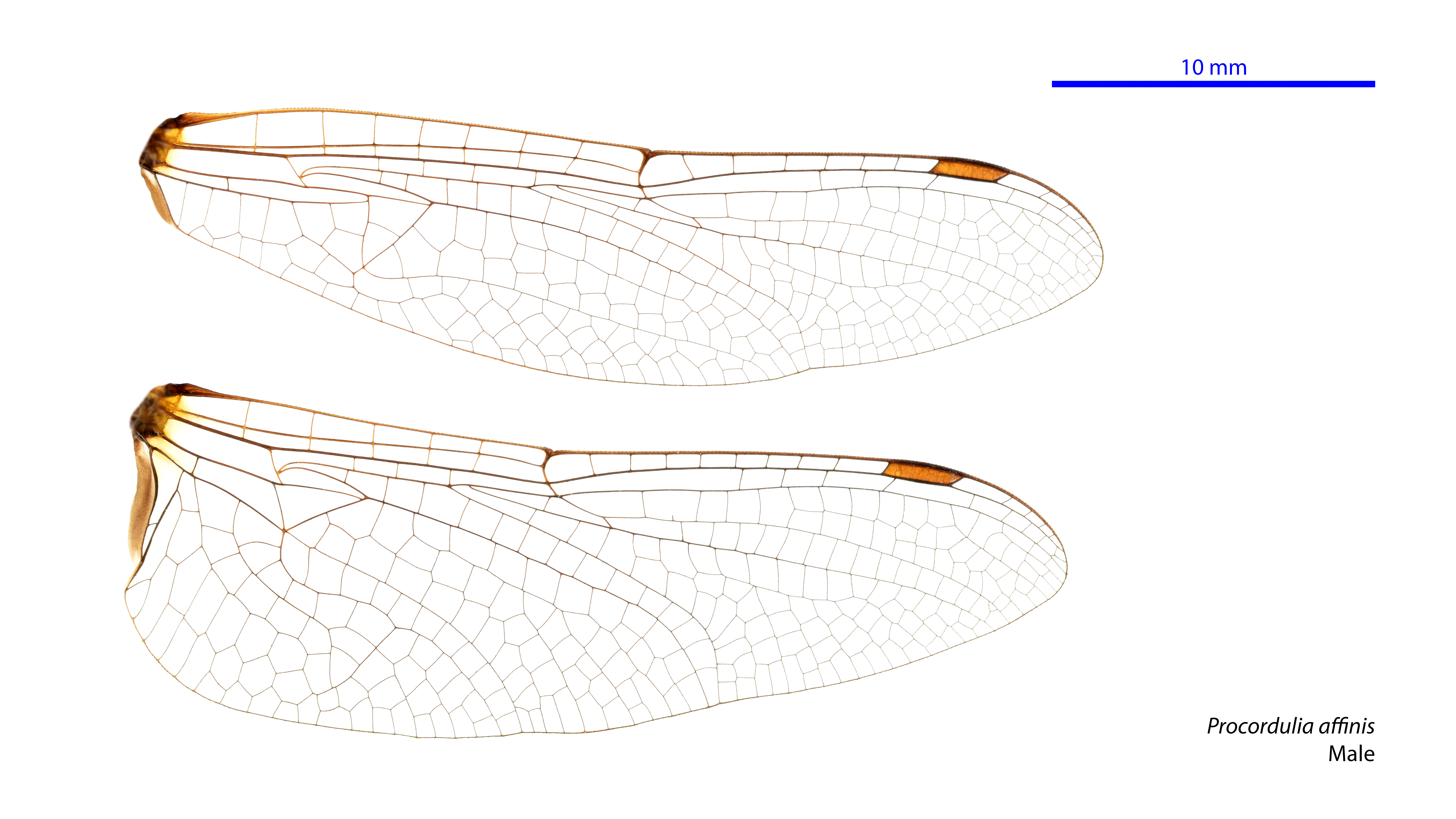
Male wings

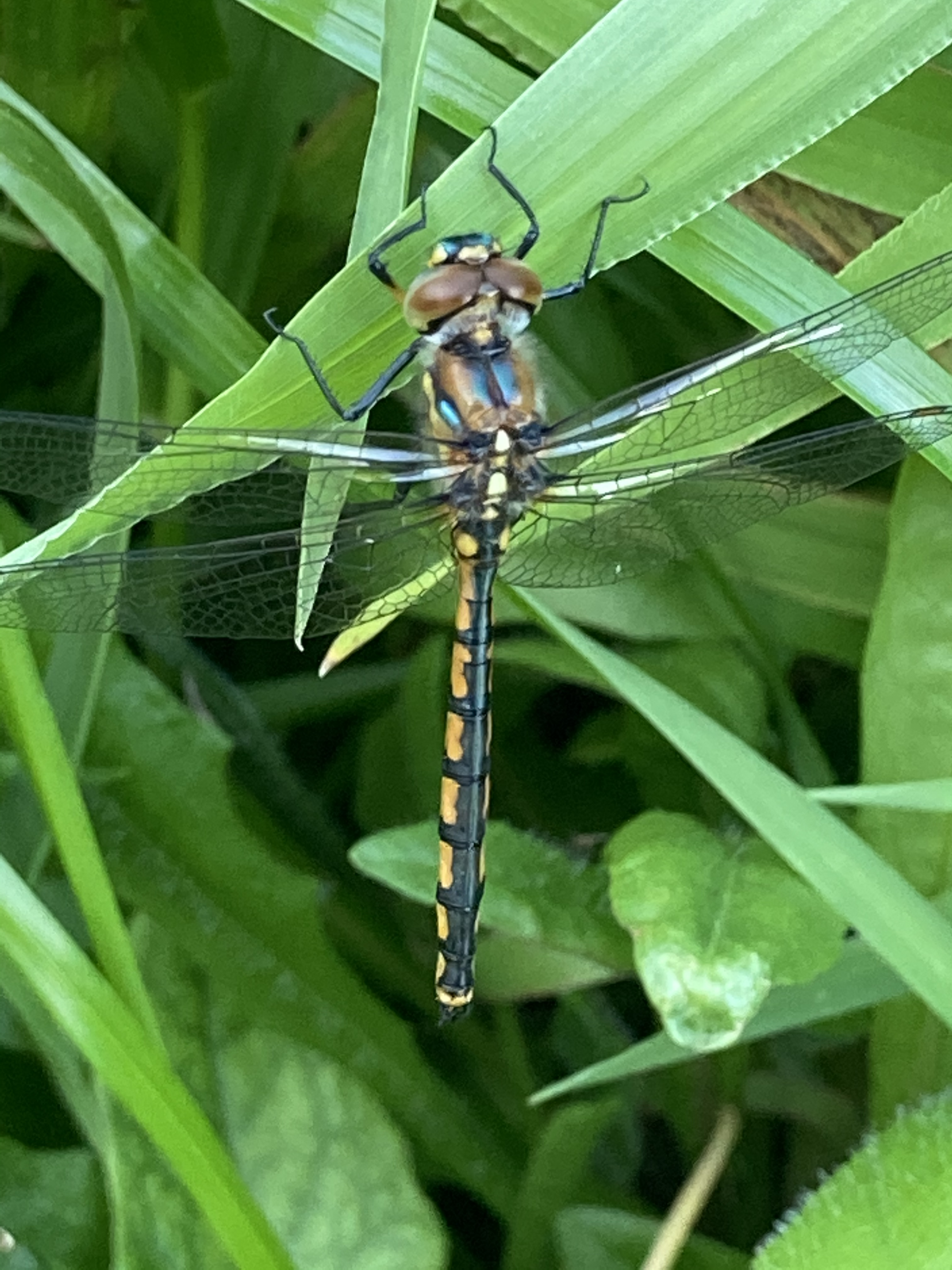
Western swamp emerald on grass blade

== See also ==
- List of dragonflies of Australia
