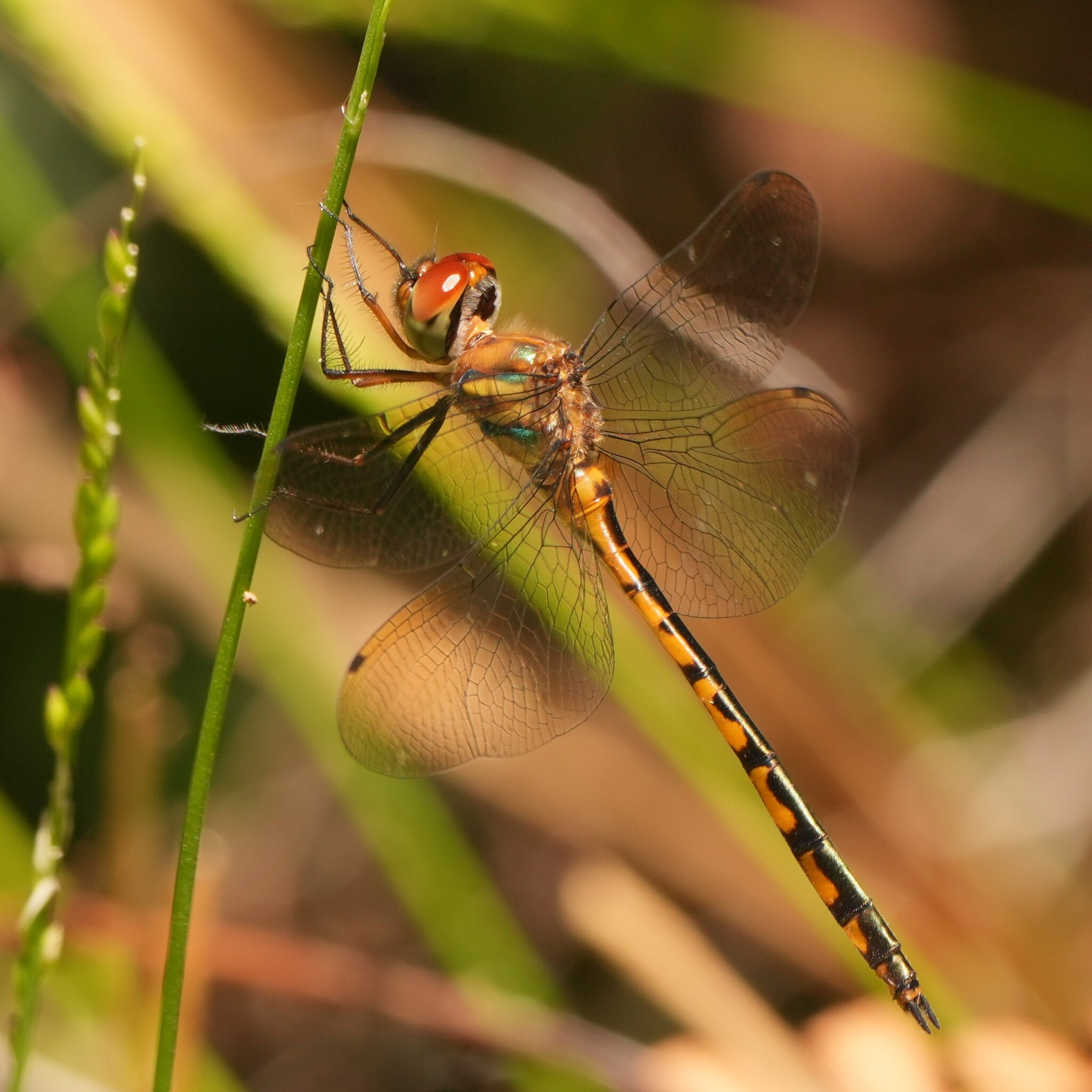

Conservation status
- Least Concern (IUCN 3.1)

Scientific classification
- Kingdom: Animalia
- Phylum: Arthropoda
- Clade: Pancrustacea
- Class: Insecta
- Order: Odonata
- Suborder: Anisoptera
- Superfamily: Libelluloidea
- Family: Corduliidae
- Genus: Hemicordulia
- Species: H. continentalis

Binomial name
- Hemicordulia continentalis Martin, 1907

= Hemicordulia continentalis =

Species of dragonfly

Hemicordulia continentalis is a species of dragonfly in the family Corduliidae, known as the fat-bellied emerald. It inhabits pools, lakes, ponds and swamps in coastal Queensland and northern New South Wales, Australia.

Hemicordulia continentalis is a small to medium-sized, black and yellow dragonfly with long legs. The male abdomen is swollen giving the appearance of a club. In both males and females the inboard edge of the hindwing is rounded.

== Etymology ==
The genus name Hemicordulia is derived from the Greek ἡμι- (hēmi, "half"), combined with Cordulia, a genus name derived from the Greek κορδύλη (kordylē, "club" or "cudgel"). The name refers to the close relationship of the genus to Cordulia.

The species name continentalis is the Latin word for "continuous", "uninterrupted", or "forming a connected whole". The name may refer to the species being regarded as intermediate between Hemicordulia assimilis and Hemicordulia novaehollandiae.

== Gallery ==
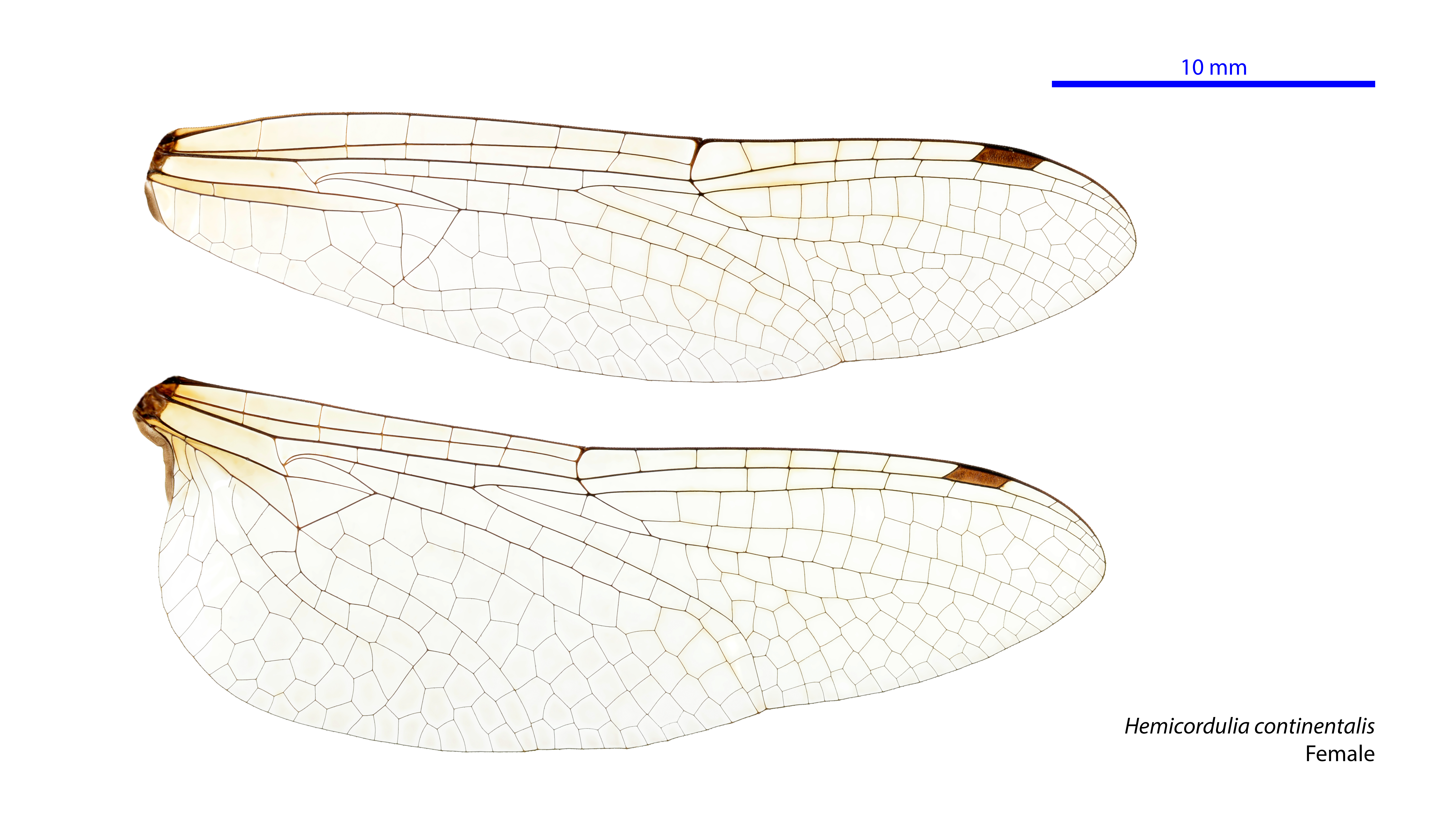
Female wings

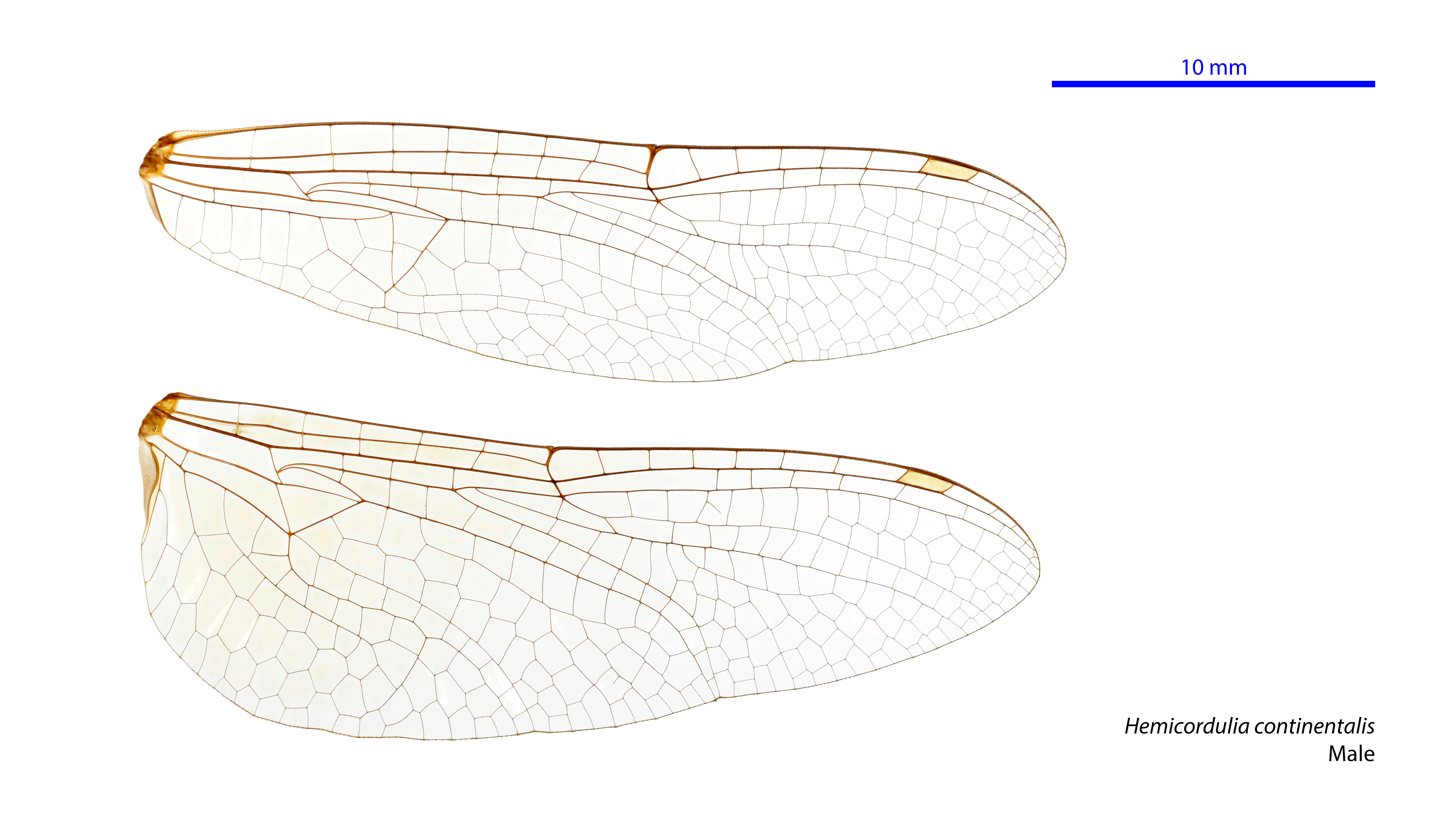
Male wings

== See also ==
- List of Odonata species of Australia
