= List of Odonata species of Australia =

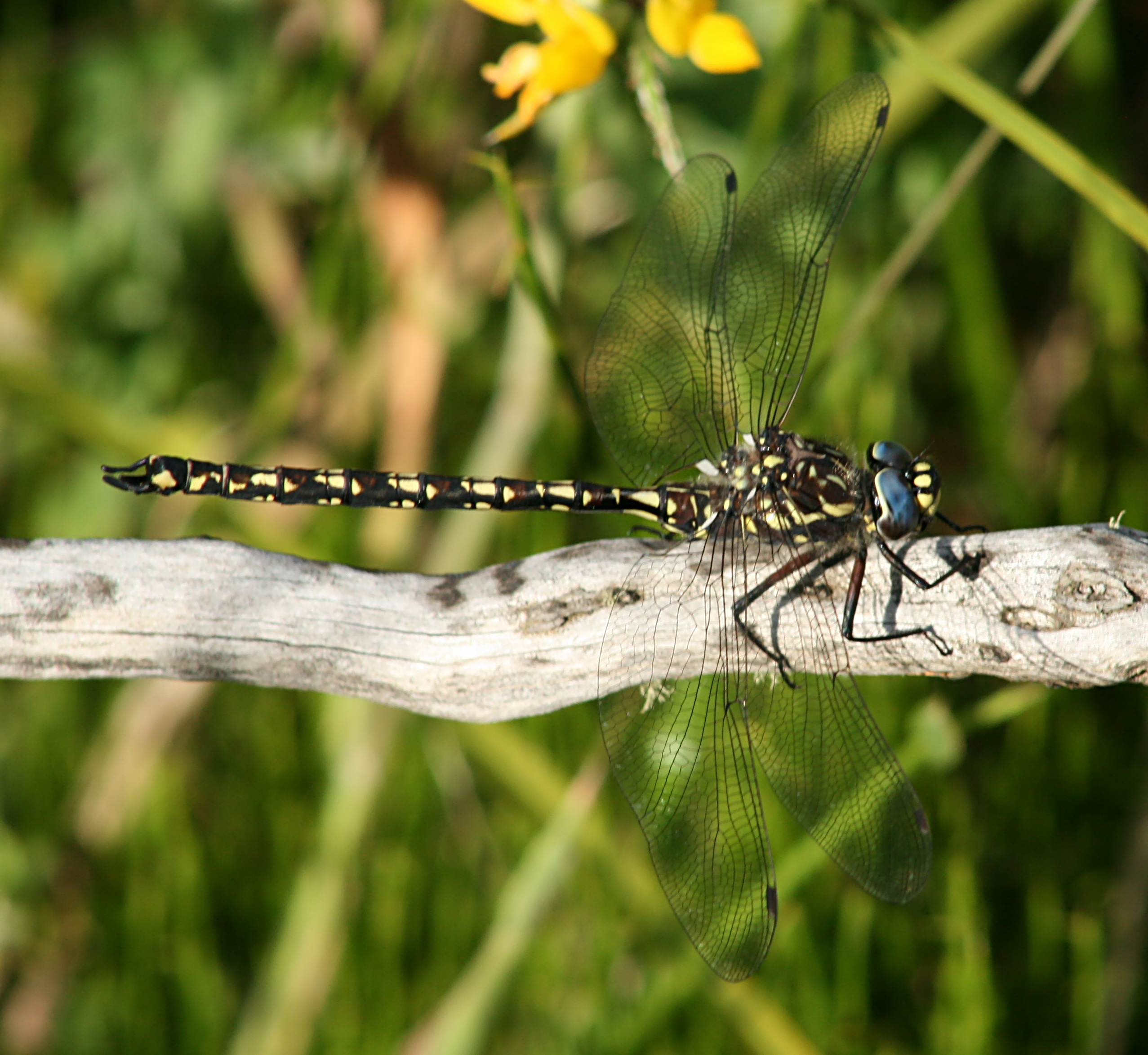
Alpine darner, Austroaeschna flavomaculata

This is a list of species of damselflies and dragonflies recorded in Australia.

Common names of species are linked, beside their scientific names.

The list is split into two groups: damselflies (suborder Zygoptera) and other dragonflies (suborder Anisoptera). Those groups are organized in Families and then Genera and Species.

== Zygoptera (damselflies) ==
=== Argiolestidae ===
genus: Archiargiolestes

- Midget flatwing, Archiargiolestes parvulus
- Tiny flatwing, Archiargiolestes pusillissimus
- Little flatwing, Archiargiolestes pusillus

genus: Austroargiolestes

- New England flatwing, Austroargiolestes alpinus
- Flame flatwing, Austroargiolestes amabilis
- Tropical flatwing, Austroargiolestes aureus
- Barrington flatwing, Austroargiolestes brookhousei
- Powdered flatwing, Austroargiolestes calcaris
- Milky flatwing, Austroargiolestes christine
- Golden flatwing, Austroargiolestes chrysoides
- Azure flatwing, Austroargiolestes elke
- Common flatwing, Austroargiolestes icteromelas
- Sydney flatwing, Austroargiolestes isabellae

genus: Griseargiolestes

- Coastal flatwing, Griseargiolestes albescens
- Turquoise flatwing, Griseargiolestes bucki
- Grey-chested flatwing, Griseargiolestes eboracus
- Springs flatwing, Griseargiolestes fontanus
- Grey flatwing, Griseargiolestes griseus
- Alpine flatwing, Griseargiolestes intermedius
- Metallic flatwing, Griseargiolestes metallicus

genus: Miniargiolestes

- Stream flatwing, Miniargiolestes minimus

genus: Podopteryx

- Treehole flatwing, Podopteryx selysi

=== Coenagrionidae ===
genus: Aciagrion

- Blue slim, Aciagrion fragile

genus: Agriocnemis

- Silver wisp, Agriocnemis argentea
- Tropical wisp, Agriocnemis dobsoni
- Pilbara wisp, Agriocnemis kunjina
- Pygmy wisp, Agriocnemis pygmaea
- Red-rumped wisp, Agriocnemis rubricauda
- Agriocnemis thoracalis

genus: Archibasis

- Blue-banded longtail, Archibasis mimetes

genus: Argiocnemis

- Red-tipped shadefly, Argiocnemis rubescens

genus: Austroagrion

- South-western billabongfly, Austroagrion cyane
- Northern billabongfly, Austroagrion exclamationis
- Pilbara billabongfly, Austroagrion pindrina
- Eastern billabongfly, Austroagrion watsoni

genus: Austrocnemis

- Tiny longlegs, Austrocnemis maccullochi
- Kimberley longlegs, Austrocnemis obscura
- Splendid longlegs, Austrocnemis splendida

genus: Austrocoenagrion

- Swamp bluet, Austrocoenagrion lyelli

genus: Caliagrion

- Large riverdamsel, Caliagrion billinghursti

genus: Ceriagrion

- Redtail, Ceriagrion aeruginosum

genus: Ischnura

- Aurora bluetail, Ischnura aurora
- Common bluetail, Ischnura heterosticta
- Colourful bluetail, Ischnura pruinescens

genus: Pseudagrion

- Gold-fronted riverdamsel, Pseudagrion aureofrons
- Northern riverdamsel, Pseudagrion cingillum
- Blue riverdamsel, Pseudagrion crenatum
- Flame-headed riverdamsel, Pseudagrion ignifer
- Dusky riverdamsel, Pseudagrion jedda
- Citrine-headed riverdamsel, Pseudagrion lucifer

genus: Teinobasis

- Red-breasted longtail, Teinobasis rufithorax

genus: Xanthagrion

- Red and blue damsel, Xanthagrion erythroneurum

=== Hemiphlebiidae ===
genus: Hemiphlebia

- Ancient greenling, Hemiphlebia mirabilis

=== Isostictidae ===
genus: Austrosticta

- Northern pondsitter, Austrosticta fieldi
- Eastern pondsitter, Austrosticta frater
- Kimberley pondsitter, Austrosticta soror

genus: Eurysticta

- Pilbara pin, Eurysticta coolawanyah
- Coomalie pin, Eurysticta coomalie
- Kimberley pin, Eurysticta kununurra
- Queensland pin, Eurysticta reevesi

genus: Labidiosticta

- Large wiretail, Labidiosticta vallisi

genus: Lithosticta

- Rock narrow-wing, Lithosticta macra

genus: Neosticta

- Southern pinfly, Neosticta canescens
- Tropical pinfly, Neosticta fraseri
- Forest pinfly, Neosticta silvarum

genus: Oristicta

- Slender wiretail, Oristicta filicicola
- Elegant wiretail, Oristicta rosendaleorum

genus: Rhadinosticta

- Northern wiretail, Rhadinosticta banksi
- Powdered wiretail, Rhadinosticta simplex

=== Lestidae ===
genus: Austrolestes

- Western ringtail, Austrolestes aleison
- Slender ringtail, Austrolestes analis
- Blue ringtail, Austrolestes annulosus
- Inland ringtail, Austrolestes aridus
- Metallic ringtail, Austrolestes cingulatus
- Iota ringtail, Austrolestes io
- Wandering ringtail, Austrolestes leda
- Dune ringtail, Austrolestes minjerriba
- Cup ringtail, Austrolestes psyche

genus: Indolestes

- Small reedling, Indolestes alleni
- Cave reedling, Indolestes obiri
- Slender reedling, Indolestes tenuissimus
- Northern ringtail, Indolestes insularis

genus: Lestes

- Dusky spreadwing, Lestes concinnus

=== Lestoideidae ===
genus: Diphlebia

- Sapphire rockmaster, Diphlebia coerulescens
- Tropical rockmaster, Diphlebia euphoeoides
- Giant rockmaster, Diphlebia hybridoides
- Whitewater rockmaster, Diphlebia lestoides
- Arrowhead rockmaster, Diphlebia nymphoides

genus: Lestoidea

- Large bluestreak, Lestoidea barbarae
- Short-tipped bluestreak, Lestoidea brevicauda
- Common bluestreak, Lestoidea conjuncta
- Mount Lewis bluestreak, Lestoidea lewisiana

=== Platycnemididae ===
genus: Nososticta

- Black-winged threadtail, Nososticta baroalba
- Green-blue threadtail, Nososticta coelestina
- Northern threadtail, Nososticta fraterna
- Spot-winged threadtail, Nososticta kalumburu
- Koolpinyah threadtail, Nososticta koolpinyah
- Citrine threadtail, Nososticta koongarra
- Malachite threadtail, Nososticta liveringa
- Striped threadtail, Nososticta mouldsi
- Pilbara threadtail, Nososticta pilbara
- Orange threadtail, Nososticta solida
- Fivespot threadtail, Nososticta solitaria
- Melville Island threadtail, Nososticta taracumbi

=== Synlestidae ===
genus: Chorismagrion

- Pretty relict, Chorismagrion risi

genus: Episynlestes

- Southern whitetip, Episynlestes albicaudus
- Tropical whitetip, Episynlestes cristatus
- Intermediate whitetip, Episynlestes intermedius

genus: Synlestes

- Forest needle, Synlestes selysi
- Tropical needle, Synlestes tropicus
- Bronze needle, Synlestes weyersii

== Anisoptera (dragonflies) ==
=== Aeshnidae ===
genus: Acanthaeschna

- Thylacine darner, Acanthaeschna victoria (Coastal southern Queensland and northern New South Wales)

genus: Adversaeschna

- Blue-spotted hawker, Adversaeschna brevistyla (Coastal areas from Cooktown in northern Queensland, south to Victoria, and the Pilbara in Western Australia)

genus: Agyrtacantha

- Trifid duskhawker, Agyrtacantha dirupta (Cape York Peninsula)

genus: Anaciaeschna

- Australasian duskhawker, Anaciaeschna jaspidea (Coastal Queensland and Northern Territory)

genus: Anax

- Kimberley emperor, Anax georgius (The Kimberley)
- Green emperor, Anax gibbosulus (Coastal northern Australia from the Kimberley to the Gold Coast)
- Lesser green emperor, Anax guttatus (Coastal northern Australia from the Kimberley to the Gold Coast)
- Australian emperor, Anax papuensis (All Australia and islands)

genus: Antipodophlebia

- Terrestrial evening darner, Antipodophlebia asthenes

genus: Austroaeschna

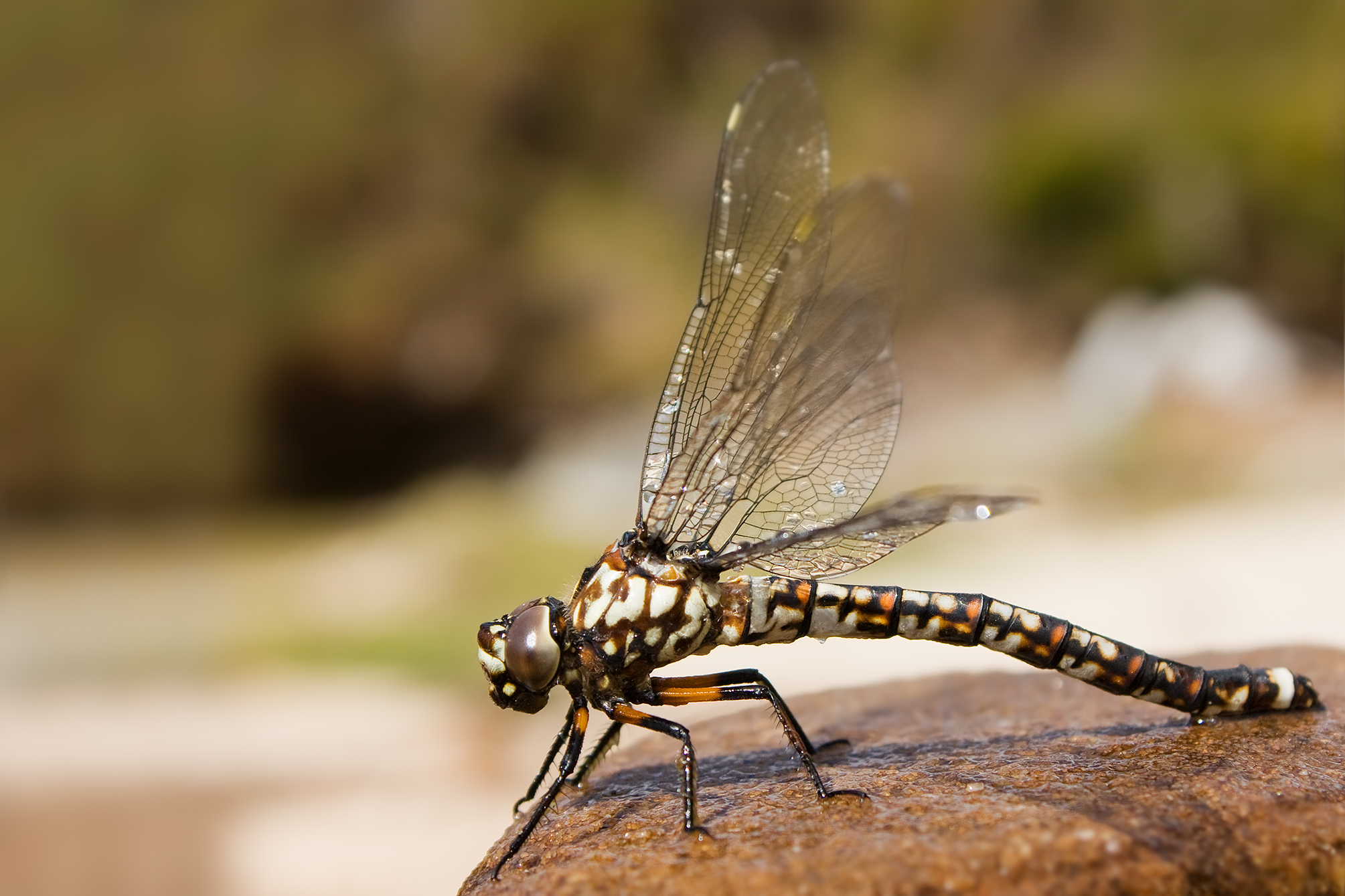
Lesser Tasmanian darner Austroaeschna hardyi

- Western darner, Austroaeschna anacantha (Coastal south-western Western Australia)
- Mountain darner, Austroaeschna atrata (Australian Alps)
- S-spot darner, Austroaeschna christine (Central coast of Queensland)
- Wallum darner, Austroaeschna cooloola Southern coast of Queensland
- Eungella darner, Austroaeschna eungella (Central coast of Queensland)
- Alpine darner, Austroaeschna flavomaculata (Australian Alps)
- Lesser Tasmanian darner, Austroaeschna hardyi (Tasmania)
- Whitewater darner, Austroaeschna inermis (Coastal south-eastern Australia)
- Grampians darner, Austroaeschna ingrid (Western Victoria)
- Carnarvon darner, Austroaeschna muelleri (Inland southern Queensland)
- Multi-spotted darner, Austroaeschna multipunctata (Southern coastal New South Wales to Victoria)
- Sydney mountain darner, Austroaeschna obscura (Mountains around Sydney)
- Swamp darner, Austroaeschna parvistigma (Coastal New South Wales, Victoria, southern South Australia and Tasmania)
- Inland darner, Austroaeschna pinheyi (Carnarvon Gorge, Queensland)
- Forest darner, Austroaeschna pulchra (Coastal southern Queensland, New South Wales and Victoria)
- Sigma darner, Austroaeschna sigma (Coastal southern Queensland and New South Wales)
- Tropical unicorn darner, Austroaeschna speciosa (Central coast of Queensland)
- Conehead darner, Austroaeschna subapicalis (Coastal New South Wales and Victoria)
- Tasmanian darner, Austroaeschna tasmanica (Tasmania)
- Unicorn darner, Austroaeschna unicornis (Southern Queensland to coastal New South Wales, Victoria, Tasmania and South Australia)

genus: Austrogynacantha

- Australian duskhawker, Austrogynacantha heterogena (Across Australia north of about Sydney)

genus: Austrophlebia

- Southern giant darner, Austrophlebia costalis
- Northern giant darner, Austrophlebia subcostalis

genus: Dendroaeschna

- Wide-faced darner, Dendroaeschna conspersa

genus: Dromaeschna

- Green-striped darner, Dromaeschna forcipata (Coast of Cape York Peninsula, Queensland)
- Ochre-tipped darner, Dromaeschna weiskei (Coast of Cape York Peninsula, Queensland)

genus: Gynacantha

- Lesser duskhawker, Gynacantha dobsoni (Northern Australia)
- Slender duskhawker, Gynacantha kirbyi (Northern Queensland)
- Paddle-tipped duskhawker, Gynacantha mocsaryi (Northern Queensland)
- Cave duskhawker, Gynacantha nourlangie (Inland and northern Australia)
- Grey duskhawker, Gynacantha rosenbergi (Northern Queensland)

genus: Notoaeschna

- Northern riffle darner, Notoaeschna geminata
- Southern riffle darner, Notoaeschna sagittata

genus: Spinaeschna

- Southern cascade darner, Spinaeschna tripunctata
- Tropical cascade darner, Spinaeschna watsoni

genus: Telephlebia

- Southern evening darner, Telephlebia brevicauda
- Northern evening darner, Telephlebia cyclops
- Eastern evening darner, Telephlebia godeffroyi
- Tropical evening darner, Telephlebia tillyardi
- Coastal evening darner, Telephlebia tryoni
- Carnarvon evening darner, Telephlebia undia

=== Aeschnosomatidae ===
genus: Pentathemis

- Metallic tigerhawk, Pentathemis membranulata (Northern Australia)

=== Austrocorduliidae ===
genus: Apocordulia

- Nighthawk, Apocordulia macrops

genus: Austrocordulia

- Sydney hawk, Austrocordulia leonardi
- Eastern hawk, Austrocordulia refracta
- Top End hawk, Austrocordulia territoria

genus: Austrophya

- Summit mystic, Austrophya monteithorum
- Rainforest mystic, Austrophya mystica

genus: Cordulephya

- Common shutwing, Cordulephya pygmaea
- Tropical shutwing, Cordulephya bidens
- Clubbed shutwing, Cordulephya divergens
- Mountain shutwing, Cordulephya montana

genus: Hesperocordulia

- Orange streamcruiser, Hesperocordulia berthoudi

genus: Lathrocordulia

- Queensland swiftwing, Lathrocordulia garrisoni
- Western swiftwing, Lathrocordulia metallica

genus: Micromidia

- Forest mosquitohawk, Micromidia atrifrons
- Early mosquitohawk, Micromidia convergens
- Thursday Island mosquitohawk, Micromidia rodericki

=== Austropetaliidae ===
genus: Archipetalia

- Tasmanian redspot, Archipetalia auriculata (Tasmania)

genus: Austropetalia

- Northern redspot, Austropetalia annaliese (Eastern New South Wales)
- Waterfall redspot, Austropetalia patricia (Coastal New South Wales)
- Alpine redspot, Austropetalia tonyana (Southern New South Wales and Victoria between 600–1800 metres elevation)

=== Corduliidae ===
genus: Hemicordulia

- Western swamp emerald, Hemicordulia affinis (South-western Western Australia)
- Australian emerald, Hemicordulia australiae (Widespread in eastern and south-western Australia)
- Fat-bellied emerald, Hemicordulia continentalis (Coastal Queensland)
- Desert emerald, Hemicordulia flava (Central Australia)
- Yellow-spotted emerald, Hemicordulia intermedia (Northern Australia)
- Eastern swamp emerald, Hemicordulia jacksoniensis (Eastern New South Wales, Victoria, south-eastern South Australia, Tasmania)
- Slender emerald, Hemicordulia kalliste (Northern Australia)
- Pilbara emerald, Hemicordulia koomina (Pilbara, Western Australia)
- Superb emerald, Hemicordulia superba (Northern New South Wales and south-eastern Queensland)
- Tau emerald, Hemicordulia tau (Widespread across Australia)

genus: Metaphya

- Offshore emerald, Metaphya tillyardi (Cape York)

genus: Procordulia (now incorporated into the genus Hemicordulia)

=== Gomphidae ===
genus: Antipodogomphus

- Southern dragon, Antipodogomphus acolythus Queensland except for Cape York and south-west, New South Wales except south-east and Victoria
- Top End dragon, Antipodogomphus dentosus Top End of Northern Territory
- Cape York dragon, Antipodogomphus edentulus Cape York, Queensland
- Pilbara dragon, Antipodogomphus hodgkini Pilbara region of Western Australia
- Northern dragon, Antipodogomphus neophytus Northern Australia, from Western Australia to Queensland
- Spinehead dragon, Antipodogomphus proselythus Coastal Queensland

genus: Armagomphus

- Armourtail, Armagomphus armiger South-western Western Australia.

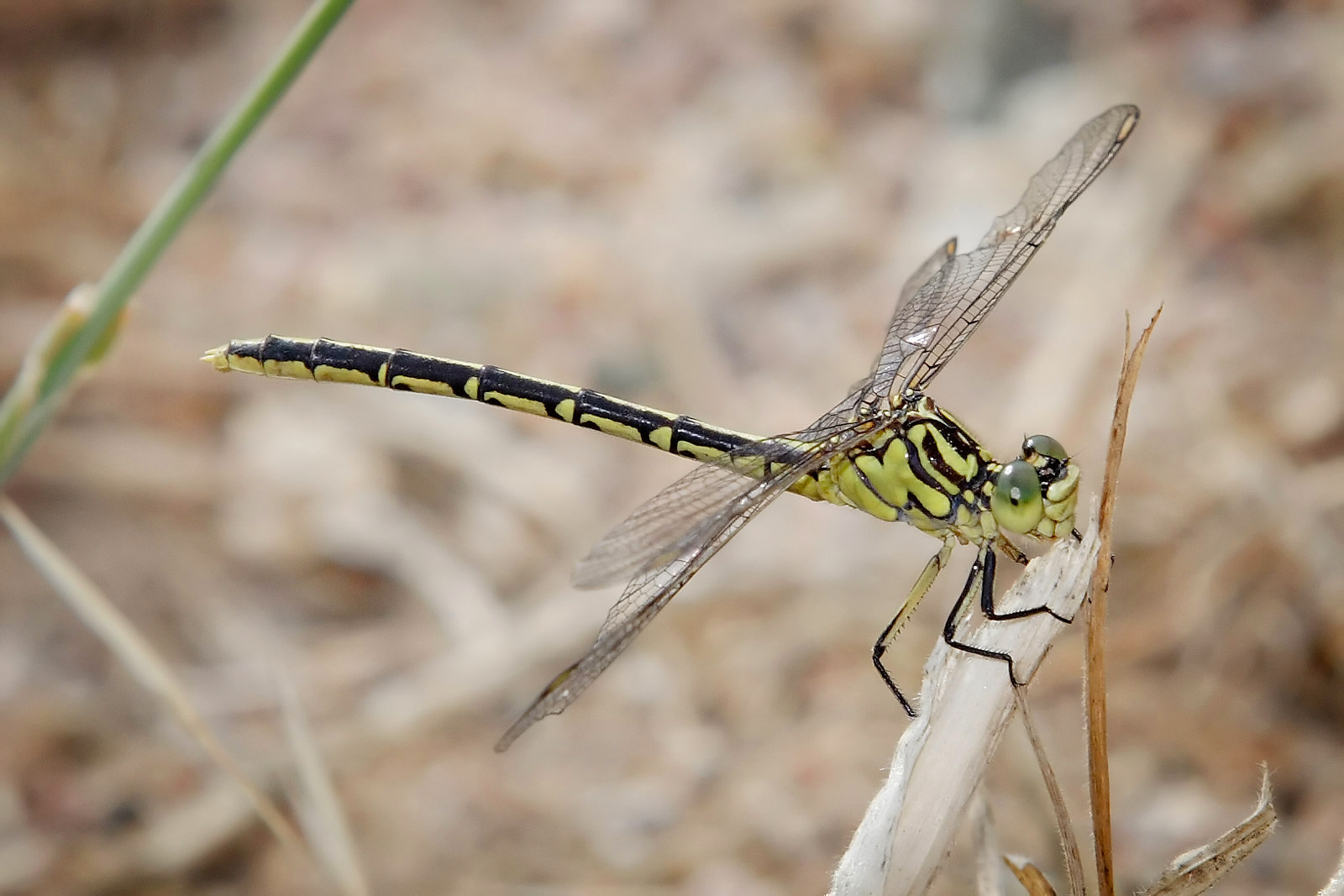
Austrogomphus guerini

genus: Austroepigomphus

subgenus Austroepigomphus
- Twinspot hunter, Austroepigomphus praeruptus (South-eastern South Australia, Victoria)

subgenus Xerogomphus
- Western red hunter, Austroepigomphus gordoni (Western Australia except the Kimberleys and central Australia)
- Flame-tipped hunter, Austroepigomphus turneri (Northern Australia, from Western Australia to Queensland)

genus: Austrogomphus

subgenus Austrogomphus
- Murray River hunter, Austrogomphus angelorum (South-eastern South Australia, Victoria, western New South Wales)
- Toothed hunter, Austrogomphus arbustorum (Northern Queensland)
- Inland hunter, Austrogomphus australis (Victoria, south-eastern South Australia, southern Queensland, north-eastern and western New South Wales)
- Western inland hunter, Austrogomphus collaris (South-western Western Australia)
- Unicorn hunter, Austrogomphus cornutus (Victoria, eastern New South Wales, mid- and southern Queensland)
- Northern river hunter, Austrogomphus doddi (North-eastern Queensland)
- Yellow-striped hunter, Austrogomphus guerini (South-eastern Queensland, eastern New South Wales, Victoria, south-eastern South Australia, Tasmania)
- Pimple-headed hunter, Austrogomphus mjobergi (Northern Northern Territory, north-western Western Australia, north-eastern Queensland)
- Kimberly hunter, Austrogomphus mouldsorum (North-western Western Australia)
- Jade hunter, Austrogomphus ochraceus (South-eastern Queensland, eastern New South Wales, southern Victoria)
- Tiny hunter, Austrogomphus pusillus (North-western Western Australia)

subgenus Pleiogomphus
- Pale hunter, Austrogomphus amphiclitus (Eastern New South Wales, eastern and south-western Queensland)
- Dark hunter, Austrogomphus bifurcatus (North-eastern Queensland)
- Fork hunter, Austrogomphus divaricatus (Eastern Queensland)
- Lemon-tipped hunter, Austrogomphus prasinus (North-eastern Queensland)

genus: Hemigomphus

- Black vicetail, Hemigomphus atratus Mid coastal Queensland
- Zebra vicetail, Hemigomphus comitatus Mid and north coastal Queensland
- Wallum vicetail, Hemigomphus cooloola Coastal New South Wales
- Southern vicetail, Hemigomphus gouldii Coastal South Australia, Victoria, New South Wales, southern Queensland
- Stout vicetail, Hemigomphus heteroclytus Coastal South Australia, Victoria, New South Wales, southern Queensland
- Kakadu vicetail, Hemigomphus magela Northern Territory
- Rainforest vicetail, Hemigomphus theischingeri Mid and northern coastal Queensland

genus: Ictinogomphus

- Australian tiger, Ictinogomphus australis
- Pilbara tiger, Ictinogomphus dobsoni
- Cape York tiger, Ictinogomphus paulini

genus: Odontogomphus

- Pinchtail, Odontogomphus donnellyi (Northern coastal Queensland)

genus: Zephyrogomphus

- Lilac hunter, Zephyrogomphus lateralis (South-western Western Australia)
- Rainforest hunter, Zephyrogomphus longipositor (North-eastern Queensland)

=== Gomphomacromiidae ===
genus: Archaeophya

- Horned urfly, Archaeophya adamsi
- Magnificent urfly, Archaeophya magnifica

=== Libellulidae ===
genus: Aethriamanta

- Square-spot basker, Aethriamanta circumsignata (Northern Australia)
- L-spot basker, Aethriamanta nymphaeae (Northern Australia)

genus: Agrionoptera

- Red swampdragon, Agrionoptera insignis allogenes (Northern New South Wales, eastern Queensland, Northern Territory)
- Striped swampdragon, Agrionoptera longitudinalis biserialis (North-eastern Queensland)

genus: Austrothemis

- Swamp flat-tail, Austrothemis nigrescens (Southern Australia)

genus: Brachydiplax

- Palemouth, Brachydiplax denticauda
- Darkmouth, Brachydiplax duivenbodei

genus: Camacinia

- Black knight, Camacinia othello

genus: Crocothemis

- Black-headed skimmer, Crocothemis nigrifrons

genus: Diplacodes

- Wandering percher, Diplacodes bipunctata (Widespread across Australia)
- Scarlet percher, Diplacodes haematodes (Widespread across Australia)
- Black-faced percher, Diplacodes melanopsis (Coastal southern Queensland, coastal New South Wales, Victoria)
- Charcoal-winged percher, Diplacodes nebulosa (Northern Australia)
- Chalky percher, Diplacodes trivialis (Northern Australia)

genus: Huonia

- Forestwatcher, Huonia melvillensis

genus: Hydrobasileus

- Water prince, Hydrobasileus brevistylus

genus: Lathrecista

- Australasian slimwing, Lathrecista asiatica festa

genus: Macrodiplax

- Wandering pennant, Macrodiplax cora

genus: Nannodiplax

- Pygmy percher, Nannodiplax rubra

genus: Nannophlebia

- Elusive archtail, Nannophlebia eludens
- Pilbara archtail, Nannophlebia injibandi
- Top End archtail, Nannophlebia mudginberri
- Common archtail, Nannophlebia risi

genus: Nannophya

- Australian pygmyfly, Nannophya australis
- Eastern pygmyfly, Nannophya dalei
- Artesian pygmyfly, Nannophya fenshami
- Western pygmyfly, Nannophya occidentalis
- Scarlet pygmyfly, Nannophya paulsoni

genus: Neurothemis

- Spotted grasshawk, Neurothemis oligoneura
- Painted grasshawk, Neurothemis stigmatizans

genus: Notolibellula

- Bicoloured skimmer, Notolibellula bicolor

genus: Orthetrum

- Speckled skimmer, Orthetrum balteatum
- Brownwater skimmer, Orthetrum boumiera
- Blue skimmer, Orthetrum caledonicum
- Rosy skimmer, Orthetrum migratum
- Slender skimmer, Orthetrum sabina
- Green skimmer, Orthetrum serapia
- Fiery skimmer, Orthetrum villosovittatum

genus: Pantala

- Wandering glider, Pantala flavescens

genus: Potamarcha

- Swampwatcher, Potamarcha congener

genus: Raphismia

- Spiny-chested percher, Raphismia bispina

genus: Rhodothemis

- Red arrow, Rhodothemis lieftincki

genus: Rhyothemis

- Iridescent flutterer, Rhyothemis braganza
- Graphic flutterer, Rhyothemis graphiptera
- Sapphire flutterer, Rhyothemis princeps
- Jewel flutterer, Rhyothemis resplendens
- Yellow-striped flutterer, Rhyothemis variegata

genus: Tetrathemis

- Rainforest elf, Tetrathemis irregularis

genus: Tholymis

- Twister, Tholymis tillarga

genus: Tramea

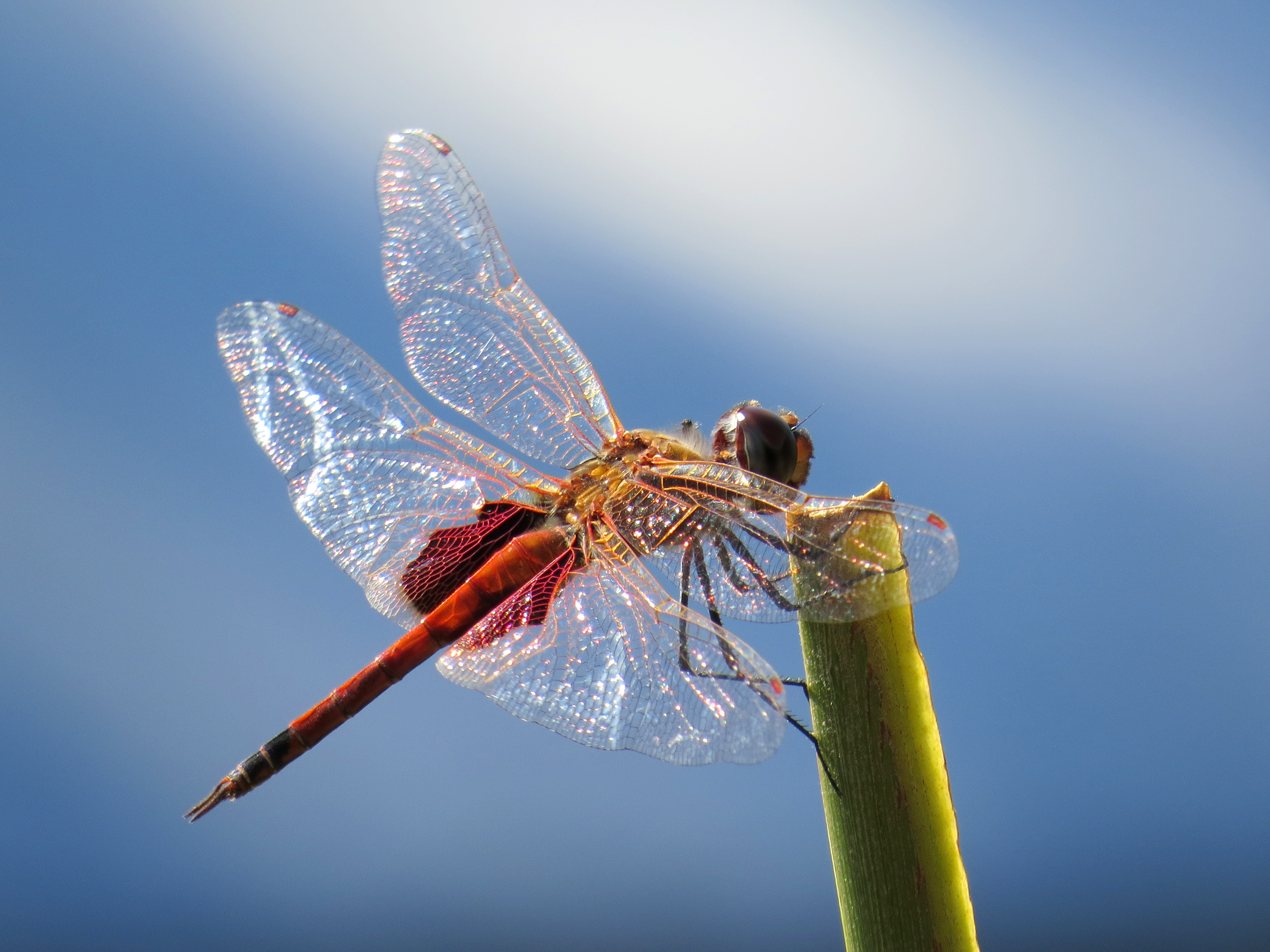
Male common glider - Darwin

- Dune glider, Tramea eurybia
- Common glider, Tramea loewii
- Northern glider, Tramea transmarina
- Narrow-lobed glider, Tramea stenoloba

genus: Urothemis

- Red baron, Urothemis aliena

genus: Zyxomma

- Short-tailed duskdarter, Zyxomma elgneri
- Large duskdarter, Zyxomma multinervorum
- Long-tailed duskdarter, Zyxomma petiolatum

=== Macromiidae ===
genus: Macromia

- Australian cruiser, Macromia tillyardi
- Rainforest cruiser, Macromia viridescens

=== Petaluridae ===
genus: Petalura

- South-eastern petaltail, Petalura gigantea
- Western petaltail, Petalura hesperia
- Giant petaltail, Petalura ingentissima
- Coastal petaltail, Petalura litorea
- Beautiful petaltail, Petalura pulcherrima

=== Pseudocorduliidae ===
genus: Pseudocordulia

- Circle-tipped mistfly, Pseudocordulia circularis
- Ellipse-tipped mistfly, Pseudocordulia elliptica

=== Synthemistidae ===
genus: Archaeosynthemis

- Twinspot tigertail, Archaeosynthemis leachii
- Western brown tigertail, Archaeosynthemis occidentalis
- Eastern brown tigertail, Archaeosynthemis orientalis
- Spiny tigertail, Archaeosynthemis spiniger

genus: Austrosynthemis

- Turquoise tigertail, Austrosynthemis cyanitincta

genus: Choristhemis

- Yellow-tipped tigertail, Choristhemis flavoterminata
- Delicate tigertail, Choristhemis olivei

genus: Eusynthemis

- Variable tigertail, Eusynthemis aurolineata
- Mount Lewis tigertail, Eusynthemis barbarae
- Small tigertail, Eusynthemis brevistyla
- Cooloola tigertail, Eusynthemis cooloola
- Carnarvon tigertail, Eusynthemis deniseae
- Southern tigertail, Eusynthemis guttata
- Pretty tigertail, Eusynthemis netta
- Black tigertail, Eusynthemis nigra
- Swift tigertail, Eusynthemis rentziana
- Rainforest tigertail, Eusynthemis tenera
- Mountain tigertail, Eusynthemis tillyardi
- Barrington tigertail, Eusynthemis ursa
- Beech tigertail, Eusynthemis ursula
- Golden tigertail, Eusynthemis virgula

genus: Parasynthemis

- Royal tigertail, Parasynthemis regina

genus: Synthemiopsis

- Tasmanian spotwing, Synthemiopsis gomphomacromioides

genus: Synthemis

- Swamp tigertail, Synthemis eustalacta
- Tasmanian swamp tigertail, Synthemis tasmanica

genus: Tonyosynthemis

- Clavicle tigertail, Tonyosynthemis claviculata
- Slender tigertail, Tonyosynthemis ofarrelli
