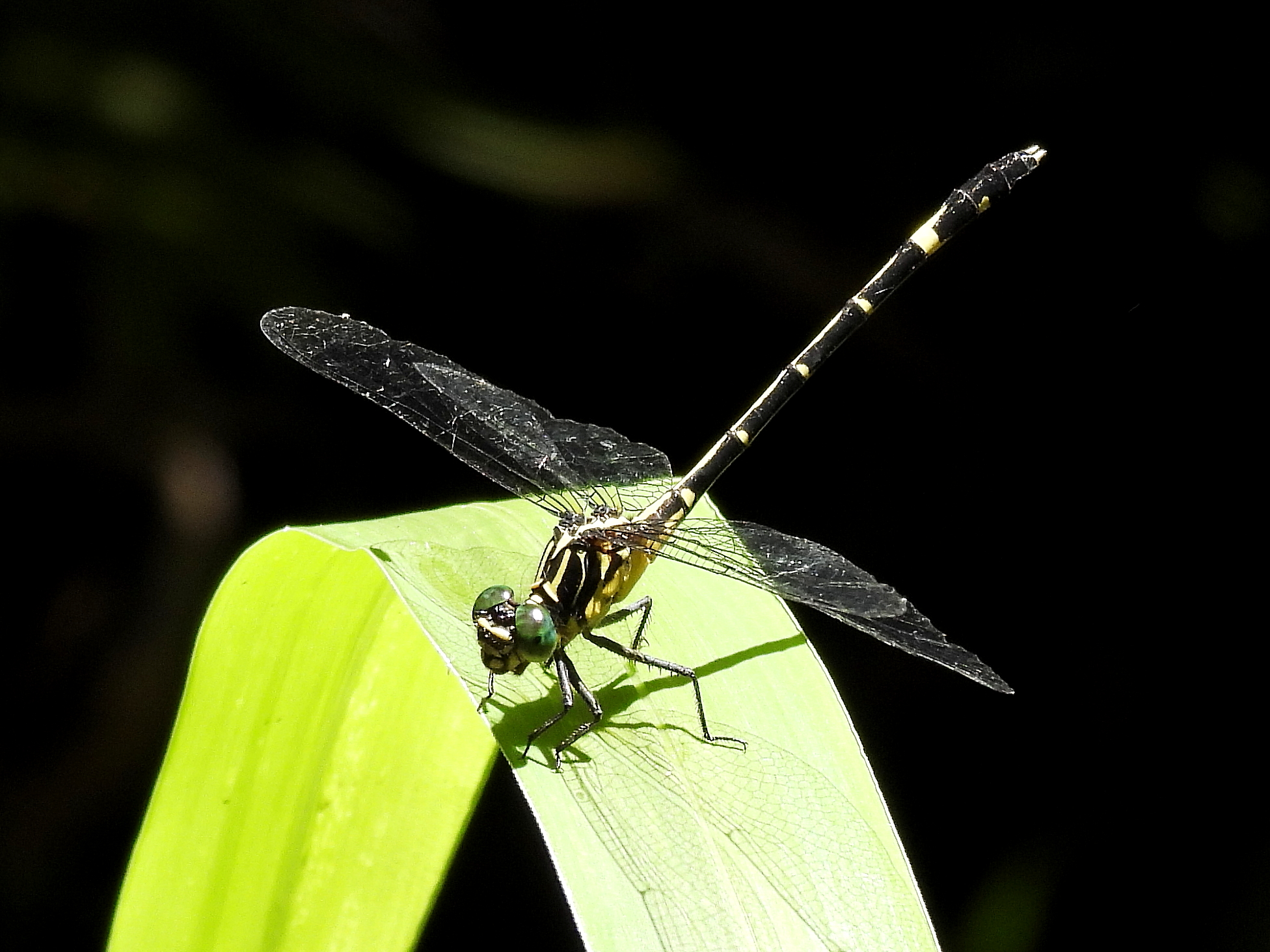
- Cairns, Queensland

Conservation status
- Least Concern (IUCN 3.1)

Scientific classification
- Kingdom: Animalia
- Phylum: Arthropoda
- Clade: Pancrustacea
- Class: Insecta
- Order: Odonata
- Suborder: Anisoptera
- Family: Gomphidae
- Genus: Austrogomphus
- Subgenus: Pleiogomphus
- Species: A. prasinus

Binomial name
- Austrogomphus prasinus Tillyard, 1906

= Austrogomphus prasinus =

Lemon-tipped hunter

Species of dragonfly

Austrogomphus prasinus, also known as Austrogomphus (Pleiogomphus) prasinus, is a species of dragonfly of the family Gomphidae, commonly known as the lemon-tipped hunter. It inhabits streams and rivers in northern Queensland, Australia.

Austrogomphus prasinus is a medium-sized, black and yellow dragonfly.

== Etymology ==
The genus name Austrogomphus combines the prefix austro- (from Latin auster, meaning “south wind”, hence “southern”) with Gomphus, a genus name derived from Greek γόμφος (gomphos, “peg” or “nail”), alluding to the clubbed shape of the abdomen in males.

The species name prasinus is Latin for "leek-green", or from Greek πράσινος (prasinus, "green"), referring to the green markings on the head and thorax, emphasising its difference from Austrogomphus arbustorum and Austrogomphus arenarius.

== Gallery ==
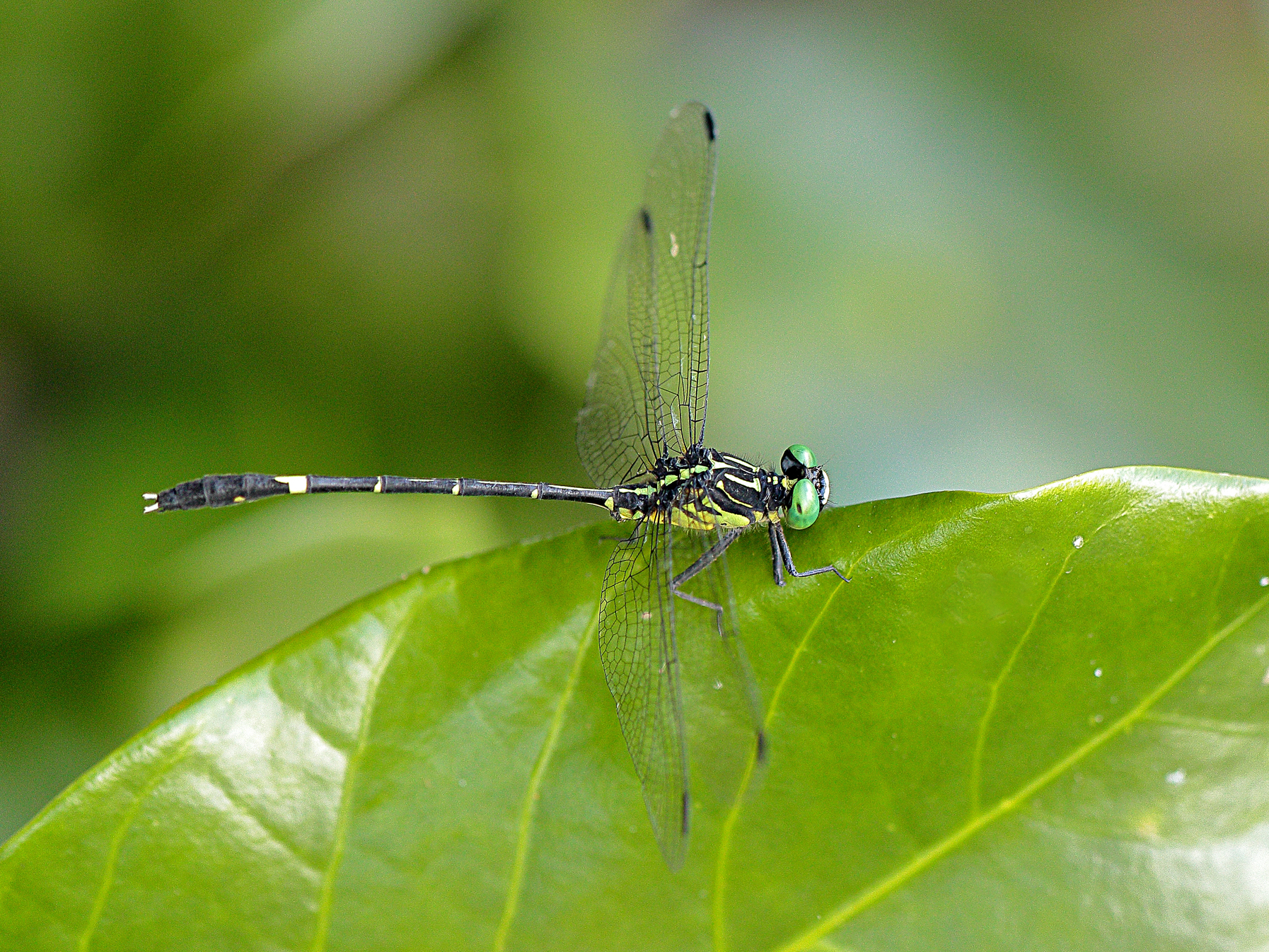
Male, Cairns

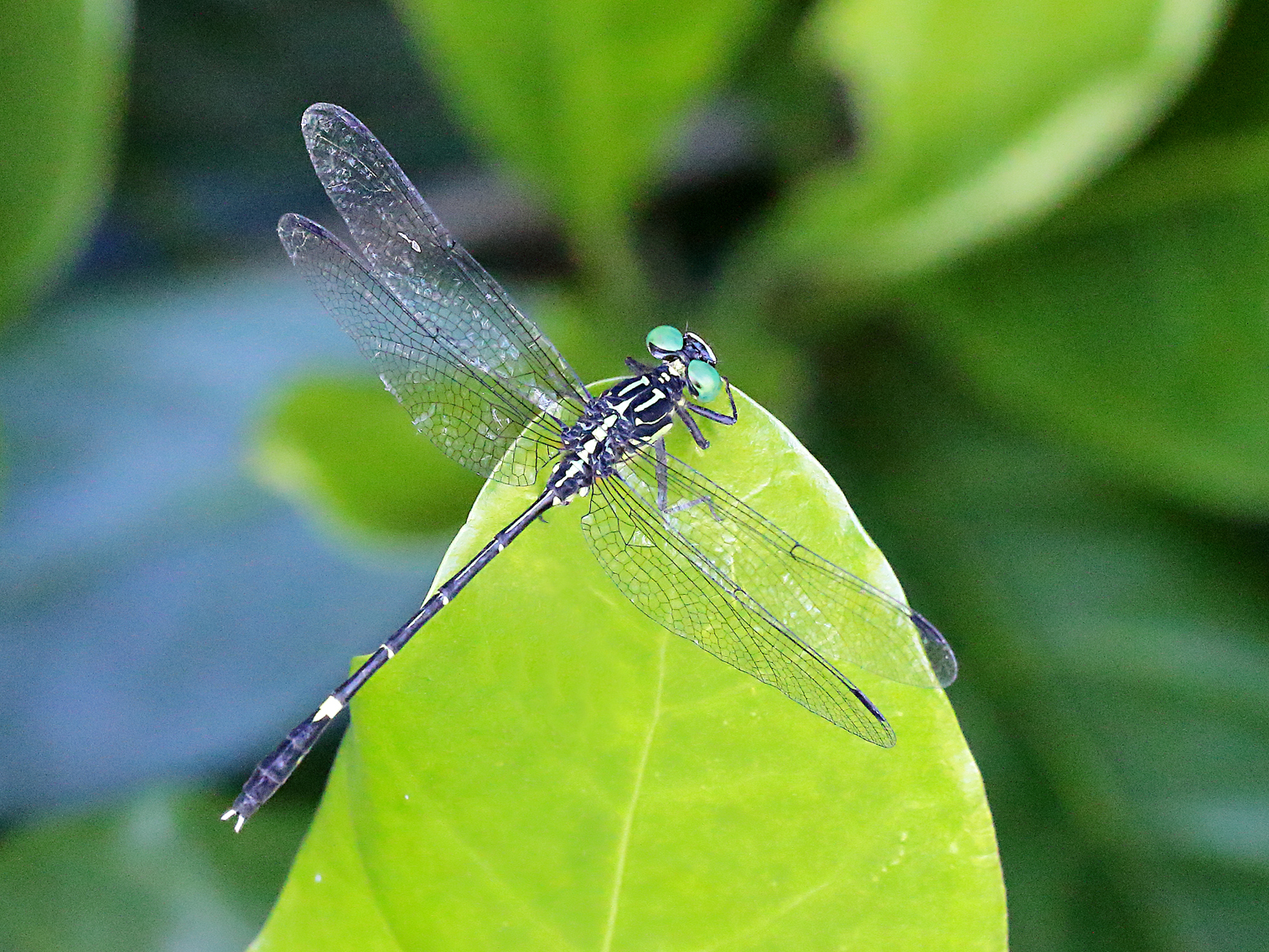
Male, Cairns

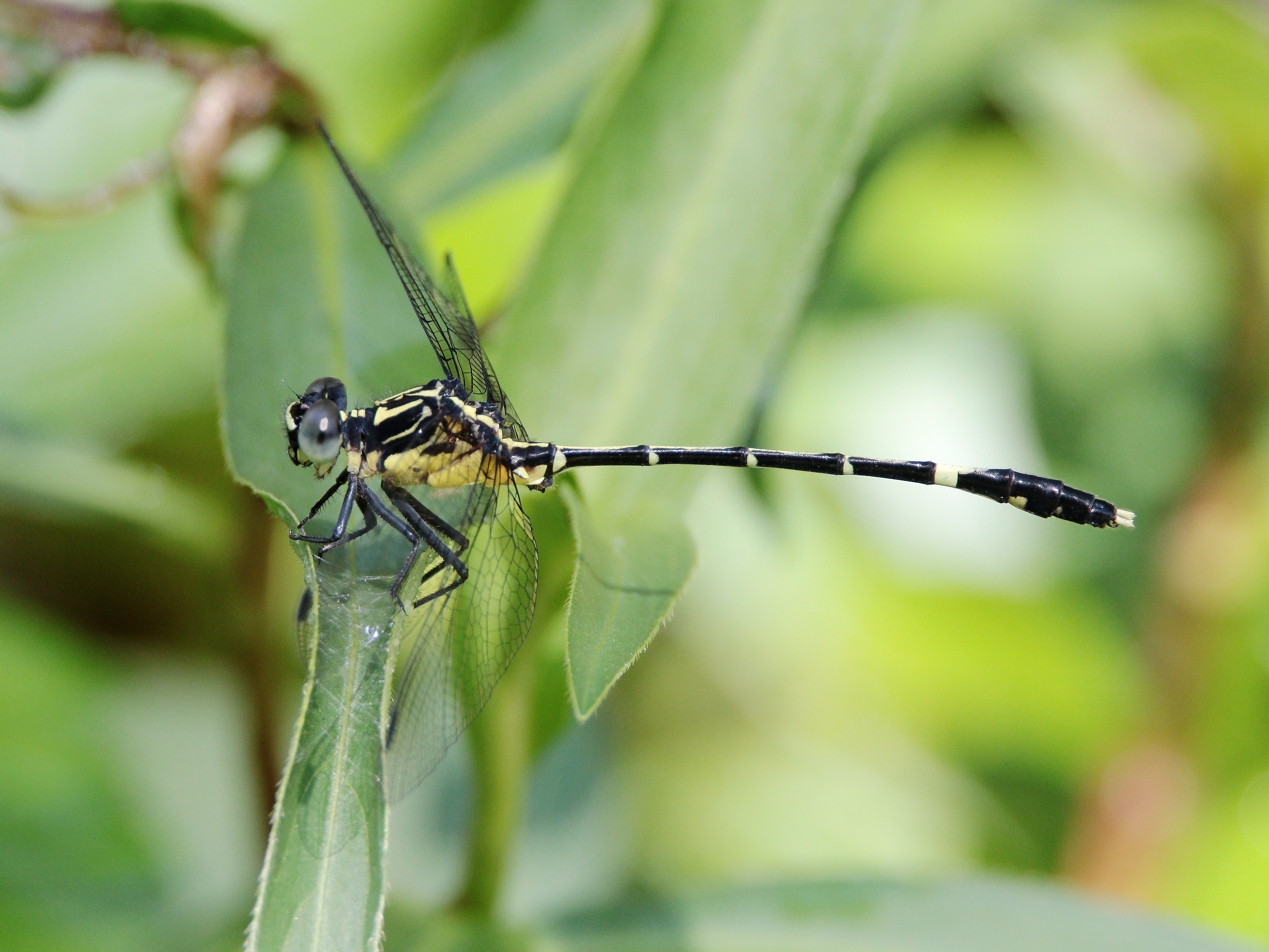
Male, side on

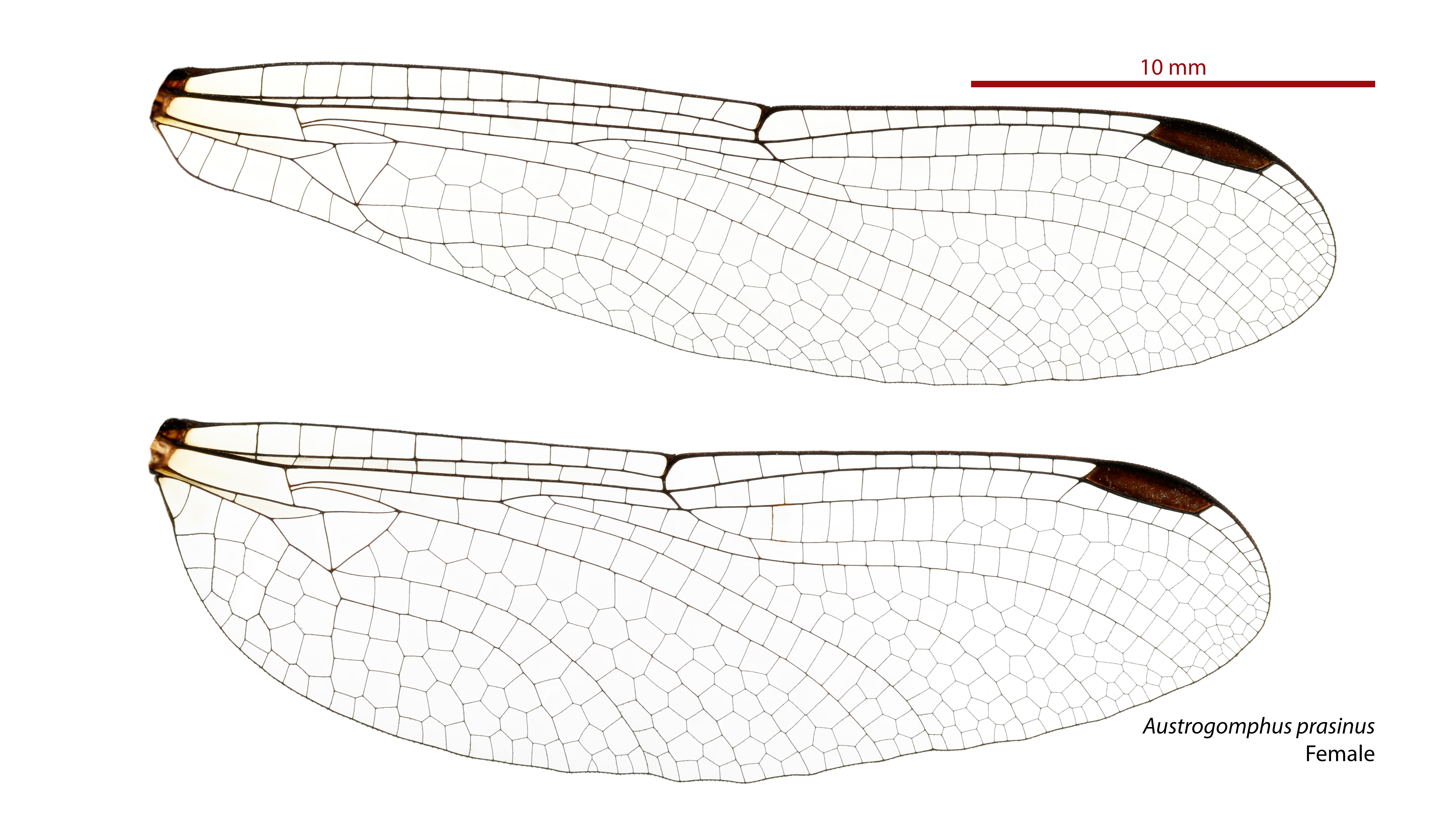
Female wings

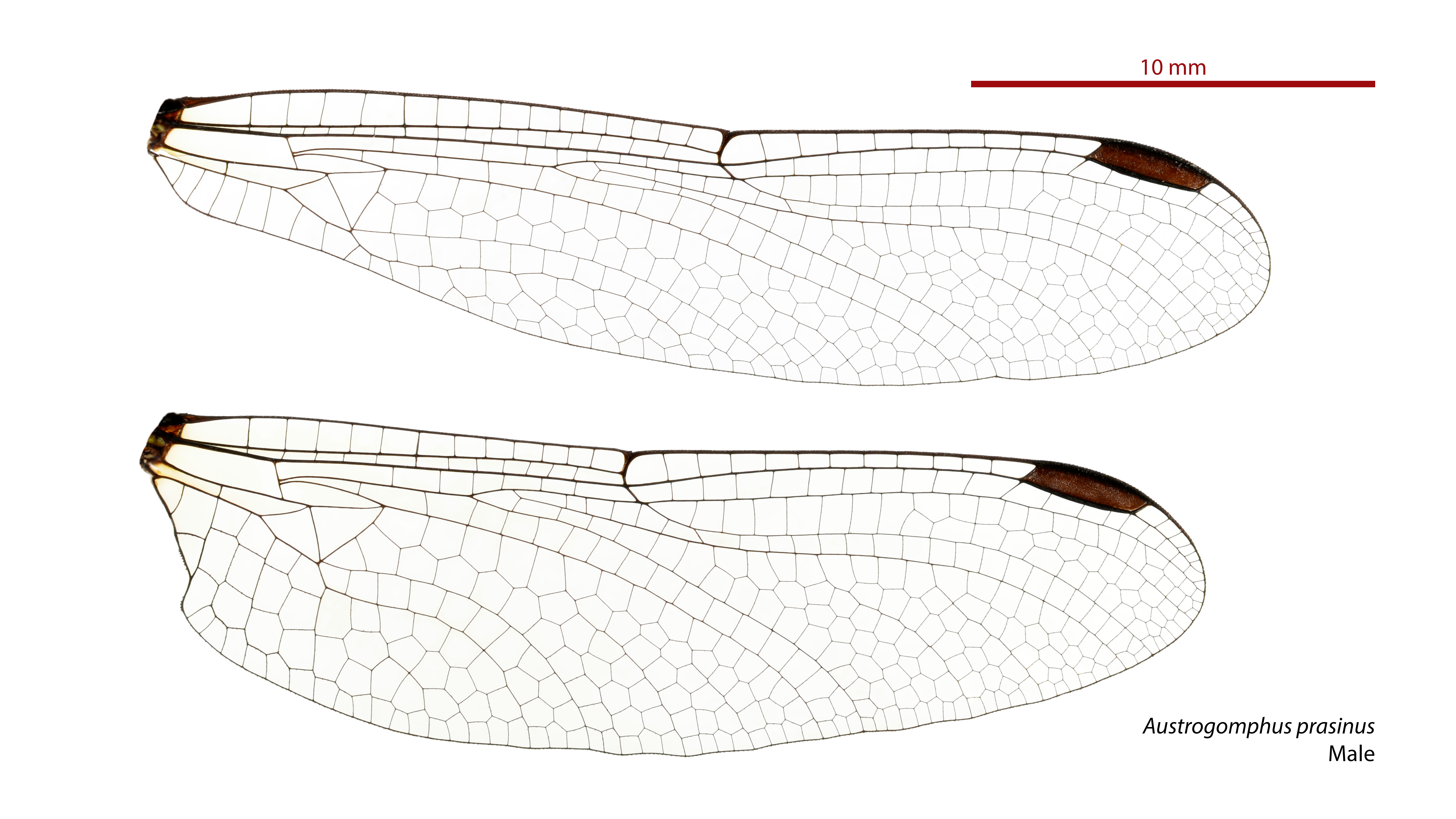
Male wings

== See also ==
- List of Odonata species of Australia
