= Antipodogomphus edentulus =

Cape York dragon

Conservation status
- Data Deficient (IUCN 3.1)

Scientific classification
- Kingdom: Animalia
- Phylum: Arthropoda
- Clade: Pancrustacea
- Class: Insecta
- Order: Odonata
- Suborder: Anisoptera
- Family: Gomphidae
- Genus: Antipodogomphus
- Species: A. edentulus

Binomial name
- Antipodogomphus edentulus Watson, 1991

Species of dragonfly

Antipodogomphus edentulus is a species of dragonfly of the family Gomphidae, commonly known as the Cape York dragon. It is endemic to Cape York, Queensland, Australia, where it has been found in rivers.

Antipodogomphus edentulus is a small to medium-sized black and yellow dragonfly with a long tail.

== Etymology ==
The genus name Antipodogomphus is derived from the Greek ἀντίποδες (antipodes, "those situated on the opposite side of the Earth"), combined with Gomphus, a genus name derived from the Greek γόμφος (gomphos, "peg" or "nail"), referring to the shape of the male abdomen. The name refers to the southern representative of that group.

The species name edentulus is Latin for "toothless", referring to the absence of teeth behind the eyes of the female, in contrast to Antipodogomphus dentosus.

== Gallery ==
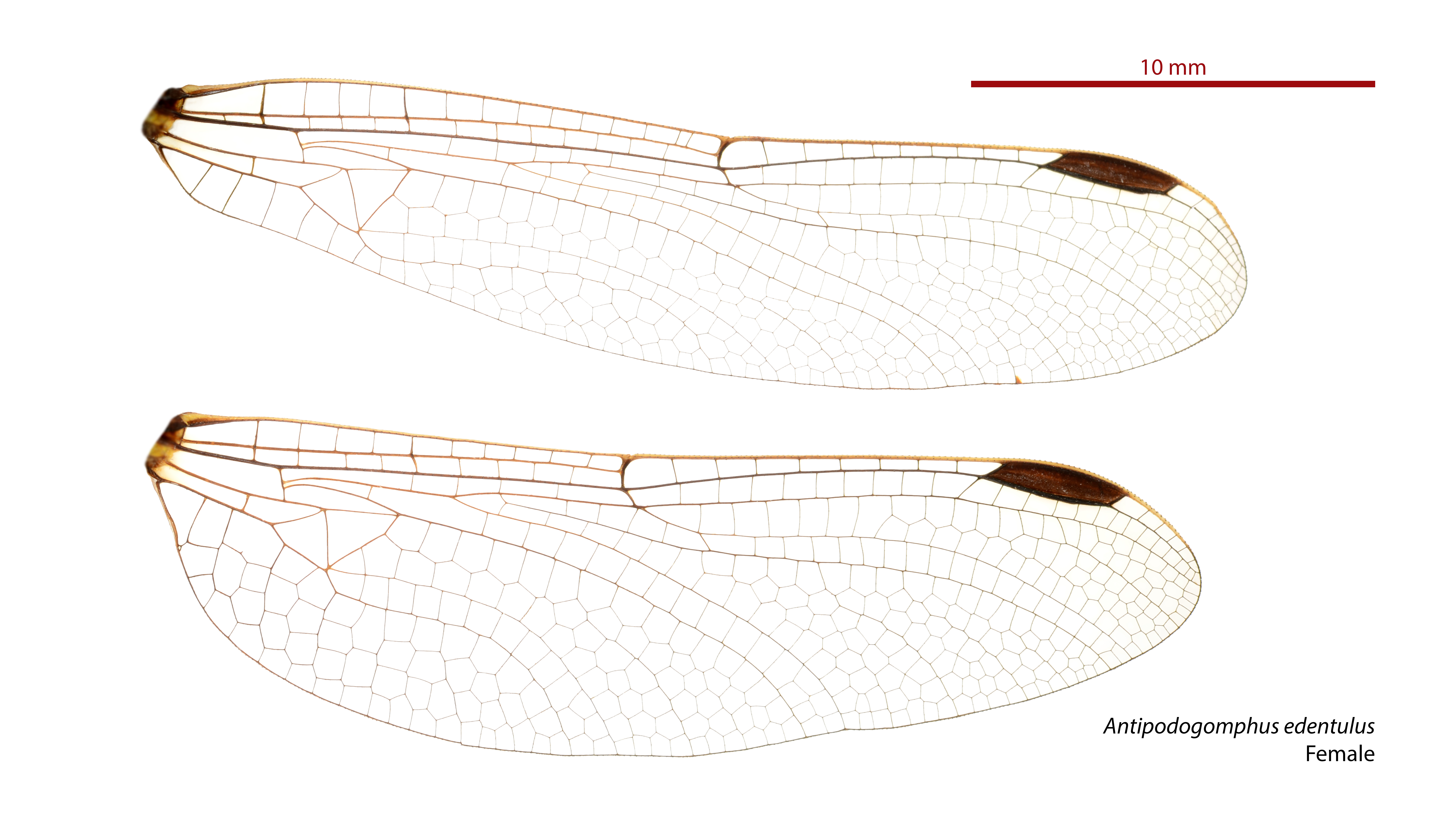
Female wings

== See also ==
- List of Odonata species of Australia
