= Orthetrum balteatum =

Speckled skimmer

Conservation status
- Near Threatened (IUCN 3.1)

Scientific classification
- Kingdom: Animalia
- Phylum: Arthropoda
- Clade: Pancrustacea
- Class: Insecta
- Order: Odonata
- Infraorder: Anisoptera
- Family: Libellulidae
- Genus: Orthetrum
- Species: O. balteatum

Binomial name
- Orthetrum balteatum Lieftinck, 1933

Species of dragonfly

Orthetrum balteatum is a freshwater dragonfly species in the family Libellulidae, present in northern Australia and New Guinea. The common name for this species is speckled skimmer.

Orthetrum balteatum is a medium-sized, black dragonfly with yellow markings. The sides of its body are dark, and it has clear wings without any coloured markings.

== Etymology ==
The genus name Orthetrum is derived from the Greek ὀρθός (orthos, "straight") and ἦτρον (ētron, "abdomen"), referring to the parallel-sided abdomen of the genus.

The species name balteatum is derived from the Latin balteus ("girdle" or "belt"), likely referring to markings on the male abdomen.

== Gallery ==
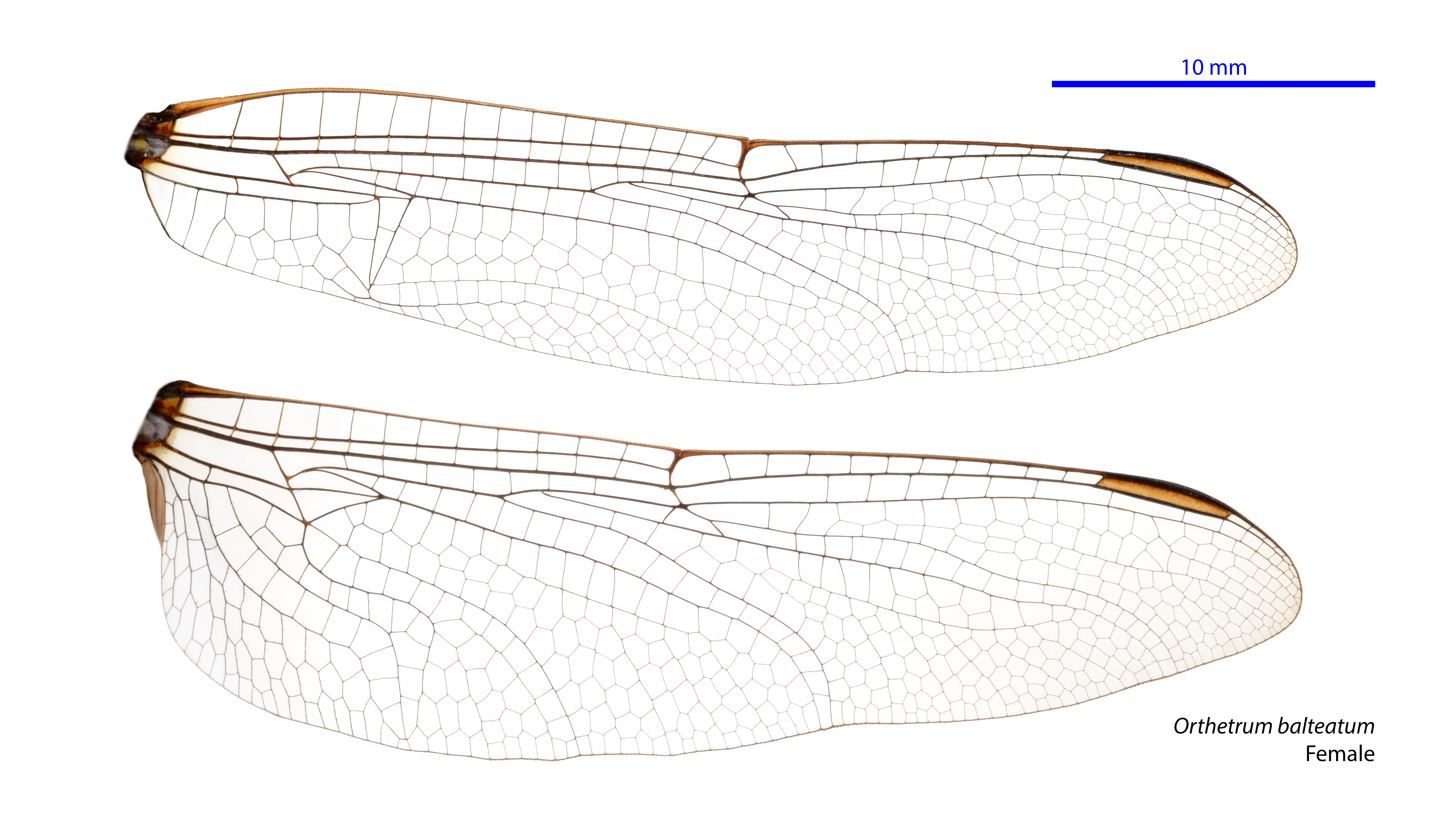
Female wings

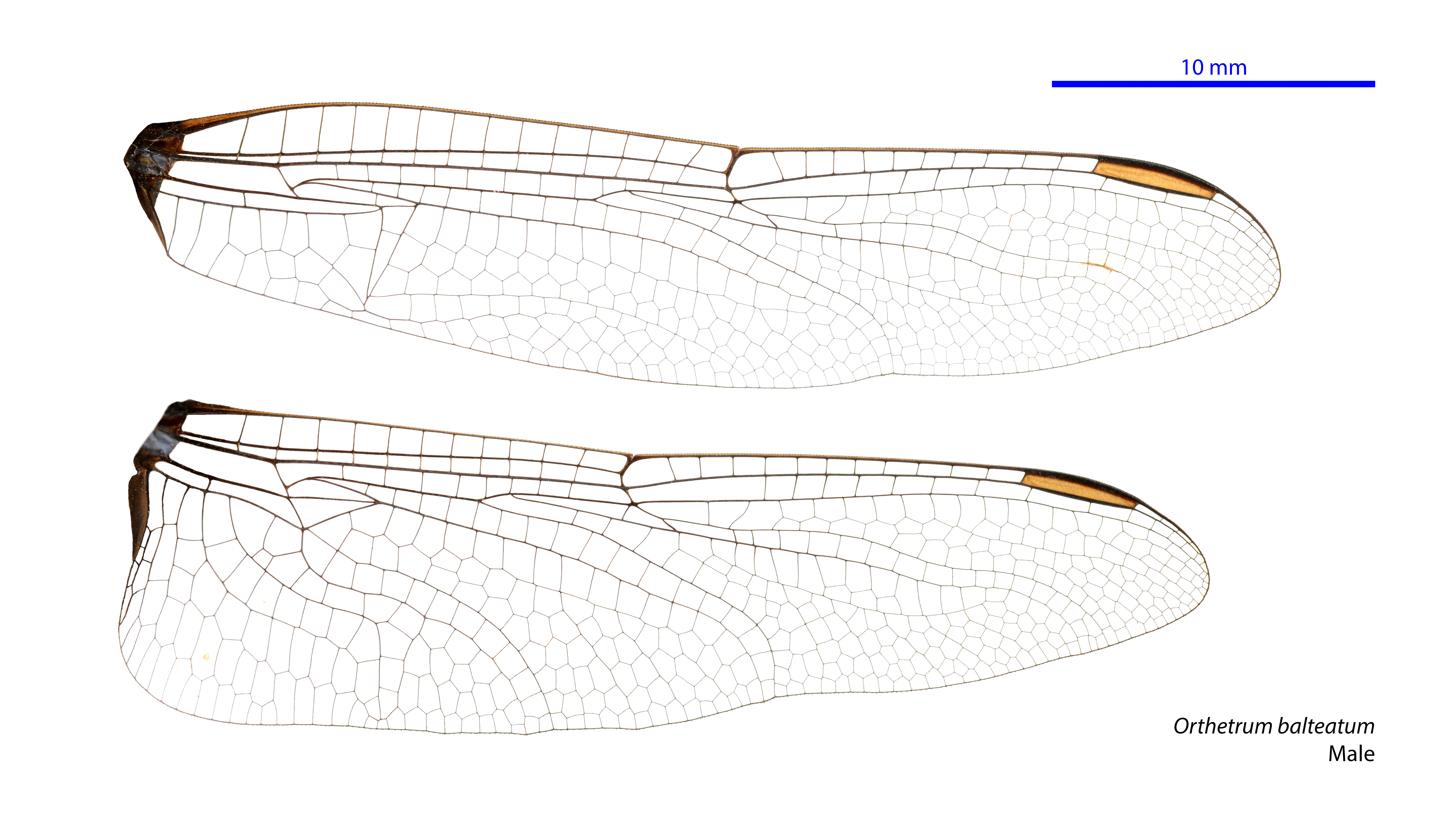
Male wings

== See also ==
- List of Odonata species of Australia
