= Miniargiolestes =

Stream flatwing

Conservation status
- Least Concern (IUCN 3.1)

Scientific classification
- Kingdom: Animalia
- Phylum: Arthropoda
- Clade: Pancrustacea
- Class: Insecta
- Order: Odonata
- Suborder: Zygoptera
- Family: Argiolestidae
- Genus: Miniargiolestes; Theischinger, 1998
- Species: M. minimus

Binomial name
- Miniargiolestes minimus (Tillyard, 1908)

Synonyms
- Argiolestes minimus Tillyard, 1908

Genus of damselflies

Miniargiolestes is a monotypic genus of damselflies in the family Argiolestidae. The single species of this genus, Miniargiolestes minimus, commonly known as a stream flatwing, is a small damselfly, metallic black to green in colour with white markings. It is endemic to south-western Australia, where it inhabits streams.

== Etymology ==
The genus name Miniargiolestes combines the Latin minimus ("very small" or "smallest") with Argiolestes, the name of a related genus, referring to the small size of this damselfly.

The species name minimus is Latin for "very small", likewise referring to its diminutive size.

== Gallery ==
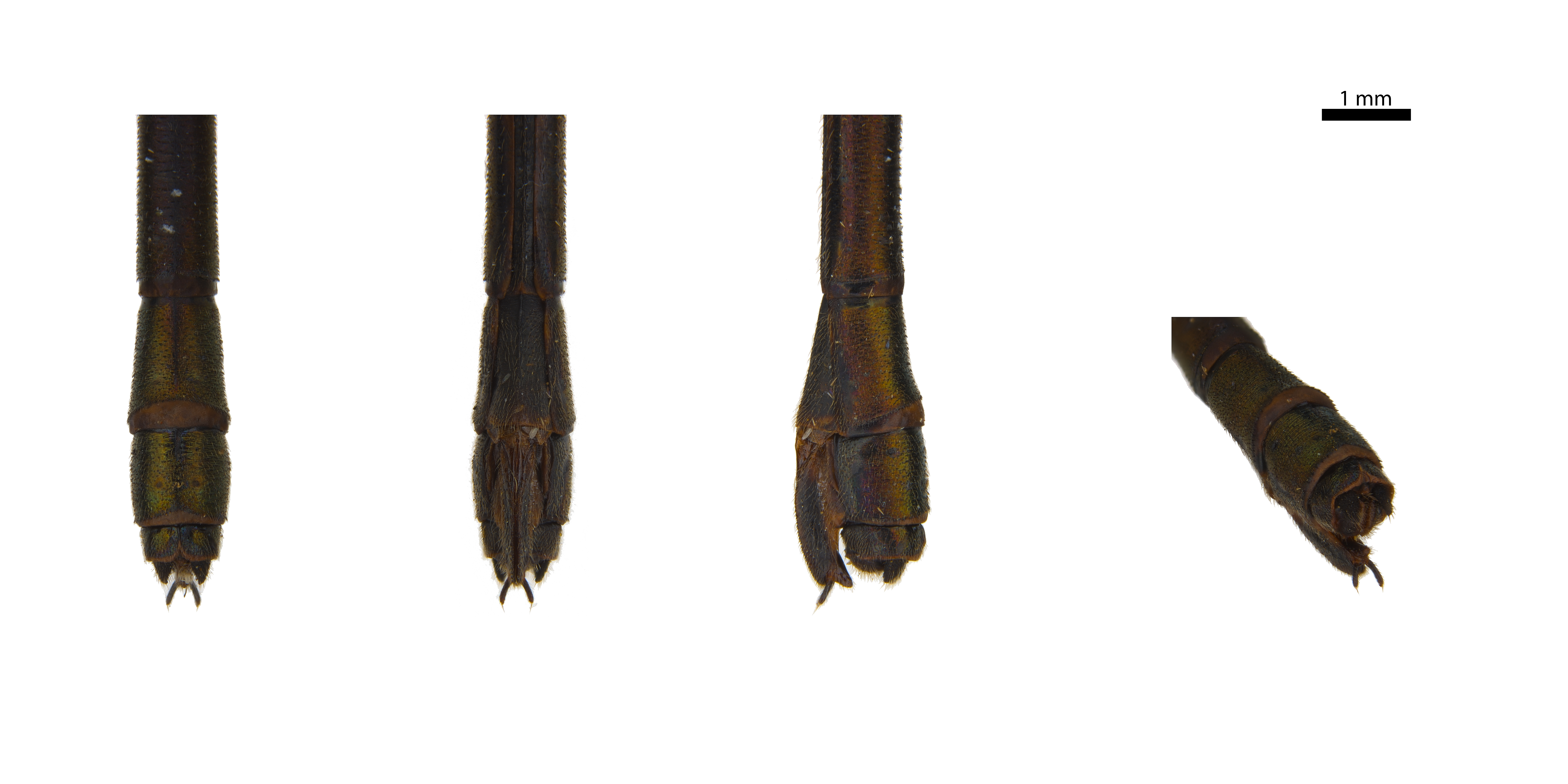
Tip of female Miniargiolestes minimus tail

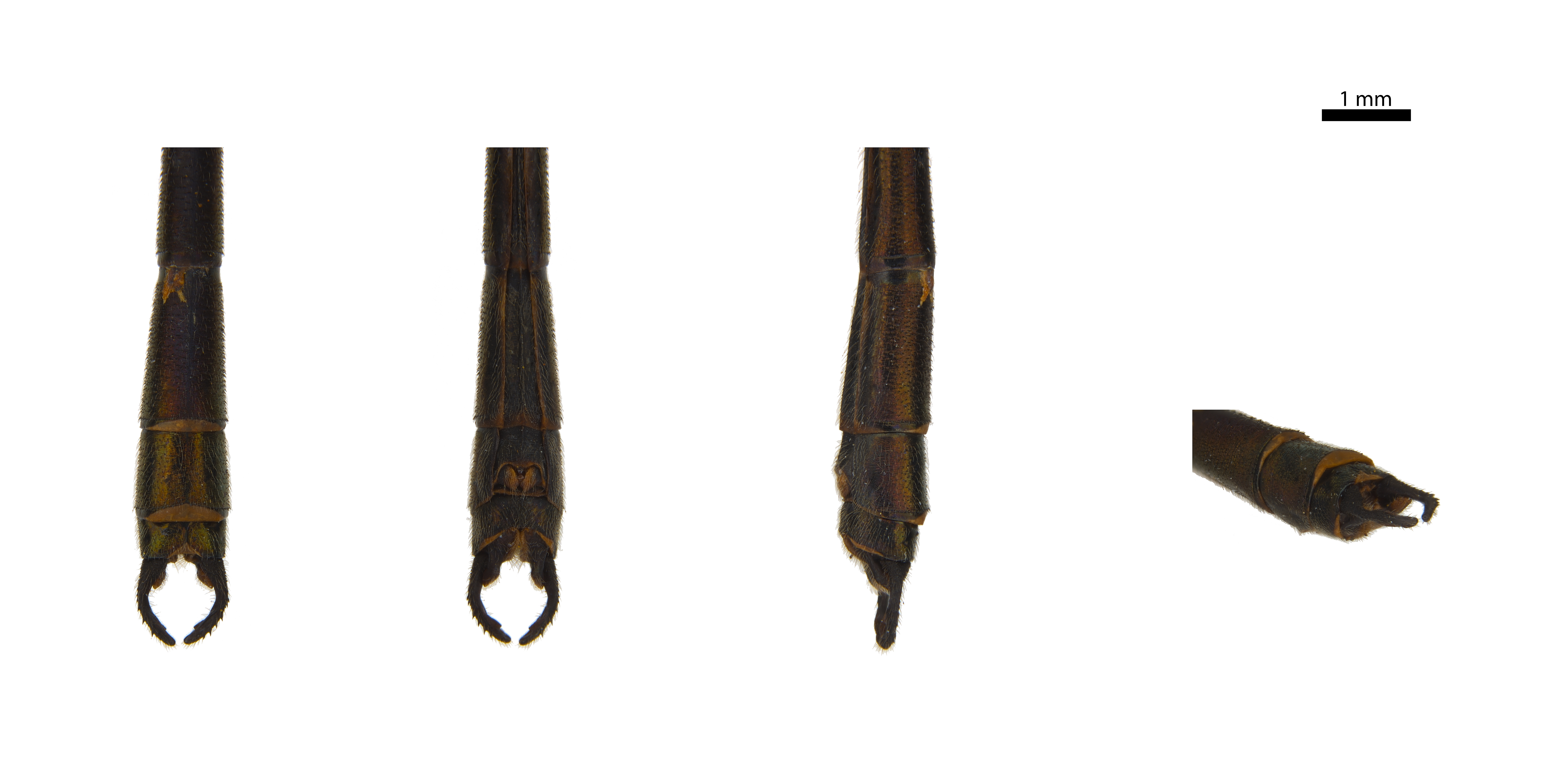
Tip of male Miniargiolestes minimus tail

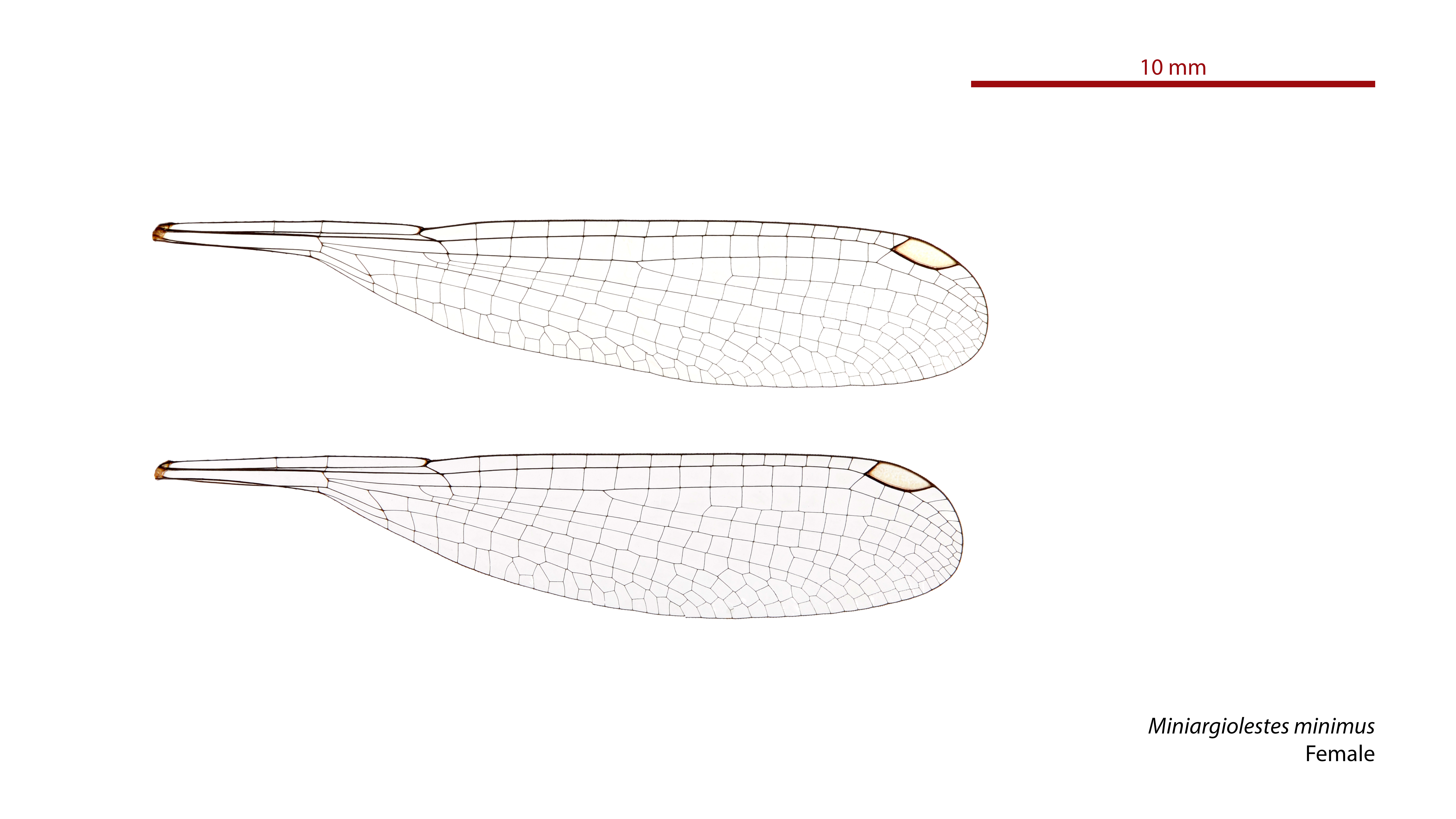
Female Miniargiolestes minimus wings

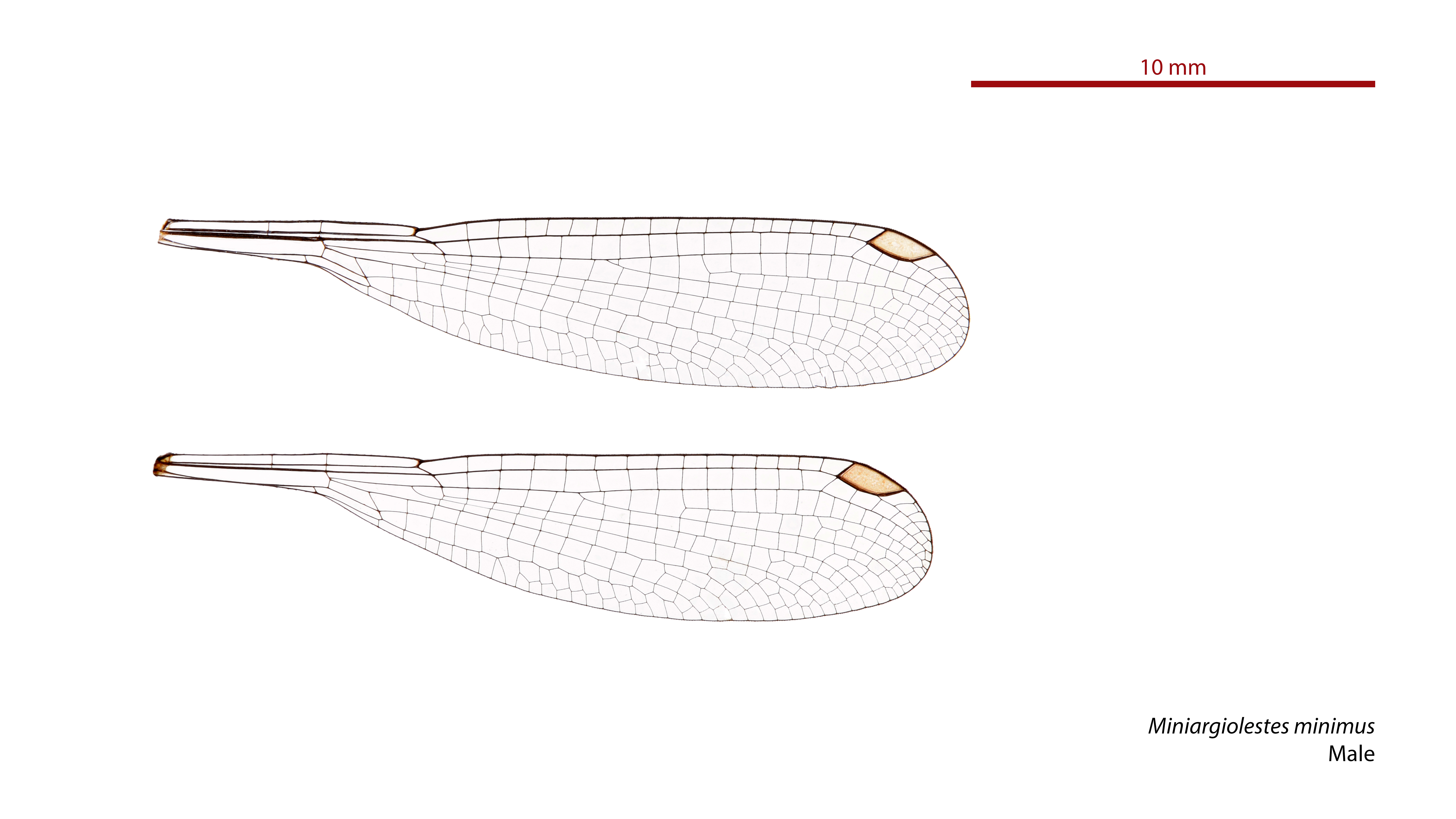
Male Miniargiolestes minimus wings

== See also ==
- List of Odonata species of Australia
