= Antipodogomphus hodgkini =

Pilbara dragon

Scientific classification
- Kingdom: Animalia
- Phylum: Arthropoda
- Clade: Pancrustacea
- Class: Insecta
- Order: Odonata
- Suborder: Anisoptera
- Family: Gomphidae
- Genus: Antipodogomphus
- Species: A. hodgkini

Binomial name
- Antipodogomphus hodgkini Watson, 1969

Species of dragonfly

Antipodogomphus hodgkini is a species of dragonfly of the family Gomphidae, known as the Pilbara dragon. It is endemic to the Pilbara region of Western Australia, where it inhabits rivers, streams and pools.

Antipodogomphus hodgkini is a small to medium-sized black and yellow dragonfly with a long tail.

Antipodogomphus hodgkini was collected and named by Tony Watson and Gunter Theiscinger in Western Australia in 1969.

== Etymology ==
The genus name Antipodogomphus is derived from the Greek ἀντίποδες (antipodes, "those situated on the opposite side of the Earth"), combined with Gomphus, a genus name derived from the Greek γόμφος (gomphos, "peg" or "nail"), referring to the shape of the male abdomen. The name refers to the southern representative of that group.

In 1969, Tony Watson named this species hodgkini, an eponym honouring E. P. Hodgkin (1908-1998) of the Department of Zoology, University of Western Australia, who supervised the early work and provided the original specimens.

== Gallery ==
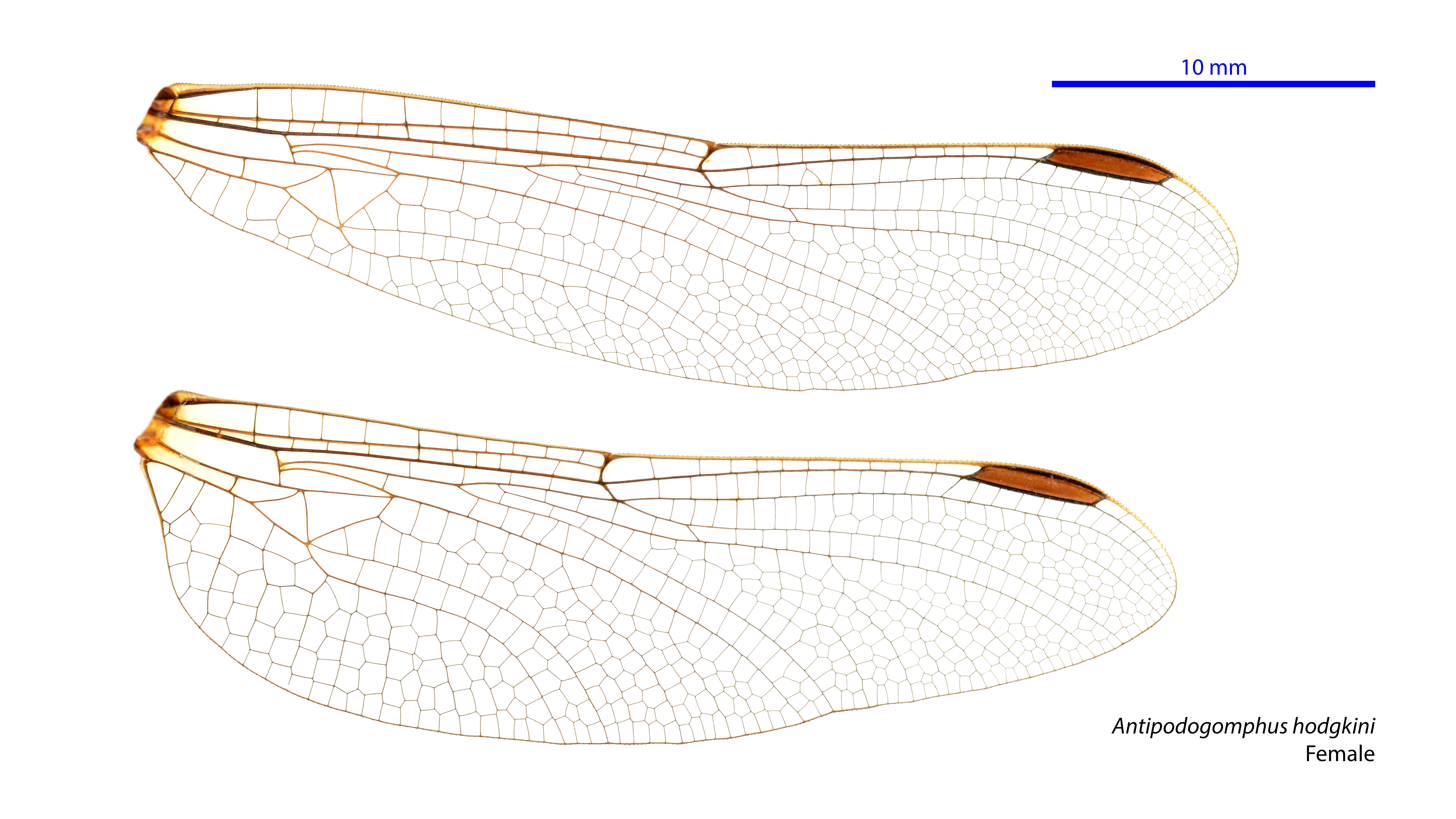
Female wings

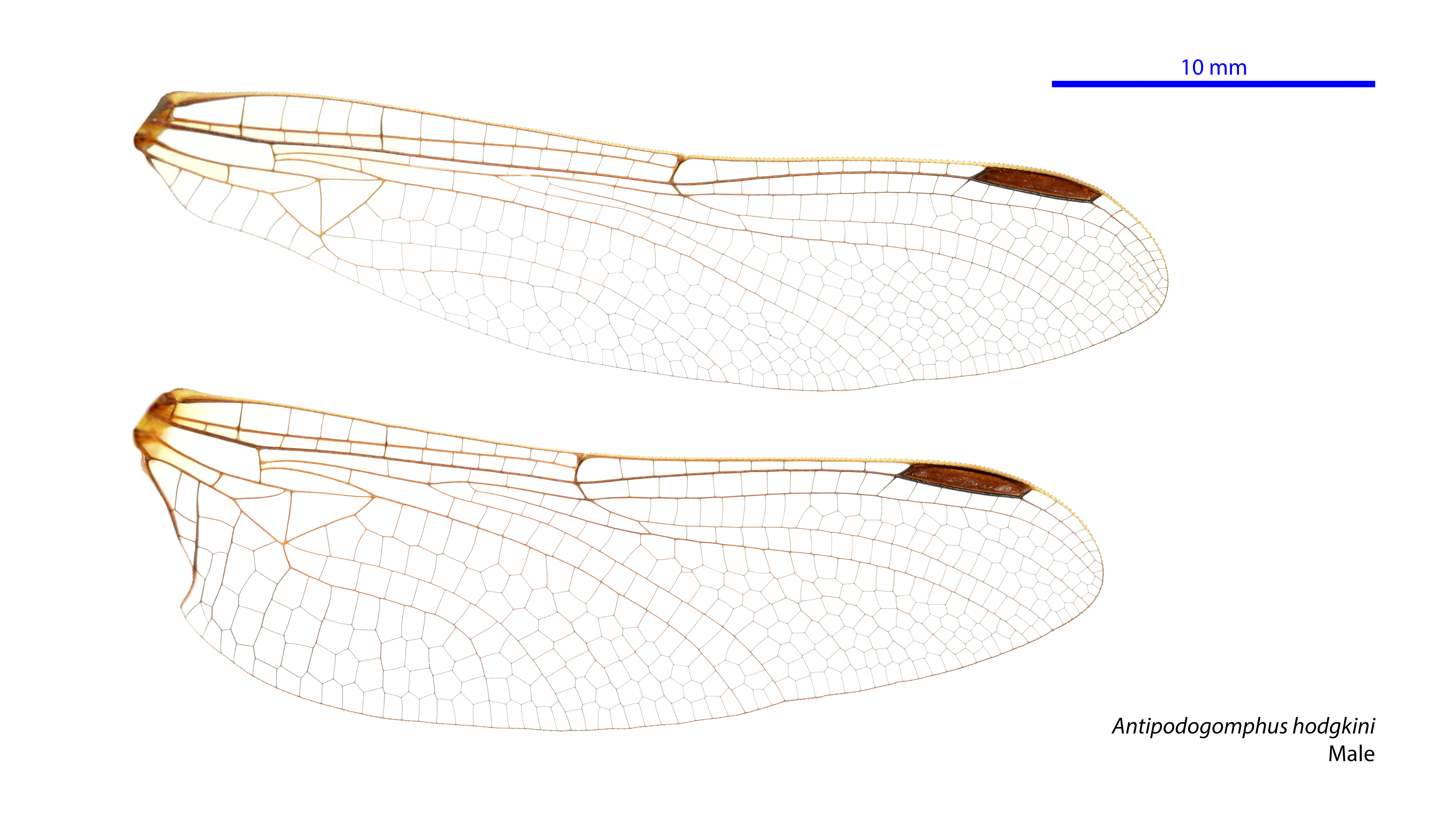
Male wings

== See also ==
- List of Odonata species of Australia
