= Antipodogomphus dentosus =

Top End dragon

Conservation status
- Data Deficient (IUCN 3.1)

Scientific classification
- Kingdom: Animalia
- Phylum: Arthropoda
- Clade: Pancrustacea
- Class: Insecta
- Order: Odonata
- Suborder: Anisoptera
- Family: Gomphidae
- Genus: Antipodogomphus
- Species: A. dentosus

Binomial name
- Antipodogomphus dentosus Watson, 1991

Species of dragonfly

Antipodogomphus dentosus is a species of dragonfly of the family Gomphidae, commonly known as the Top End dragon. It is endemic to Northern Territory, Australia, where it has been found in rivers.

Antipodogomphus dentosus is a small to medium-sized black and yellow dragonfly with a long tail.

== Etymology ==
The genus name Antipodogomphus is derived from the Greek ἀντίποδες (antipodes, "those situated on the opposite side of the Earth"), combined with Gomphus, a genus name derived from the Greek γόμφος (gomphos, "peg" or "nail"), referring to the shape of the male abdomen. The name refers to the southern representative of that group.

The species name dentosus is Latin for "toothed" or "having teeth", referring to the large teeth behind the eyes of the female.

== Gallery ==
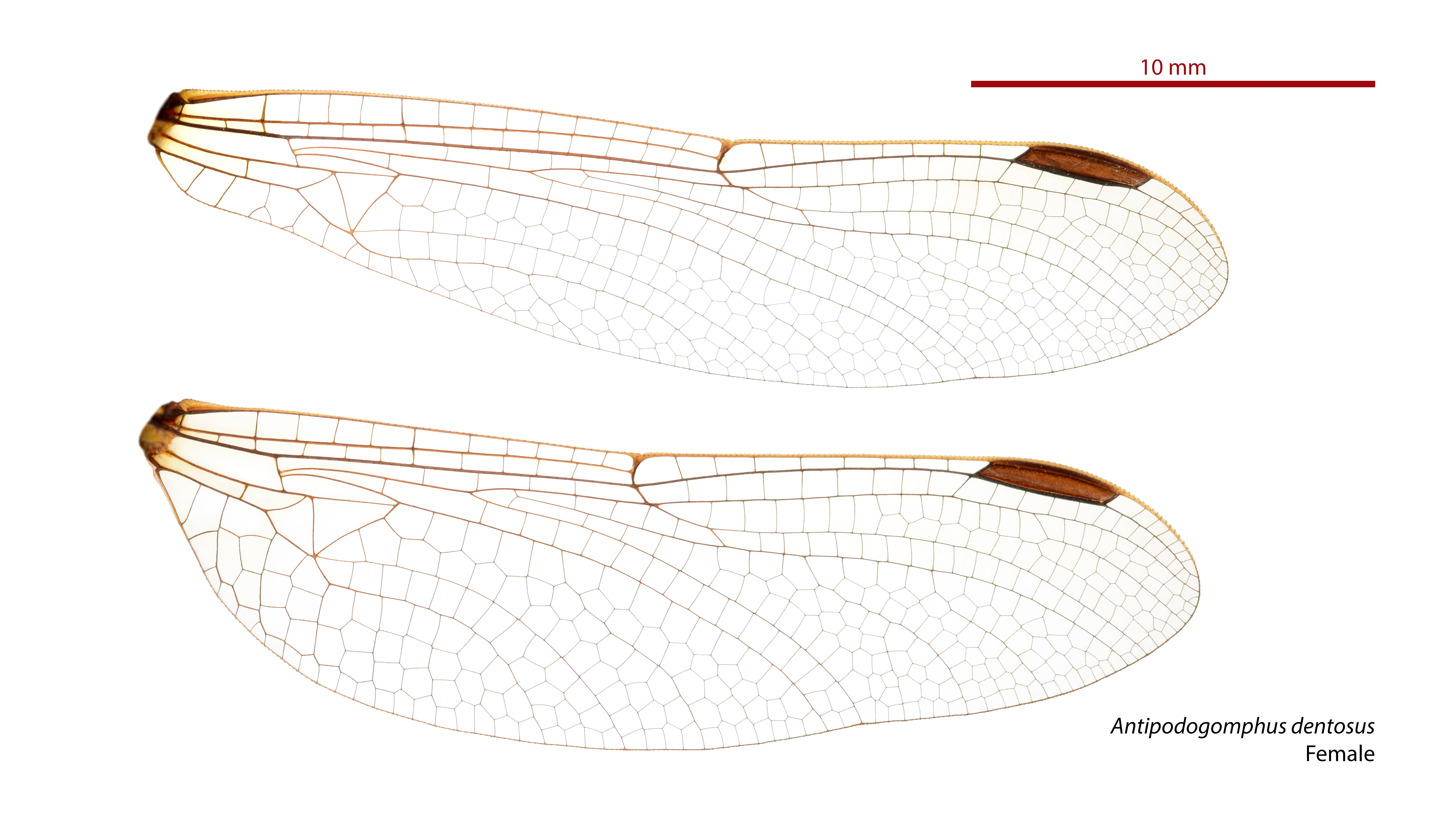
Female wings

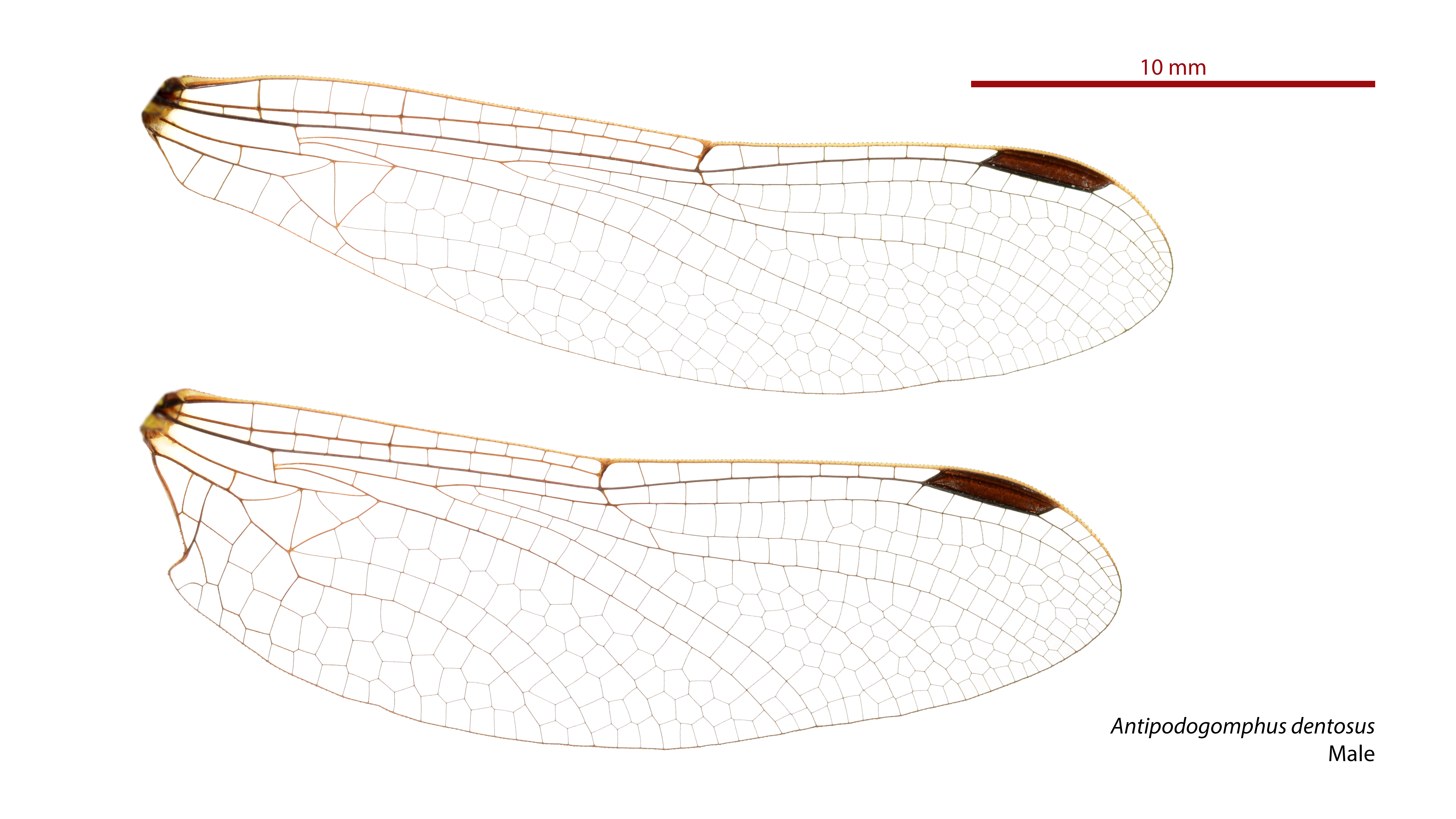
Male wings

== See also ==
- List of Odonata species of Australia
