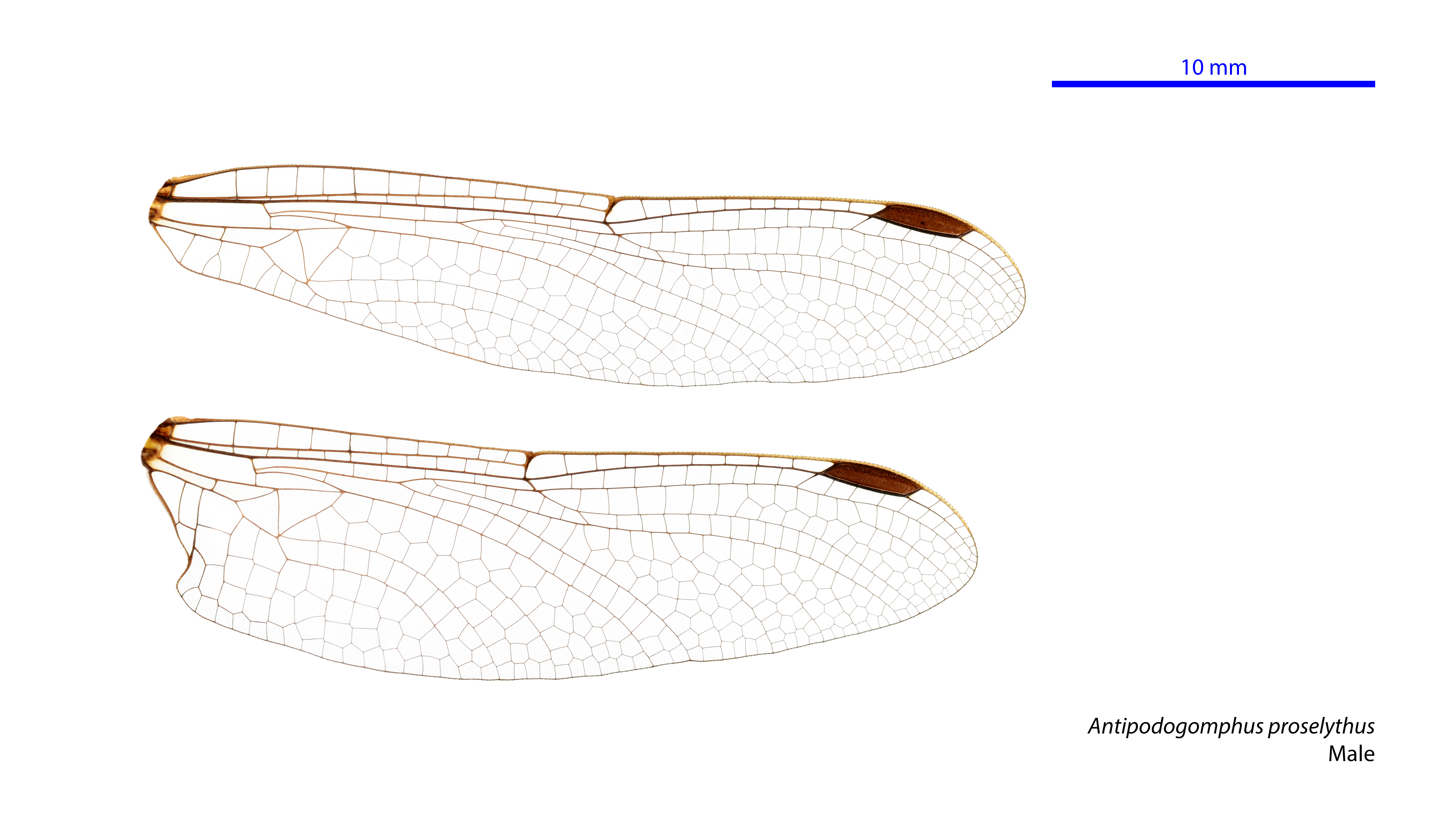
- Antipodogomphus proselythus male wings

Scientific classification
- Kingdom: Animalia
- Phylum: Arthropoda
- Clade: Pancrustacea
- Class: Insecta
- Order: Odonata
- Suborder: Anisoptera
- Family: Gomphidae
- Genus: Antipodogomphus; Fraser, 1951

= Antipodogomphus =

Genus of dragonflies

Antipodogomphus is a genus of dragonflies in the family Gomphidae, endemic to Australia. The species are small to medium-sized with black with yellow markings. They are commonly known as dragons.

== Species ==
The genus Antipodogomphus includes the following species:

- Antipodogomphus acolythus (Martin, 1901) - southern dragon
- Antipodogomphus dentosus Watson, 1991 - Top End dragon
- Antipodogomphus edentulus Watson, 1991 - Cape York dragon
- Antipodogomphus hodgkini Watson, 1969 - Pilbara dragon
- Antipodogomphus neophytus Fraser, 1958 - northern dragon
- Antipodogomphus proselythus (Martin, 1901) - spinehead dragon

== Etymology ==
The genus name Antipodogomphus is derived from the Greek ἀντίποδες (antipodes, "those situated on the opposite side of the Earth"), combined with Gomphus, a genus name derived from the Greek γόμφος (gomphos, "peg" or "nail"), referring to the shape of the male abdomen. The name refers to the southern representative of that group.
