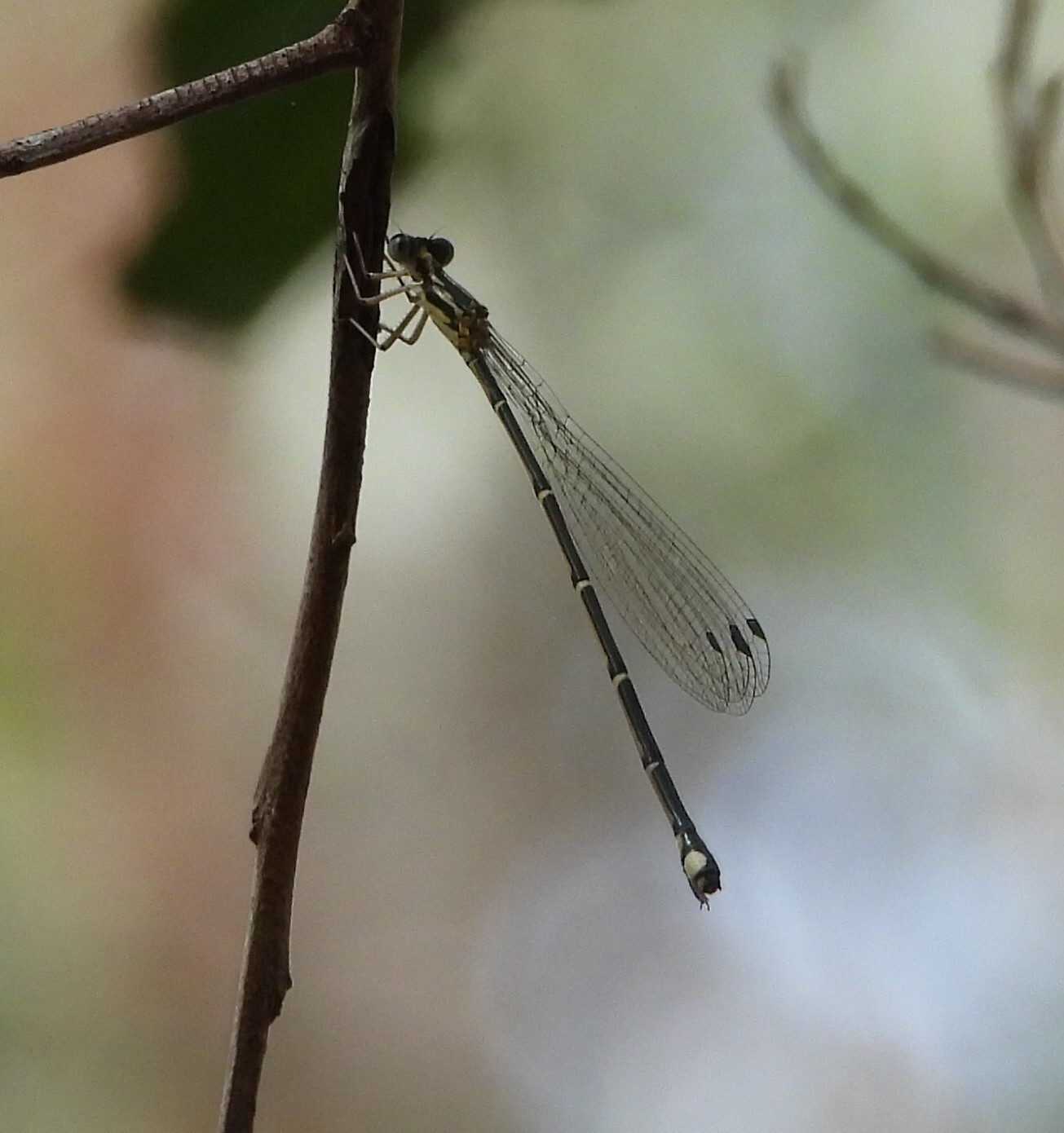
- Female

Conservation status
- Least Concern (IUCN 3.1)

Scientific classification
- Kingdom: Animalia
- Phylum: Arthropoda
- Clade: Pancrustacea
- Class: Insecta
- Order: Odonata
- Suborder: Zygoptera
- Family: Isostictidae
- Genus: Labidiosticta; Watson, 1991
- Species: L. vallisi

Binomial name
- Labidiosticta vallisi (Fraser, 1955)

Synonyms
- Phasmosticta vallisi Fraser, 1955

= Labidiosticta =

Large wiretail

Genus of damselflies

Labidiosticta is a monotypic genus of damselflies belonging to the family Isostictidae. The single species of this genus, Labidiosticta vallisi, commonly known as a large wiretail, is endemic to eastern Australia, where it inhabits streams and rivers.

Labidiosticta vallisi is a large dragonfly, that is a dull, dark bronze in colour.

== Etymology ==
The genus name Labidiosticta is derived from the Greek λαβίδιον (labidion, "small forceps" or "tweezers") and στικτός (stiktos, "spotted" or "marked"). The suffix -sticta is commonly used in names of taxa within the subfamily Isostictinae.

In 1955, F. C. Fraser named the species vallisi, an eponym honouring Eliah Close ("Closie") Vallis (1890-1965), collector of the type specimen.

== Gallery ==
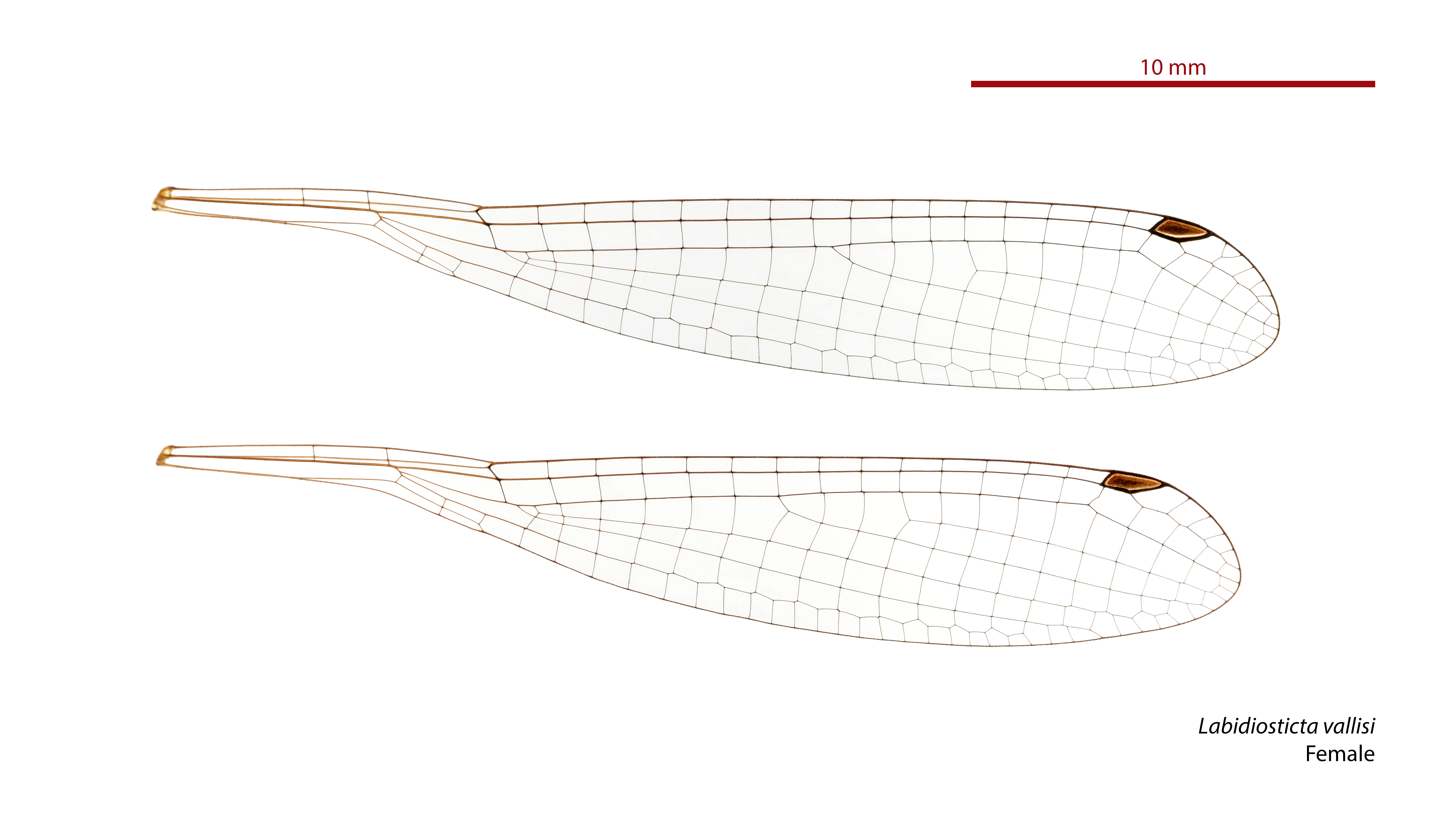
Female Labidiosticta vallisi wings

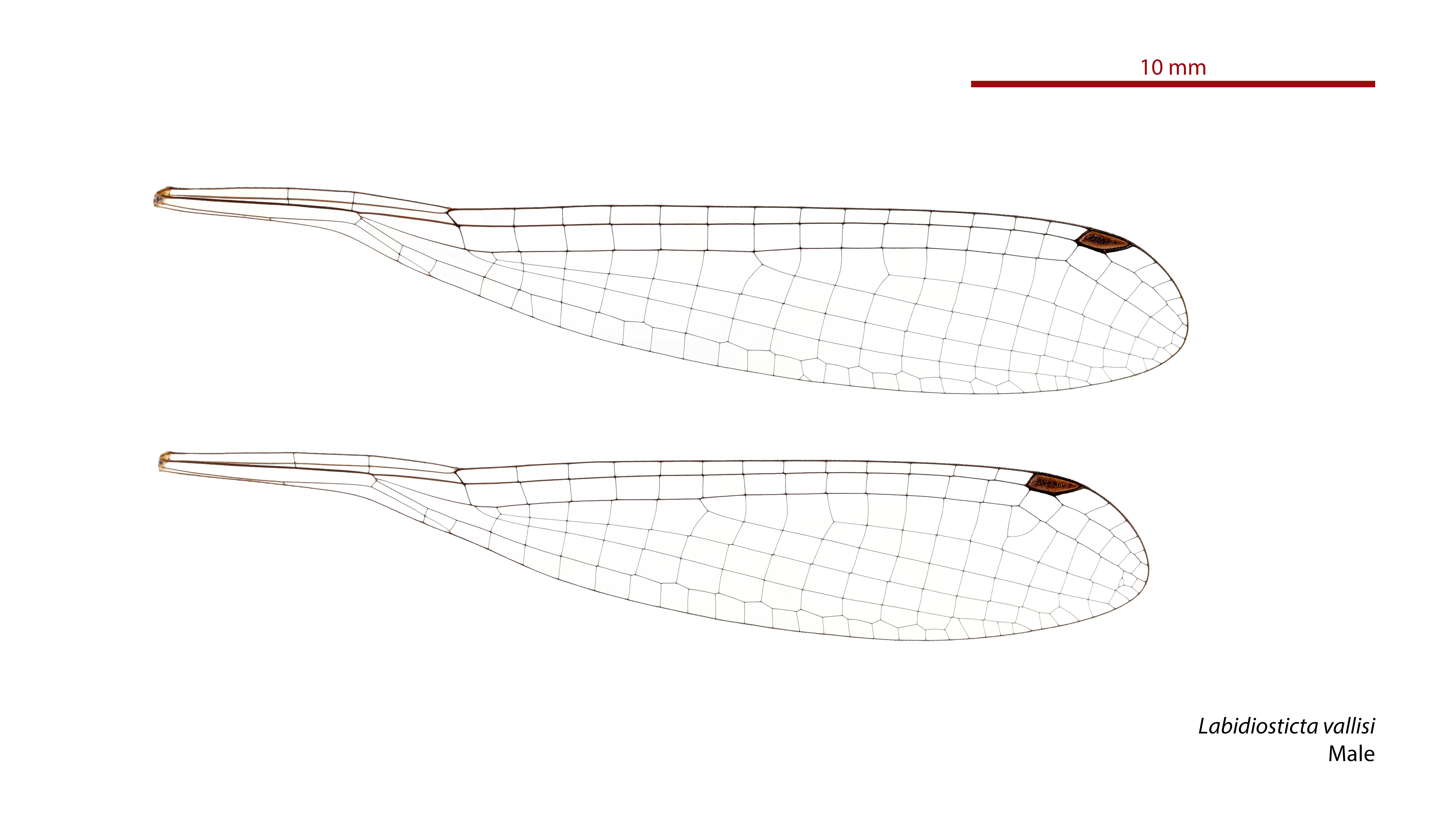
Male Labidiosticta vallisi wings
