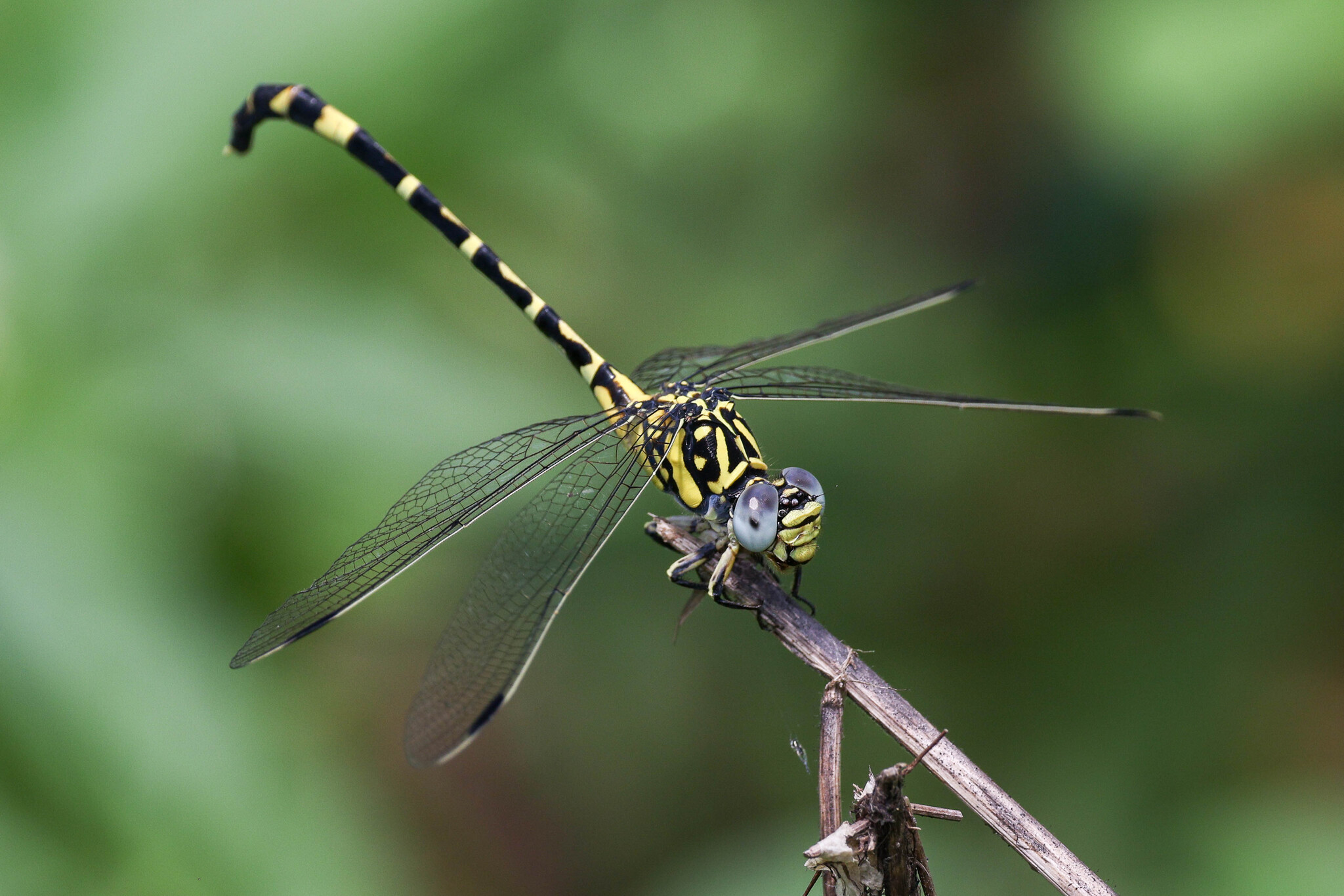

Conservation status
- Least Concern (IUCN 3.1)

Scientific classification
- Kingdom: Animalia
- Phylum: Arthropoda
- Clade: Pancrustacea
- Class: Insecta
- Order: Odonata
- Suborder: Anisoptera
- Family: Gomphidae
- Genus: Antipodogomphus
- Species: A. proselythus

Binomial name
- Antipodogomphus proselythus (Martin, 1901)

Synonyms
- Austrogomphus proselythus Martin, 1901; Austrogomphus arenarius Tillyard, 1906; Antipodogomphus proselytus Fraser, 1951

= Antipodogomphus proselythus =

Spinehead dragon

Species of dragonfly

Antipodogomphus proselythus is a species of dragonfly of the family Gomphidae, commonly known as the spinehead dragon. It is endemic to Queensland, Australia, where it inhabits streams, rivers and pools.

== Etymology ==
The genus name Antipodogomphus is derived from the Greek ἀντίποδες (antipodes, "those situated on the opposite side of the Earth"), combined with Gomphus, a genus name derived from the Greek γόμφος (gomphos, "peg" or "nail"), referring to the shape of the male abdomen. The name refers to the southern representative of that group.

The species names proselythus and acolythus are derived respectively from the Greek προσήλυτος (prosēlytos, "one that has arrived") and ἀκόλουθος (akolouthos, "the following one"). The names likely refer to two species placed in the genus Austrogomphus.

== Gallery ==
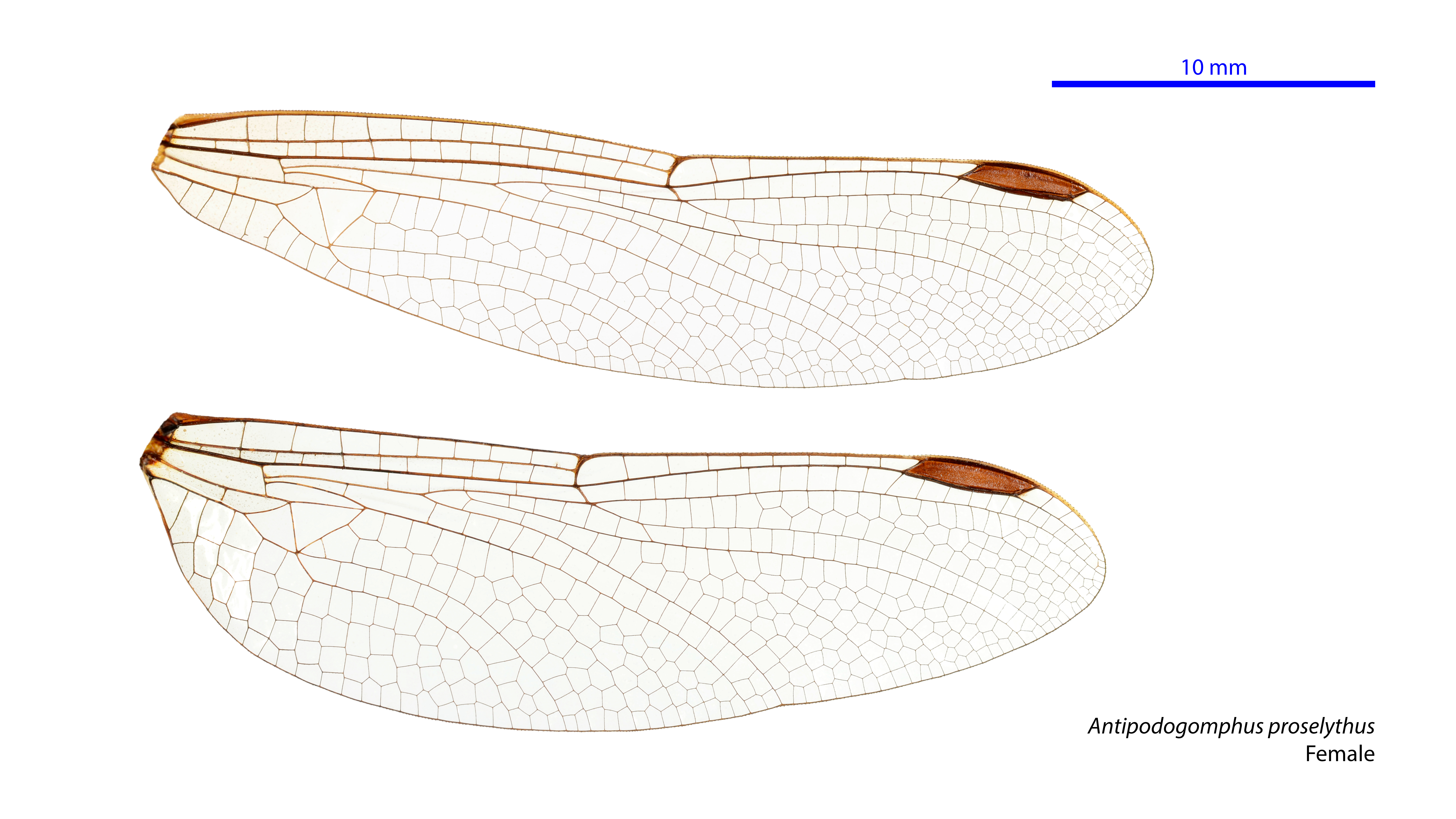
Female wings

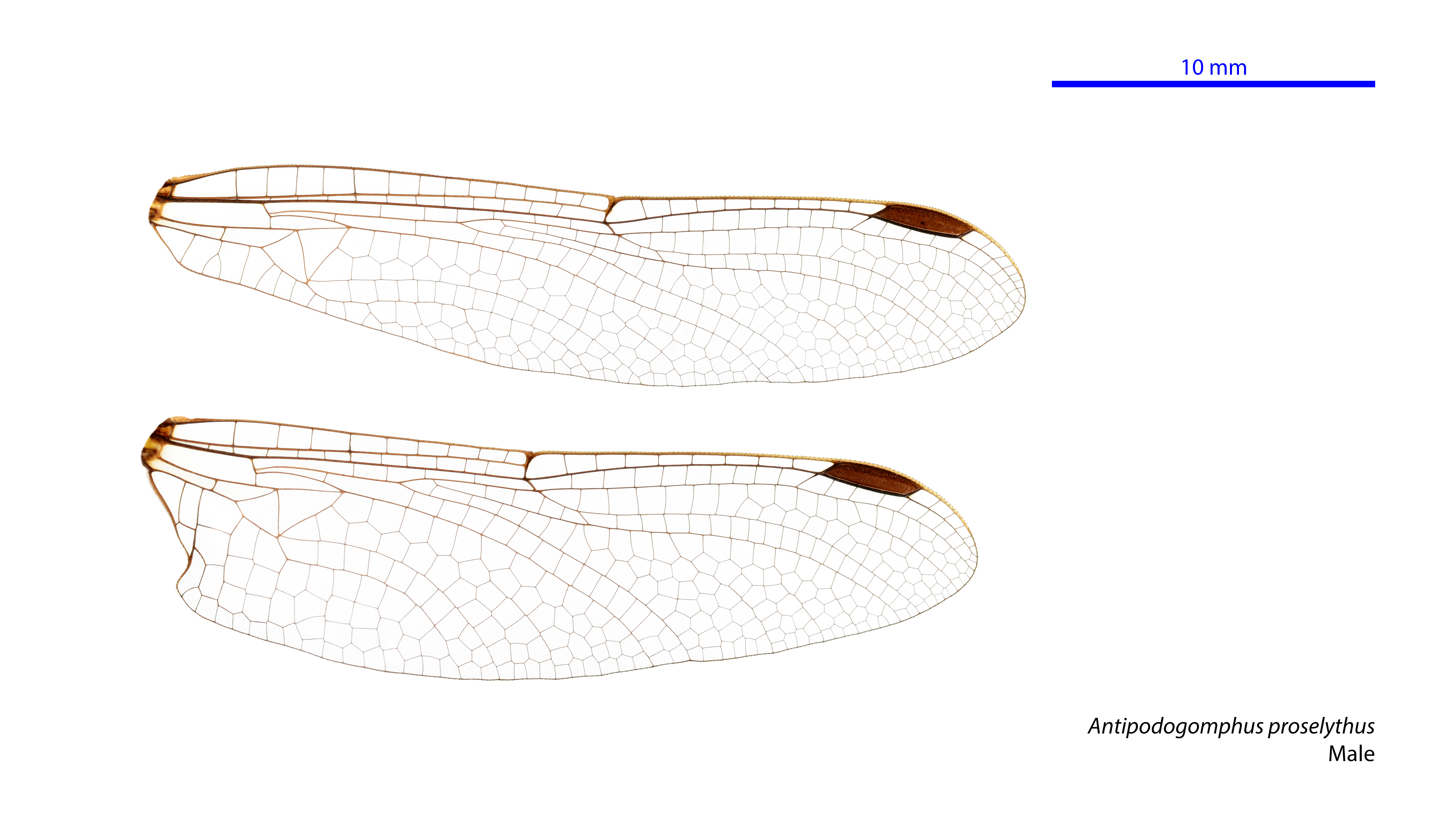
Male wings

== See also ==
- List of Odonata species of Australia
