= Archaeophya magnifica =

Magnificent urfly

Conservation status
- Least Concern (IUCN 3.1)

Scientific classification
- Kingdom: Animalia
- Phylum: Arthropoda
- Clade: Pancrustacea
- Class: Insecta
- Order: Odonata
- Suborder: Anisoptera
- Superfamily: Libelluloidea
- Family: Gomphomacromiidae
- Genus: Archaeophya
- Species: A. magnifica

Binomial name
- Archaeophya magnifica Theischinger & Watson, 1978

Species of dragonfly

Archaeophya magnifica is a species of dragonfly in the family Gomphomacromiidae, known as the magnificent urfly. It is a large, metallic-black dragonfly with yellow markings and clear wings. It is endemic to north-east Queensland, Australia, where it inhabits rainforest streams.

== Etymology ==
The genus name Archaeophya is derived from the Greek ἀρχαῖος (arkhaios, "ancient"), combined with φυή (phyē, "form", "stature" or "growth"). The name refers to archaic features in the wing structure, suggesting affinities with South American dragonflies of the same family.

The species name magnifica is derived from the Latin magnificus ("great" or "splendid"), likely referring to the large size and metallic black colouration with yellow markings.

== Gallery ==
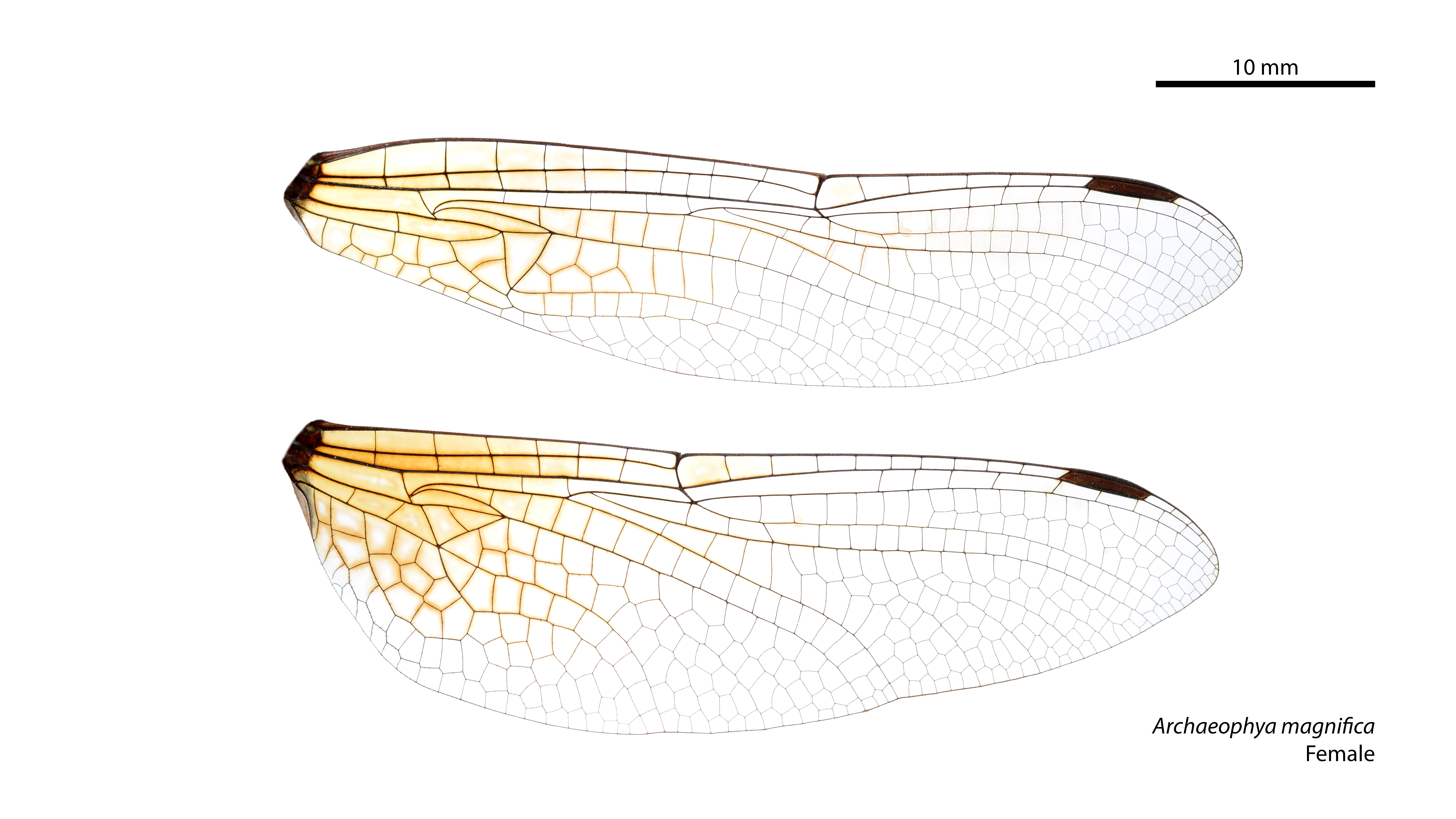
Female wings

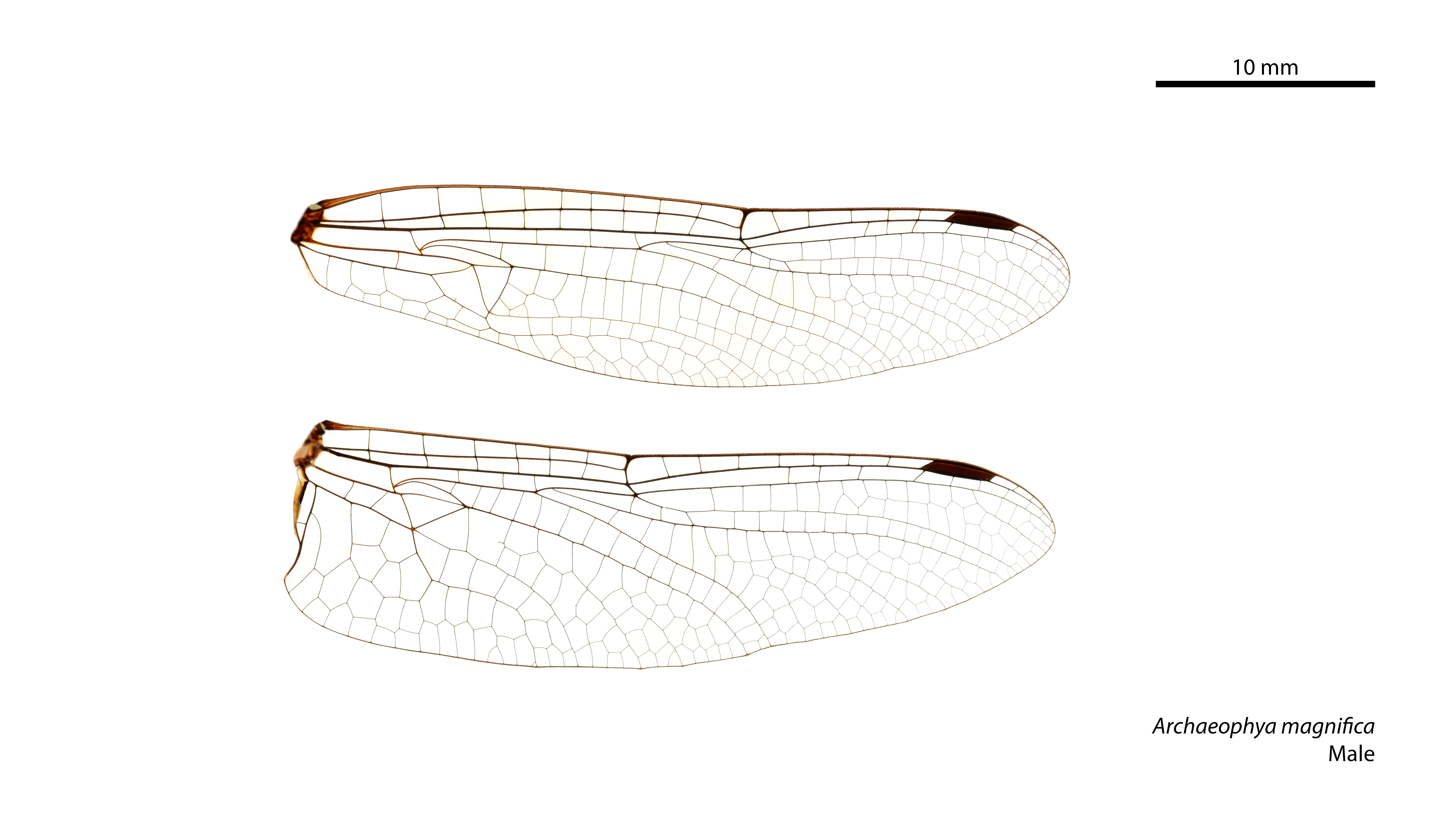
Male wings

== See also ==
- List of Odonata species of Australia
