= Archaeophya adamsi =

Horned urfly

Conservation status
- Vulnerable (IUCN 3.1)

Scientific classification
- Kingdom: Animalia
- Phylum: Arthropoda
- Clade: Pancrustacea
- Class: Insecta
- Order: Odonata
- Suborder: Anisoptera
- Superfamily: Libelluloidea
- Family: Gomphomacromiidae
- Genus: Archaeophya
- Species: A. adamsi

Binomial name
- Archaeophya adamsi Fraser, 1959

Species of dragonfly

Archaeophya adamsi, commonly known as Adam's emerald dragonfly or horned urfly, is a species of dragonfly in the family Gomphomacromiidae. This is an Australian endemic and one of the rarest dragonflies in the country. It breeds in rivers and streams in coastal areas of Queensland and New South Wales.

Nymphs of this species grow to 23 mm in length and live among rocks and detritus along stream margins. They can be identified by the distinctive two-lobed frontal plate on the head. The nymph lives for around 7 years. The adult is a fairly large and robust dragonfly, blackish brown with narrow yellow rings. The adult probably only lives for a few months.

== Etymology ==
The genus name Archaeophya is derived from the Greek ἀρχαῖος (arkhaios, "ancient"), combined with φυή (phyē, "form", "stature" or "growth"). The name refers to archaic features in the wing structure, suggesting affinities with South American dragonflies of the same family.

In 1959, F. C. Fraser named this species adamsi, an eponym honouring the Queensland coleopterist Ernest Adams, who collected the original specimen.

== Gallery ==
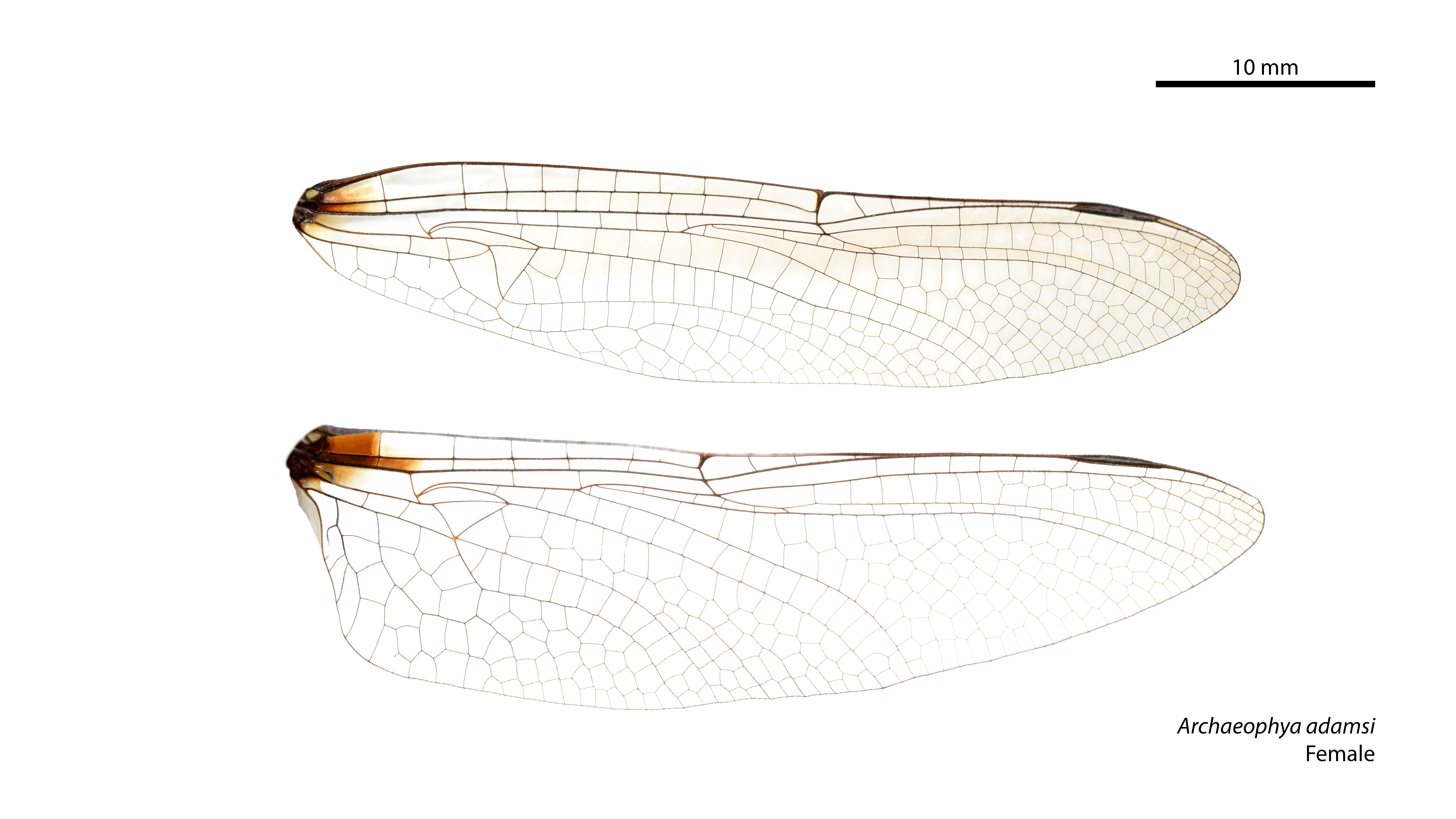
Female wings

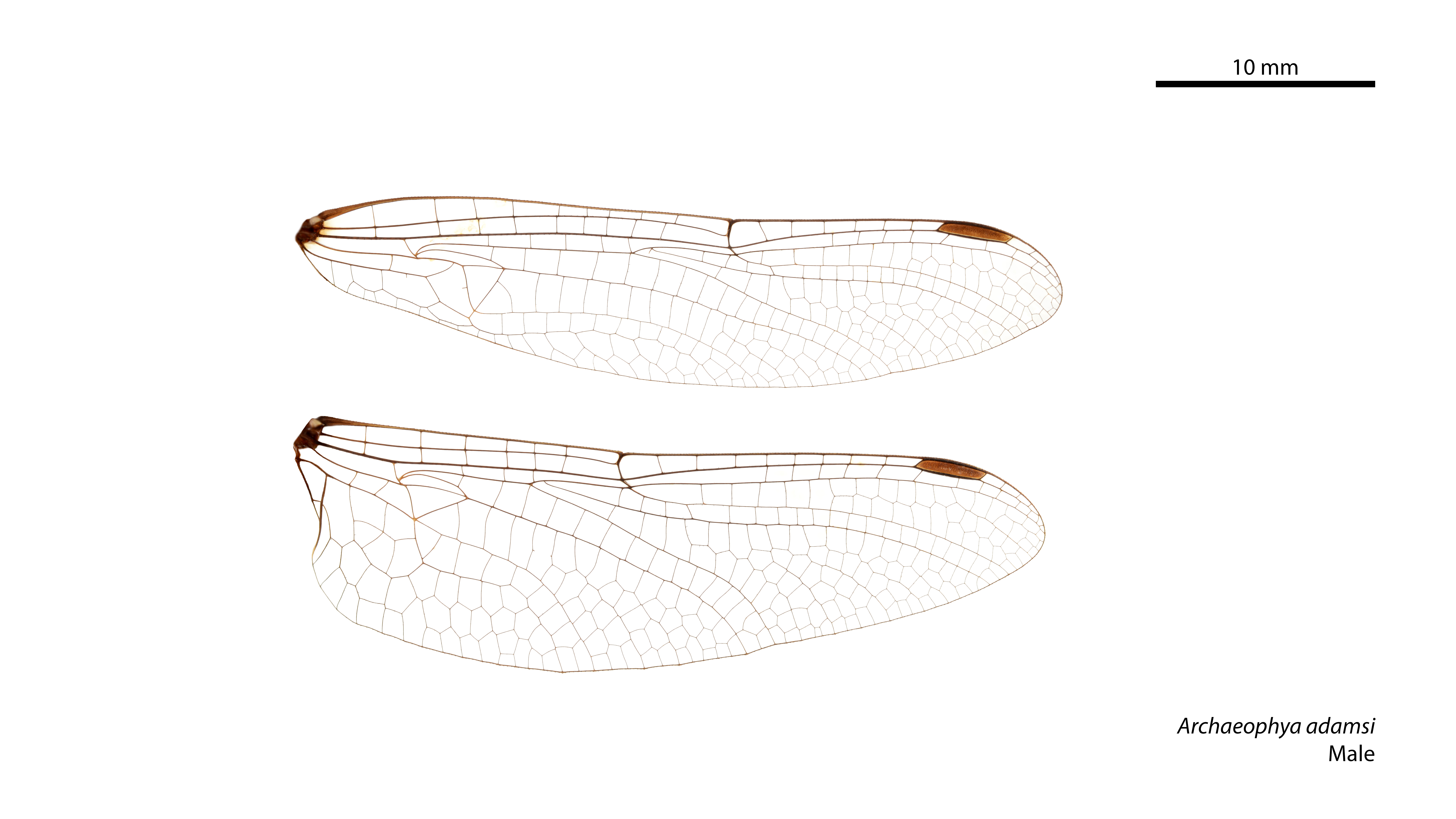
Male wings
