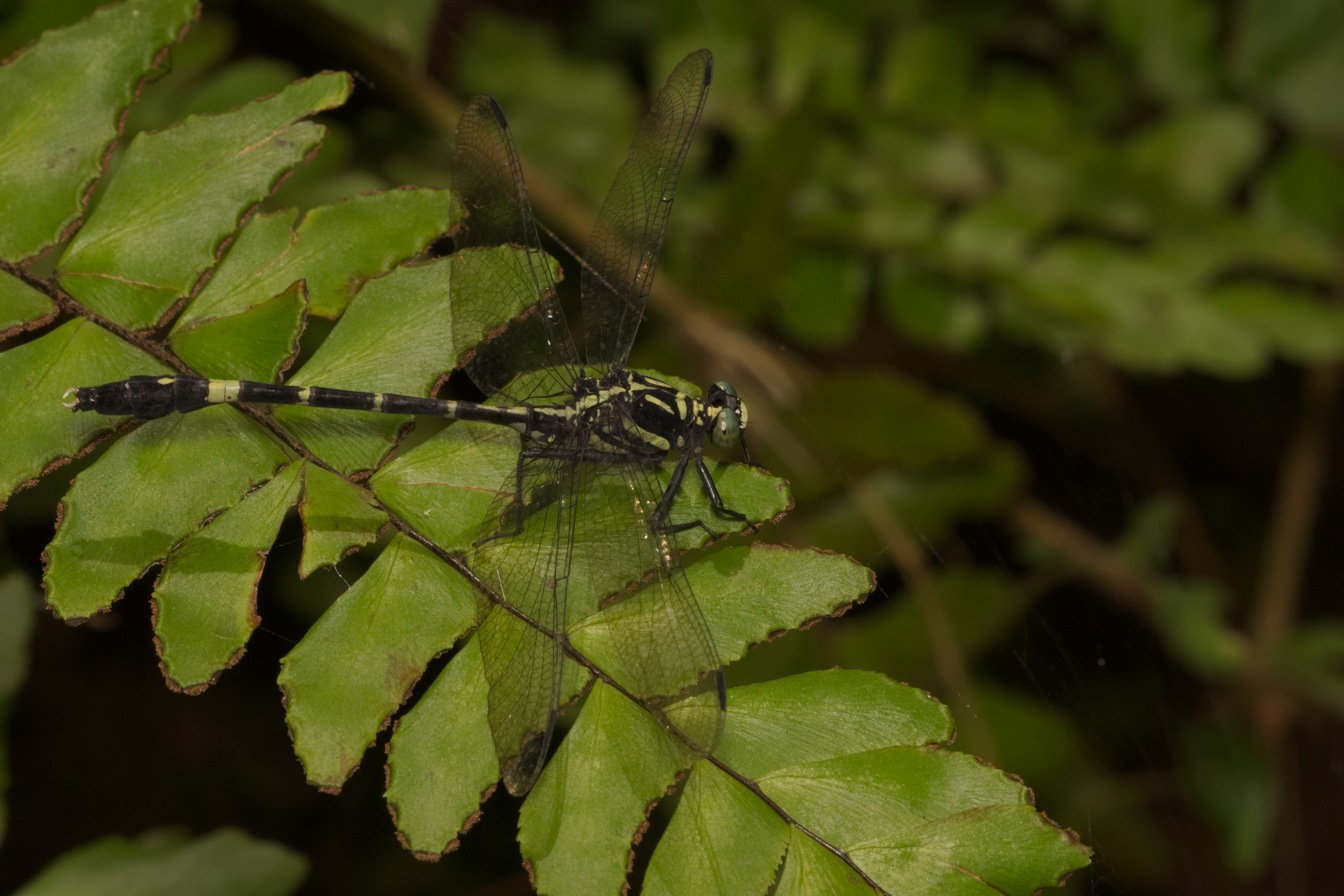
- Merogomphus longistigma

Scientific classification
- Kingdom: Animalia
- Phylum: Arthropoda
- Class: Insecta
- Order: Odonata
- Infraorder: Anisoptera
- Superfamily: Gomphoidea
- Family: Gomphidae
- Genus: Merogomphus; Martin, 1904

= Merogomphus =

Genus of dragonflies

Merogomphus is a genus of dragonflies in the family Gomphidae, erected by René Martin in 1904. Species have been recorded from China, Indochina, western India and Malesia.

== Species ==
The Global Biodiversity Information Facility lists:

1. Merogomphus femoralis Laidlaw, 1931
2. Merogomphus longistigma (Fraser, 1922)
3. Merogomphus pavici Martin, 1904
4. Merogomphus tamaracherriensis Fraser, 1931
5. Merogomphus torpens (Needham, 1930)
6. Merogomphus vandykei Needham, 1930
7. Merogomphus vespertinus Chao, 1999
