= Micromidia rodericki =

Thursday Island mosquitohawk

Conservation status
- Data Deficient (IUCN 3.1)

Scientific classification
- Kingdom: Animalia
- Phylum: Arthropoda
- Clade: Pancrustacea
- Class: Insecta
- Order: Odonata
- Suborder: Anisoptera
- Superfamily: Libelluloidea
- Family: Austrocorduliidae
- Genus: Micromidia
- Species: M. rodericki

Binomial name
- Micromidia rodericki Fraser, 1959
- Distribution on Thursday Island, Torres Strait, Australia

Species of dragonfly

Micromidia rodericki is a species of dragonfly in the family Austrocorduliidae, endemic to Thursday Island in the Torres Strait, Australia, where it inhabits rainforest streams. It is commonly known as the Thursday Island mosquitohawk.

== Taxonomy ==
Micromidia rodericki was originally described by Frederic Charles Fraser in 1959 from material collected on Thursday Island, Queensland. At the time of its description, it was placed in the genus Micromidia. In recent classifications, the species is placed in the family Austrocorduliidae.

== Etymology ==
The genus name Micromidia combines the Greek μικρός (mikros, "small") with an uncertain second element.

In 1959, F. C. Fraser named this species dobsoni, an eponym honouring Roderick Dobson, who collected the original specimen.

== Gallery ==
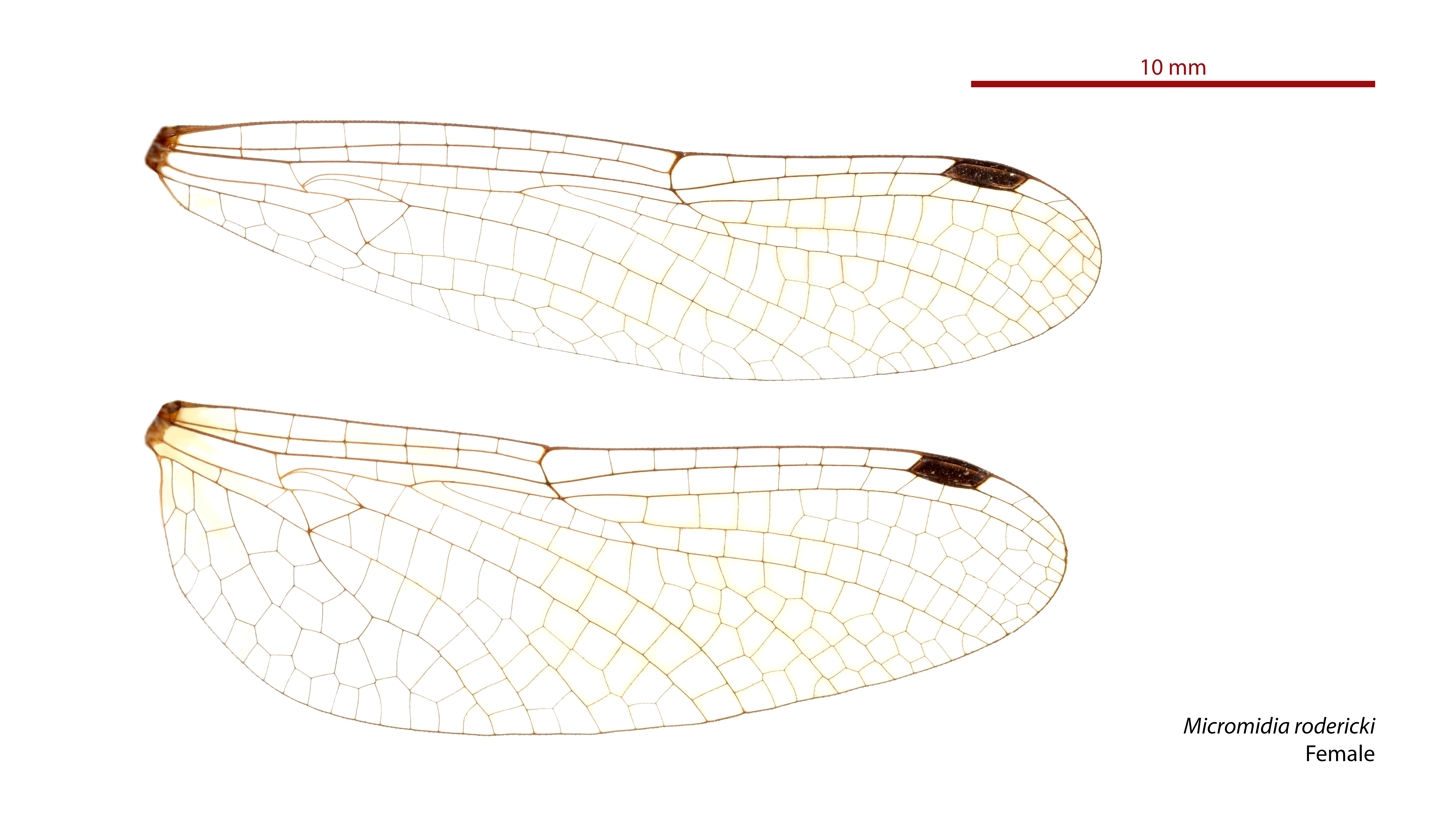
Female wings

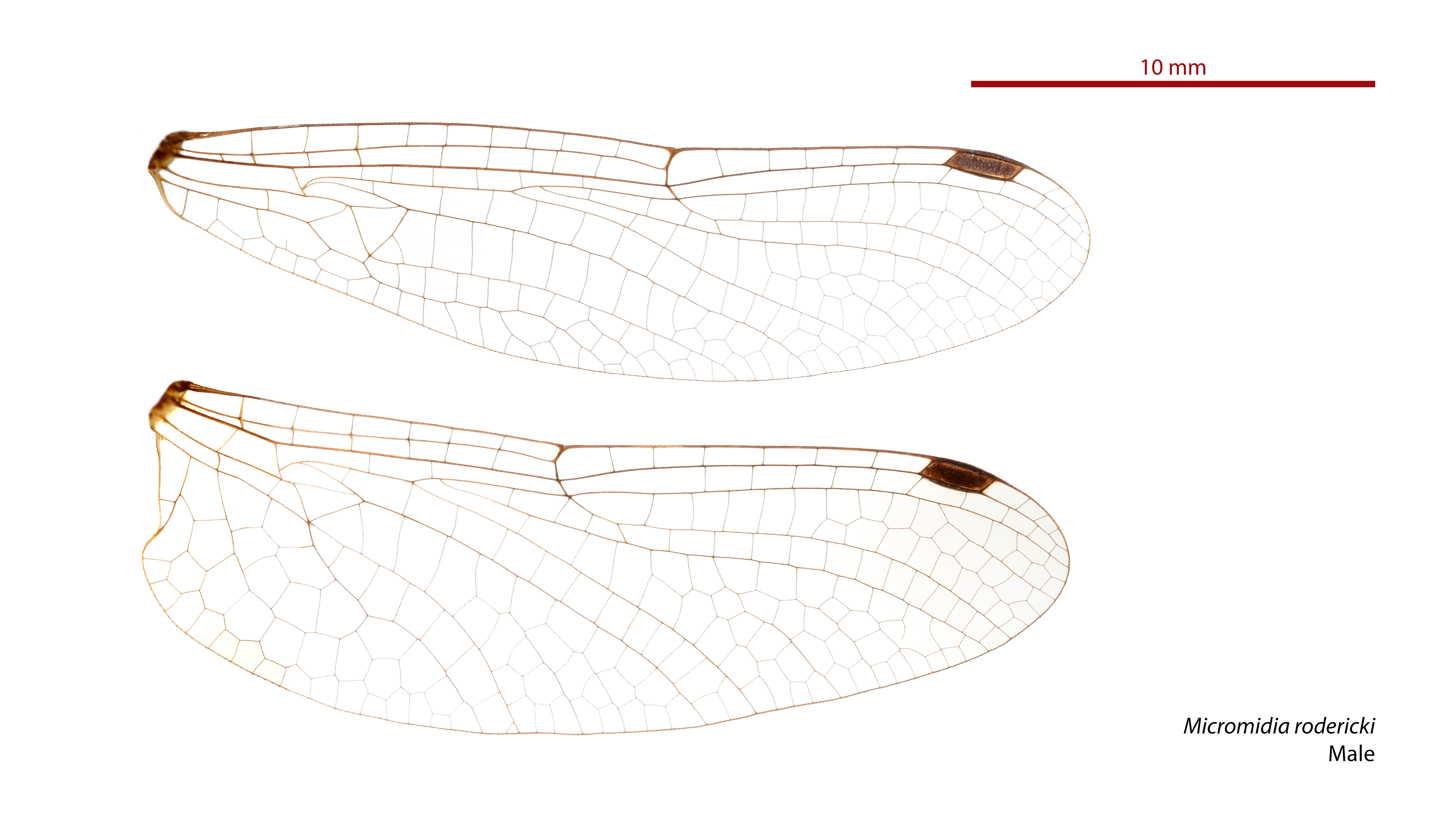
Male wings

== See also ==
- List of Odonata species of Australia
