= Micromidia convergens =

Early mosquitohawk

Conservation status
- Vulnerable (IUCN 3.1)

Scientific classification
- Kingdom: Animalia
- Phylum: Arthropoda
- Clade: Pancrustacea
- Class: Insecta
- Order: Odonata
- Suborder: Anisoptera
- Superfamily: Libelluloidea
- Family: Austrocorduliidae
- Genus: Micromidia
- Species: M. convergens

Binomial name
- Micromidia convergens Theischinger & Watson, 1978
- Distribution in eastern Australia

Species of dragonfly

Micromidia convergens is a species of dragonfly in the family Austrocorduliidae, endemic to eastern Australia, and commonly known as the early mosquitohawk.

It is a small to medium-sized dragonfly, black to metallic green in colour, with pale markings on its abdomen. It inhabits rainforest streams.

== Taxonomy ==
Micromidia convergens was described by Günther Theischinger and Tony Watson in 1978. At the time of its description, it was placed in the genus Micromidia. Recent classifications place the species in the family Austrocorduliidae.

== Etymology ==
The genus name Micromidia combines the Greek μικρός (mikros, "small") with an uncertain second element.

The species name convergens is Latin for "converging", referring to the shape of the appendages.

== Gallery ==
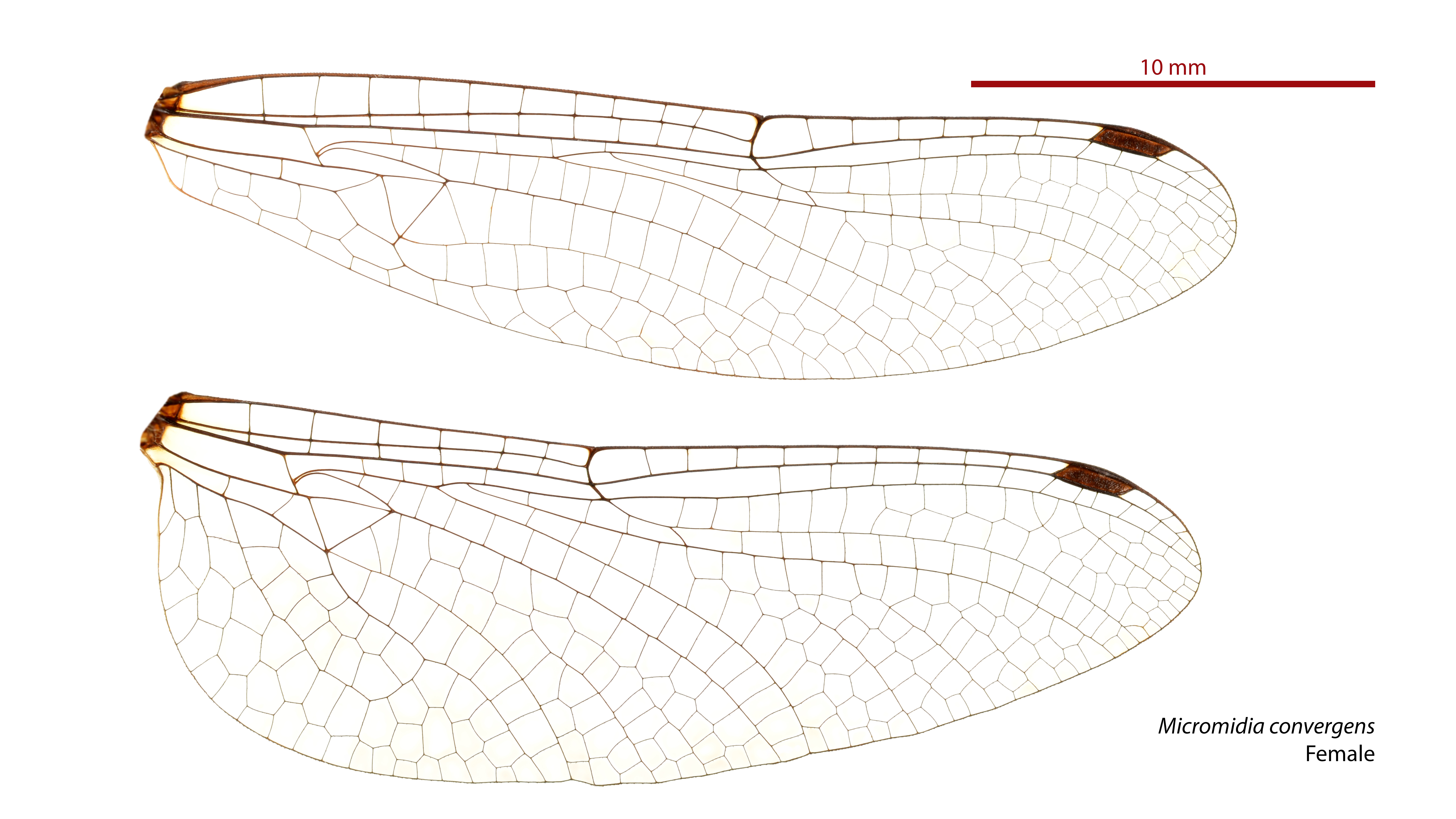
Female wings

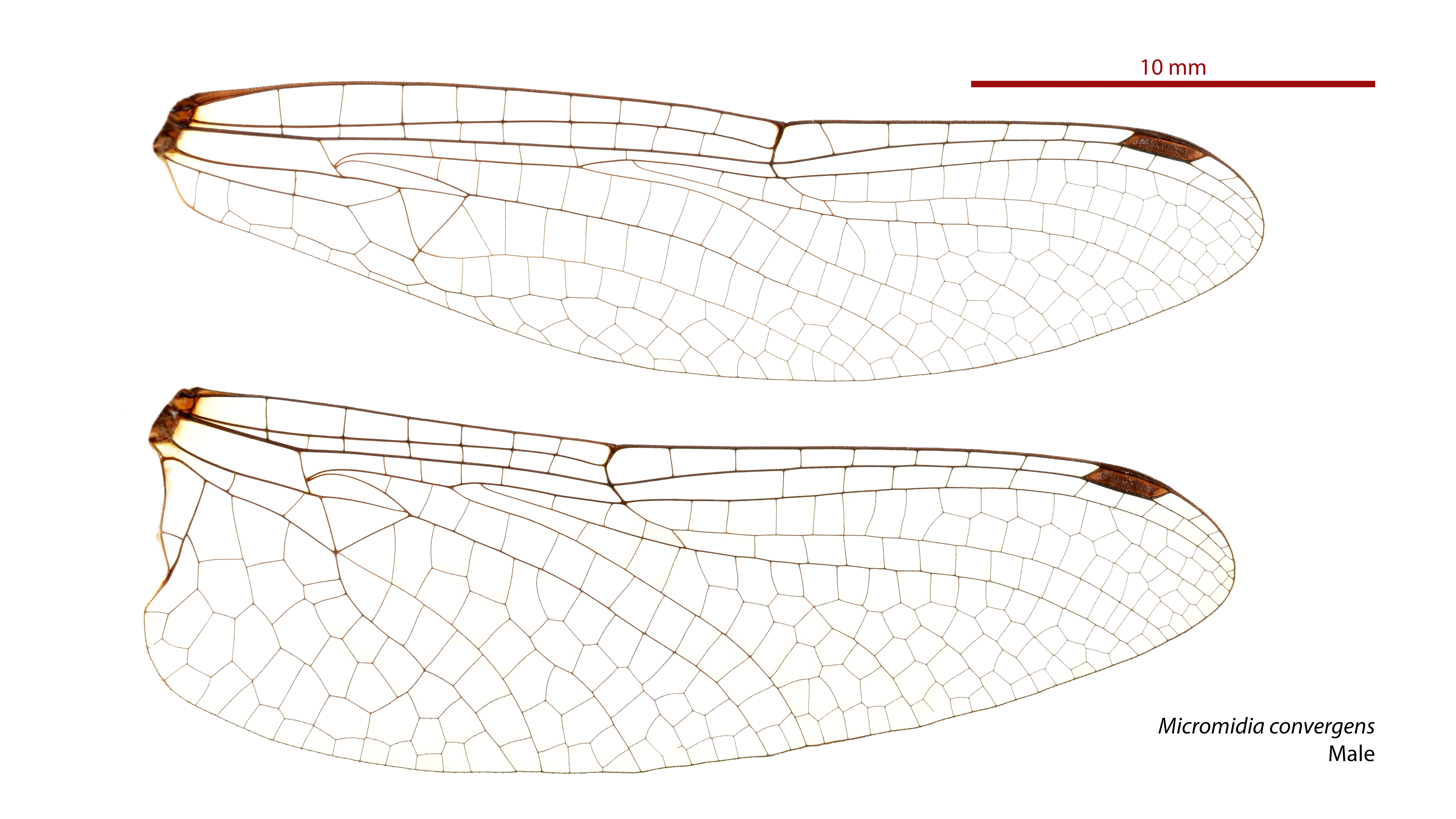
Male wings

== See also ==
- List of Odonata species of Australia
