= Micromidia =

Scientific classification
- Kingdom: Animalia
- Phylum: Arthropoda
- Clade: Pancrustacea
- Class: Insecta
- Order: Odonata
- Suborder: Anisoptera
- Superfamily: Libelluloidea
- Family: Austrocorduliidae
- Genus: Micromidia; Fraser, 1959
- Distribution in eastern Australia

Genus of dragonflies

Micromidia is a genus of dragonflies in the family Austrocorduliidae. They are small to medium-sized dragonflies, coloured black or metallic green with pale markings, and are endemic to eastern Australia.

== Species list ==
The genus Micromidia includes the following species:

- Micromidia atrifrons (McLachlan, 1883) – forest mosquitohawk
- Micromidia convergens Theischinger & Watson, 1978 – early mosquitohawk
- Micromidia rodericki Fraser, 1959 – Thursday Island mosquitohawk

== Taxonomy ==
The genus Micromidia was described by Fraser in 1959. Its familial placement was later uncertain, and it was treated as unassigned within the superfamily Libelluloidea in some classifications. Earlier authors placed the genus in several different families, including Austrocorduliidae, Synthemistidae and Corduliidae. More recent classifications place Micromidia in the family Austrocorduliidae.

== Etymology ==
The genus name Micromidia combines the Greek μικρός (mikros, "small") with an uncertain second element.

== See also ==
- List of Odonata species of Australia
