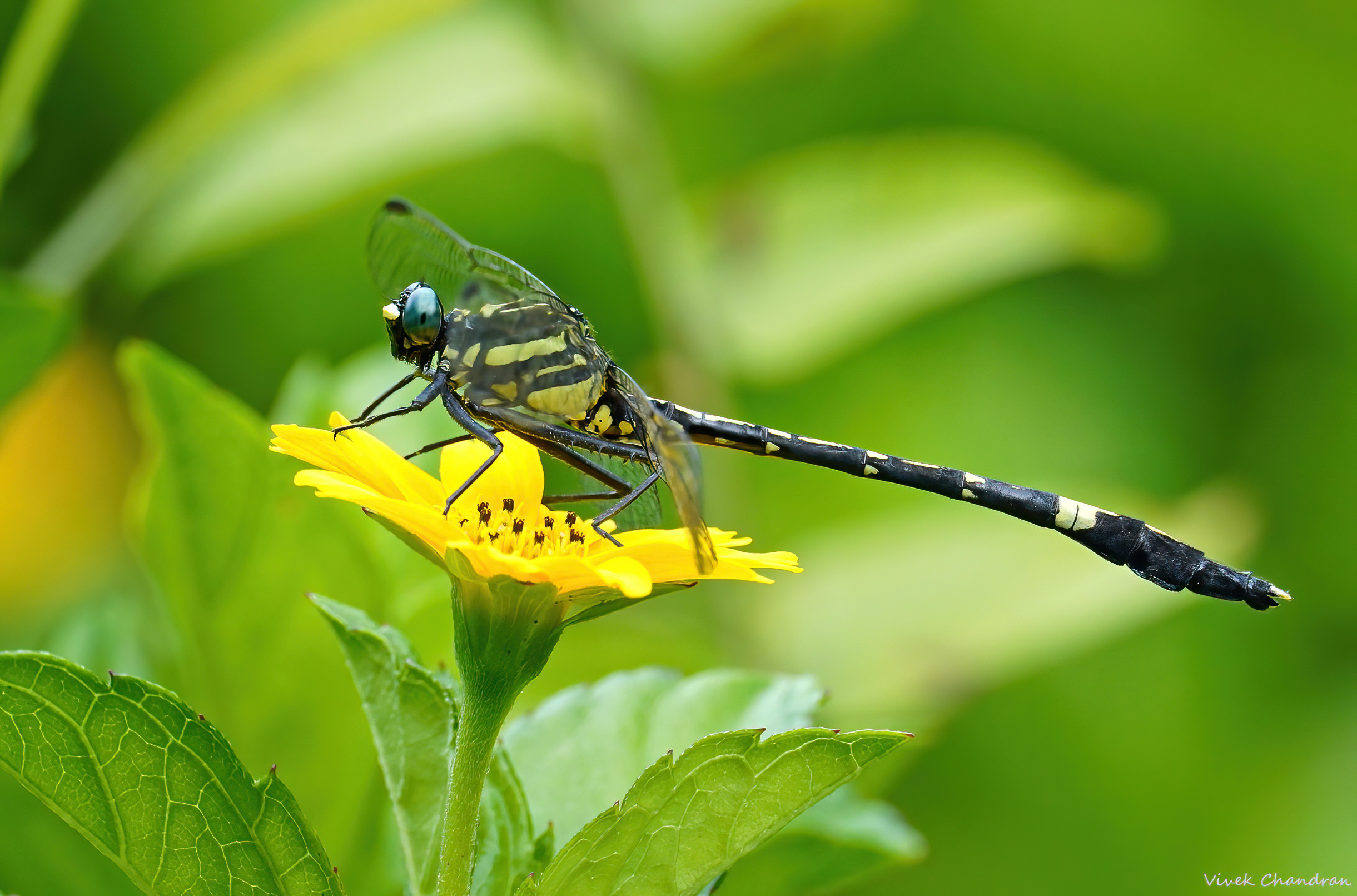
- Male
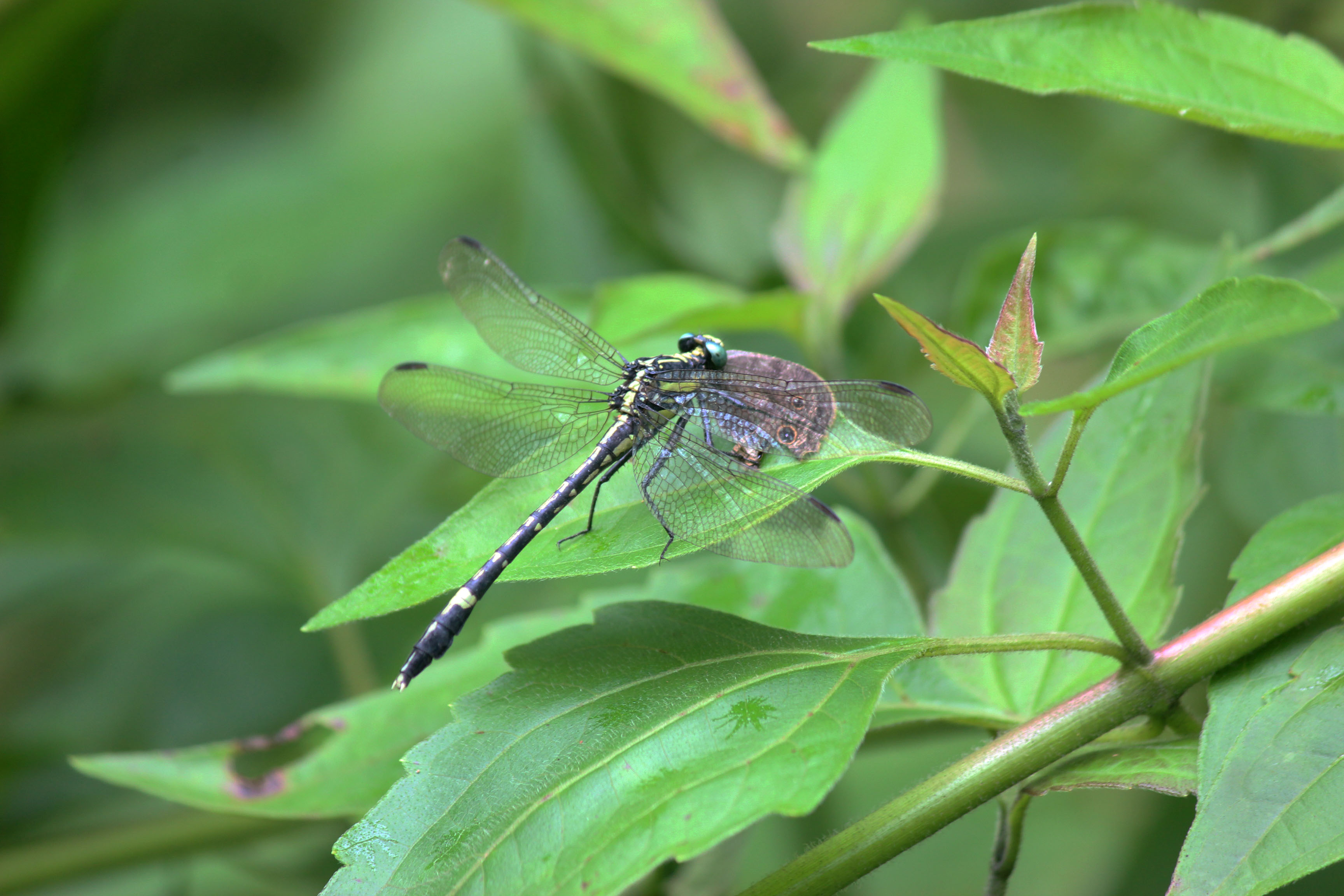
- Female

Conservation status
- Data Deficient (IUCN 3.1)

Scientific classification
- Kingdom: Animalia
- Phylum: Arthropoda
- Class: Insecta
- Order: Odonata
- Infraorder: Anisoptera
- Family: Gomphidae
- Genus: Merogomphus
- Species: M. longistigma

Binomial name
- Merogomphus longistigma (Fraser, 1922)

Synonyms
- Indogomphus longistigma Fraser, 1922

= Merogomphus longistigma =

Species of dragonfly

Merogomphus longistigma is a species of large dragonfly in the family Gomphidae. It is endemic to the forest streams of Western Ghats of India.

== Description and habitat ==
It is a large dragonfly with bottle-green eyes. Its thorax is black, marked with bright yellow. Sides are greenish-yellow traversed by two closely parallel black stripes. Abdomen is black, marked with bright yellow. Segment 1 has a broad stripe on dorsum and a large quadrate spot on each side. Segment 2 has an L-shaped spot on each side. Segment 3 has a baso-lateral triangular spot, a latero-ventral stripe tapering from the basal end and a narrow mid-dorsal stripe. Segments 4 to 6 have similar markings, but the lateral stripe is absent and the mid-dorsal stripe is well separated from the basal yellow. Segment 7 has its basal half broadly yellow. Segments 8 t o 10 have only the mid-dorsal carina finely yellow.

It looks similar to Merogomphus tamaracherriensis; but can be differentiated by the colour of the occiput and abdominal markings, as well as by its smaller size. The occiput greenish yellow here whereas entirely black in M. tamaracherriensis. The anal appendages also differ rather widely from those of M. tamaracherriensis. The anal appendages of M. longistigma are decidedly depressed for the distal half and the apices turn sharply upwards. In M. tamaracherriensis, the base slopes sharply away on the inner side so that the fenestra is diamond-shaped.

It is commonly found in montane streams at high altitudes.

== See also ==
- List of odonates of India
- List of odonata of Kerala
