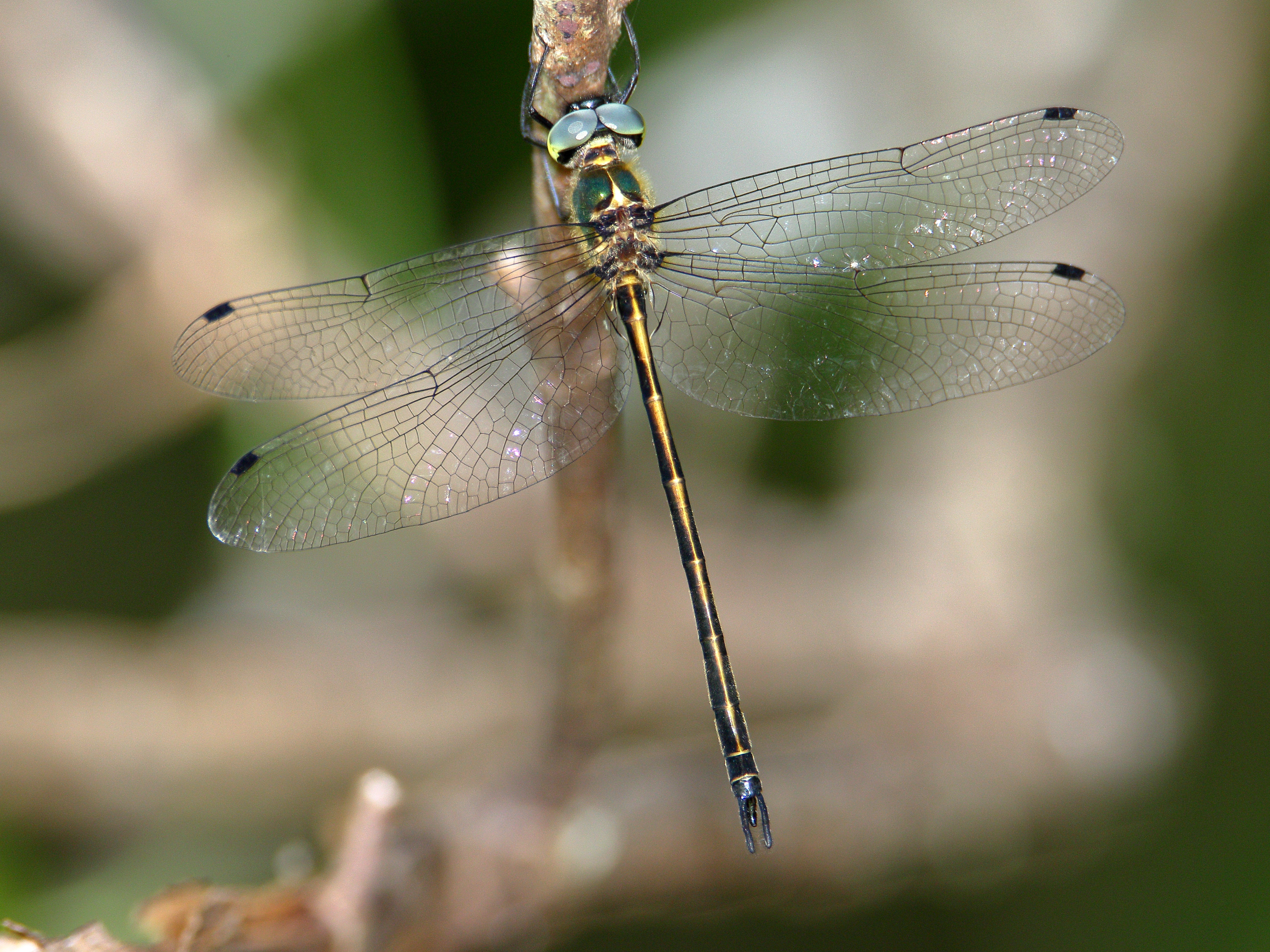
- Male, Cairns, Australia
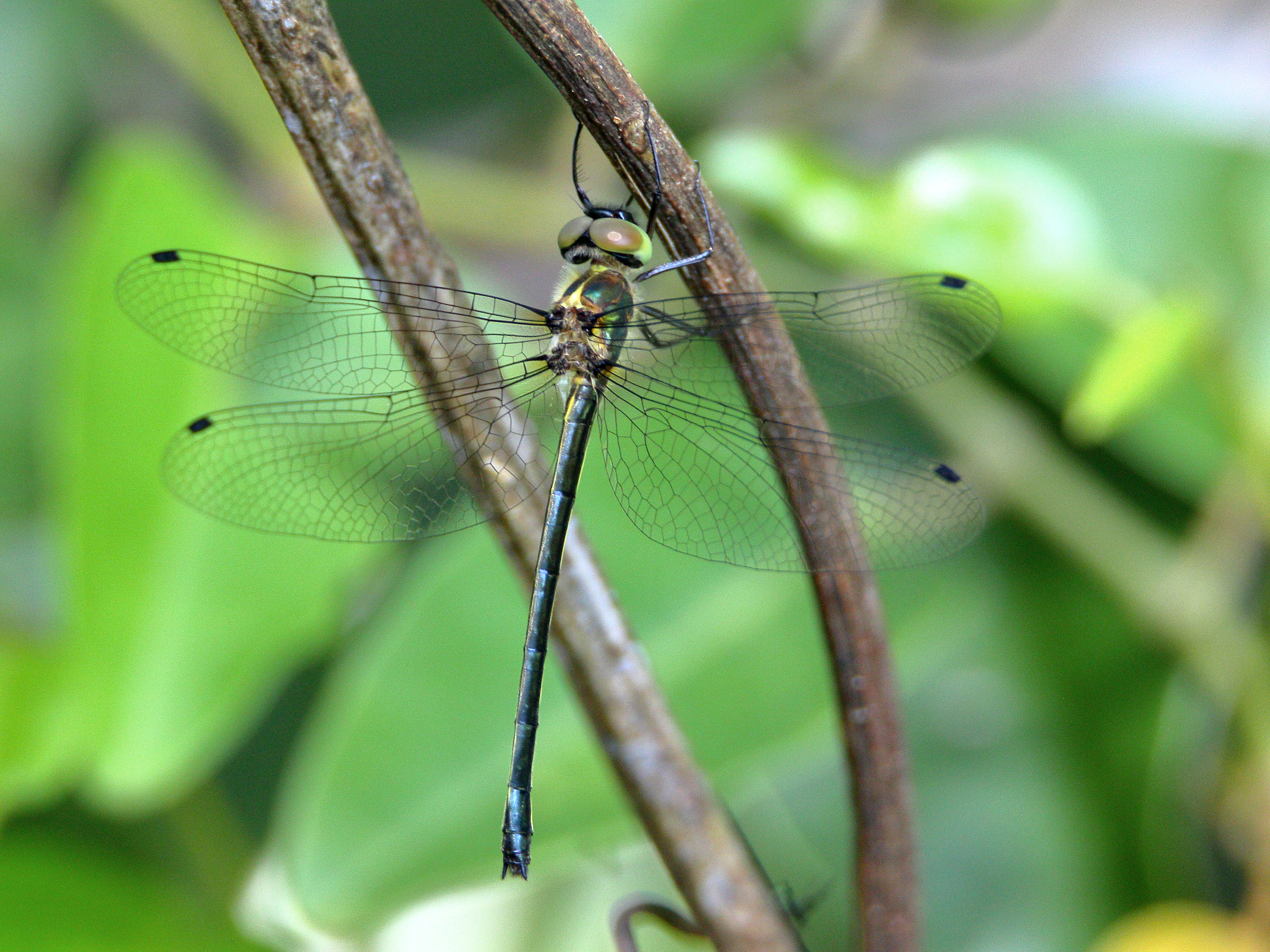
- Female

Conservation status
- Least Concern (IUCN 3.1)

Scientific classification
- Kingdom: Animalia
- Phylum: Arthropoda
- Clade: Pancrustacea
- Class: Insecta
- Order: Odonata
- Suborder: Anisoptera
- Superfamily: Libelluloidea
- Family: Austrocorduliidae
- Genus: Micromidia
- Species: M. atrifrons

Binomial name
- Micromidia atrifrons (McLachlan, 1883)
- Distribution in north-eastern Australia

Synonyms
- Syncordulia atrifrons McLachlan, 1883

= Micromidia atrifrons =

Forest mosquitohawk

Species of dragonfly

Micromidia atrifrons is a species of dragonfly in the family Austrocorduliidae, endemic to north-eastern Australia, where it inhabits streams. It is commonly known as the forest mosquitohawk. It is a small to medium-sized dragonfly, black to metallic green in colour, with pale markings on its abdomen.

== Taxonomy ==
Micromidia atrifrons was originally described by Robert McLachlan in 1883. At the time of its description, it was placed in the genus Micromidia. More recent classifications place the species in the family Austrocorduliidae.

== Etymology ==
The genus name Micromidia combines the Greek μικρός (mikros, "small") with an uncertain second element.

The species name atrifrons is derived from the Latin ater ("black") and frons ("forehead" or "brow"), referring to the shining greenish-black face.

== Gallery ==
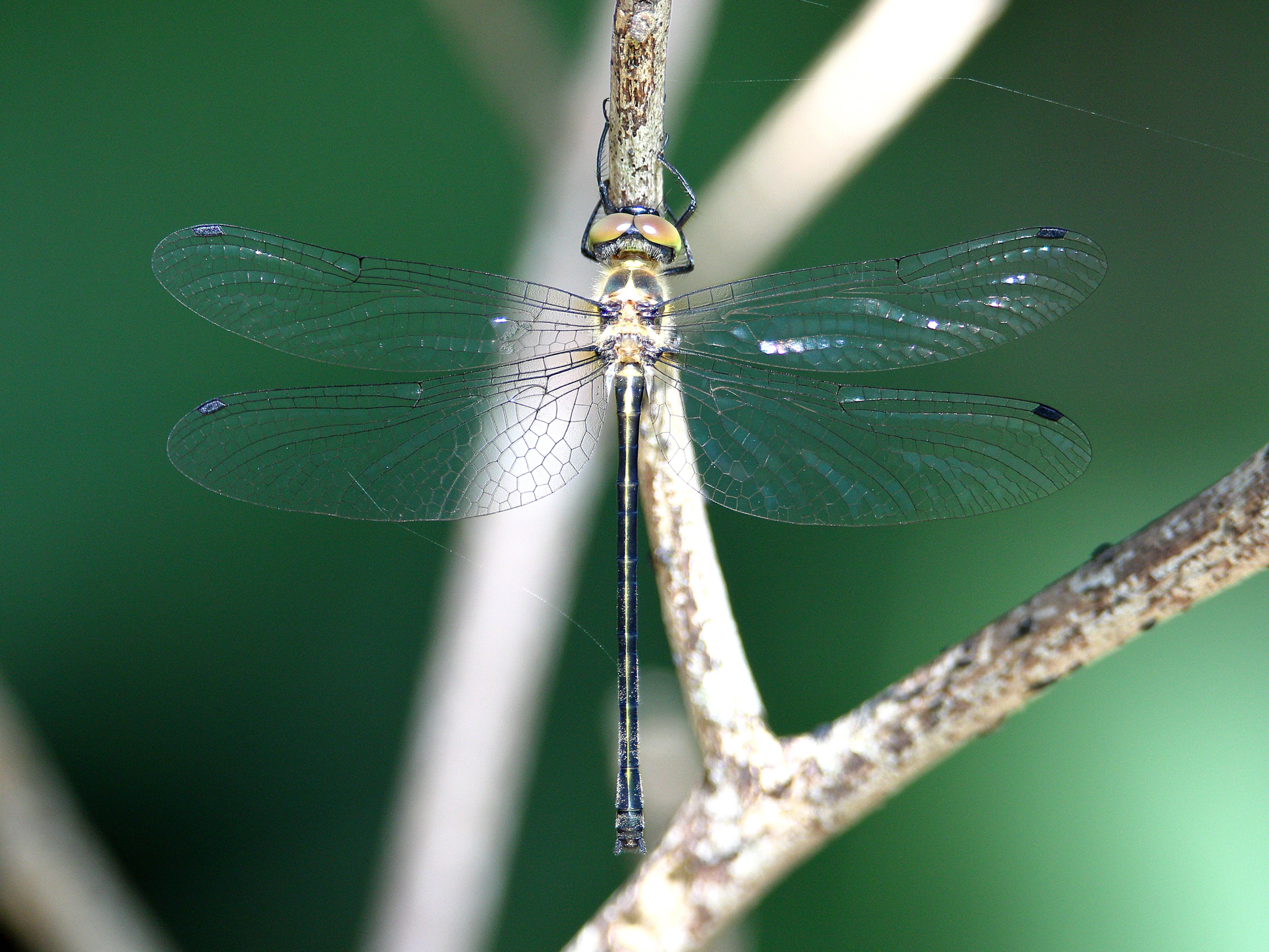
Female dorsal view

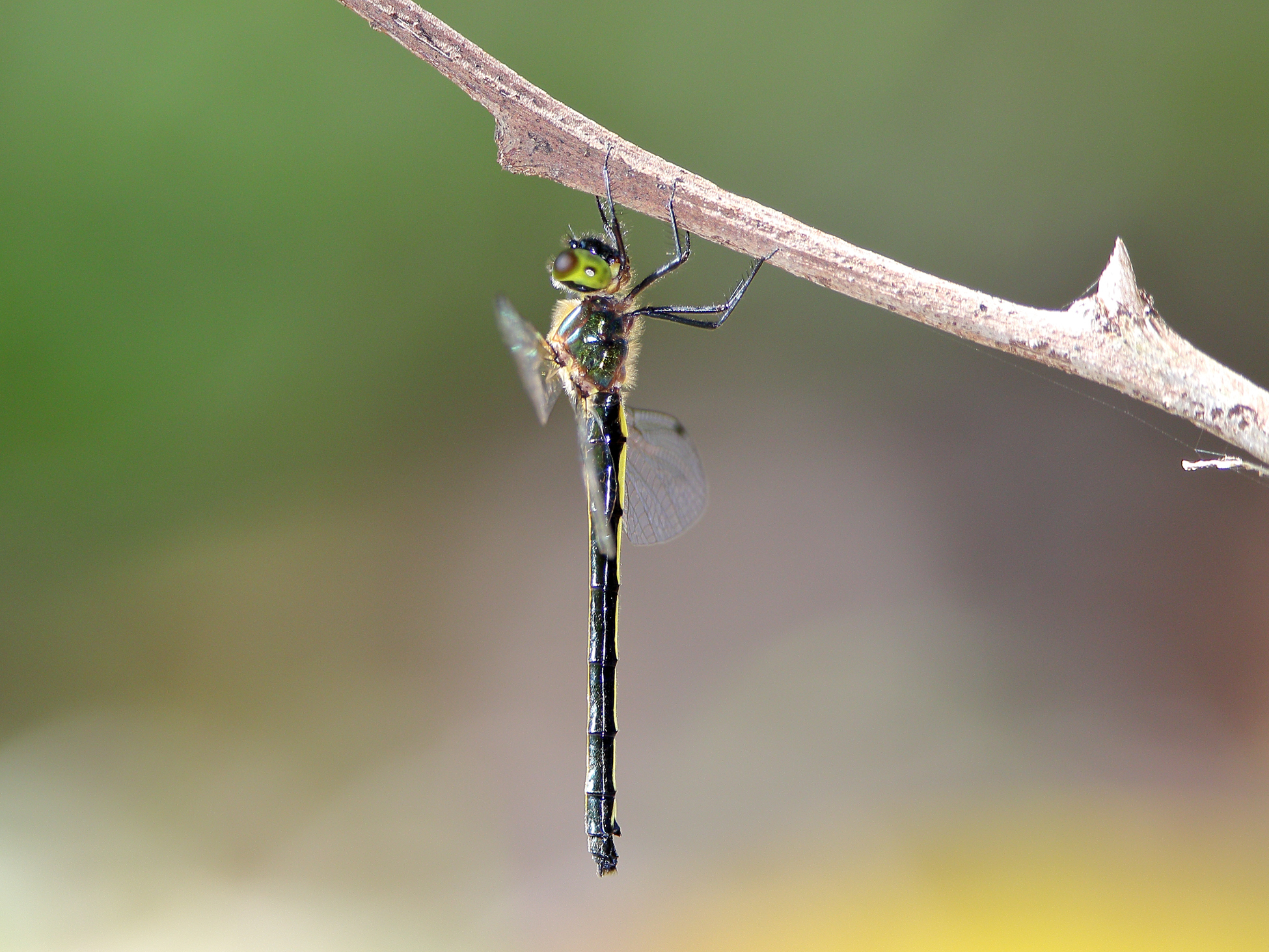
Female lateral view

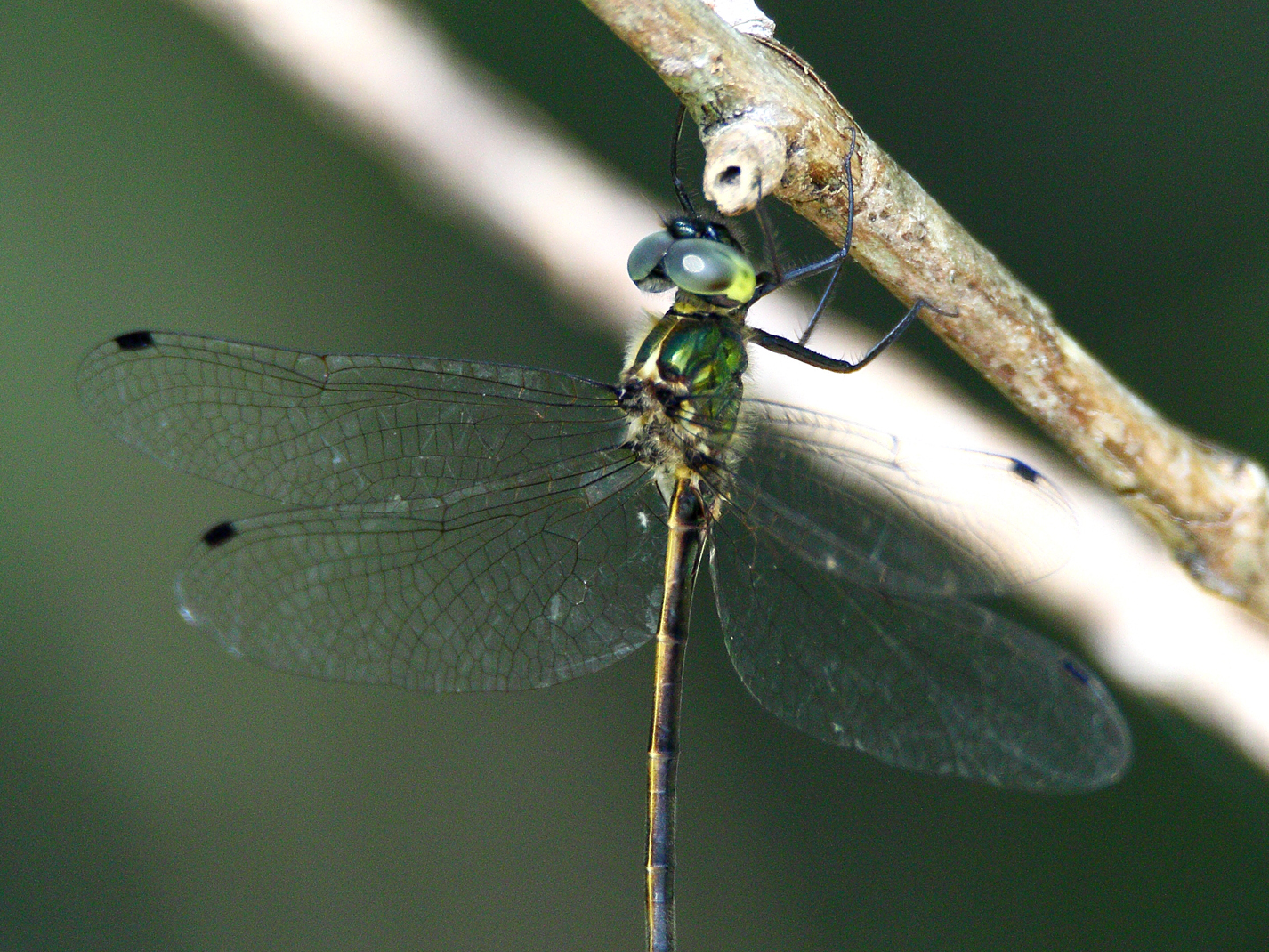
Female detail

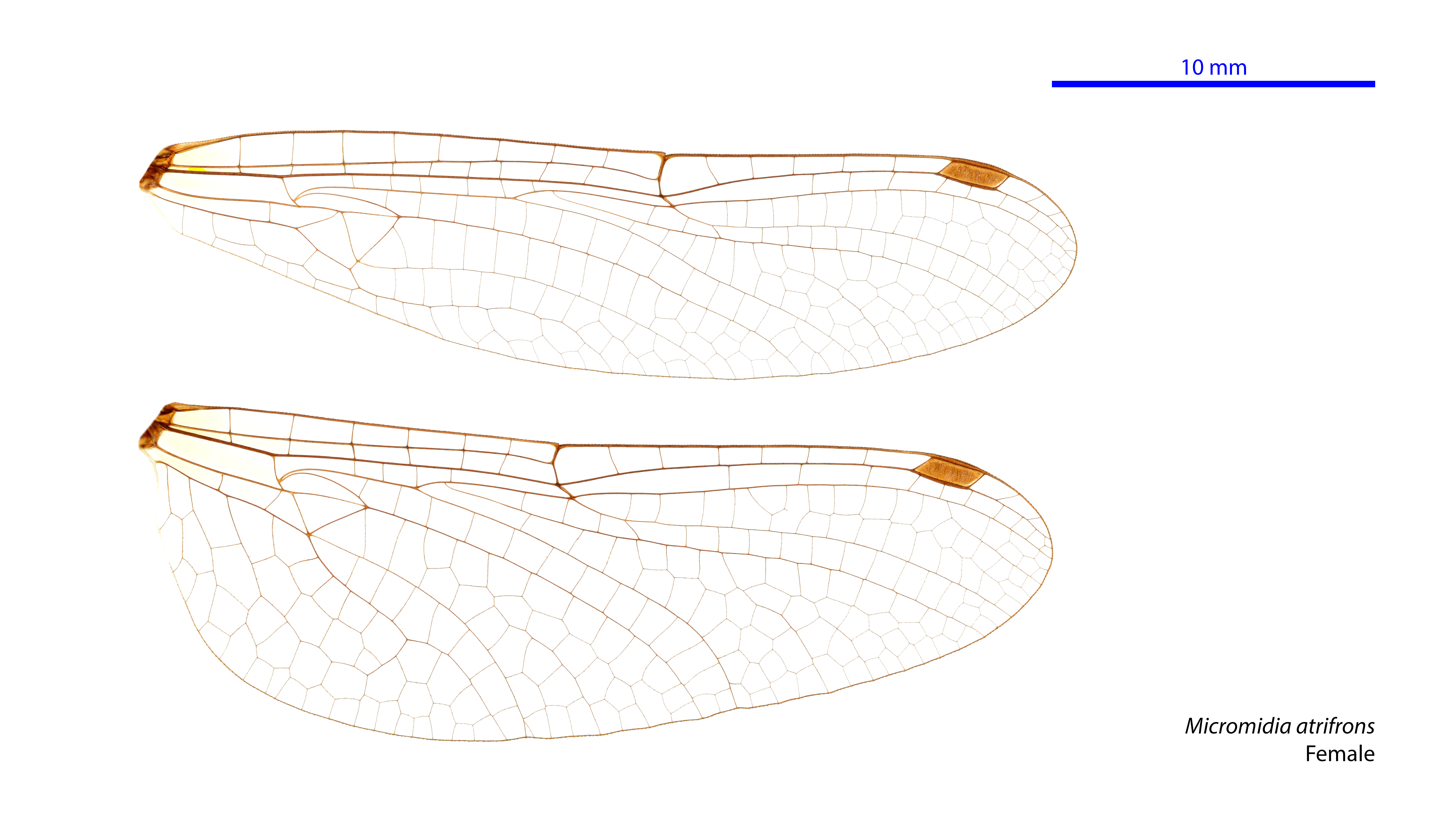
Female wings

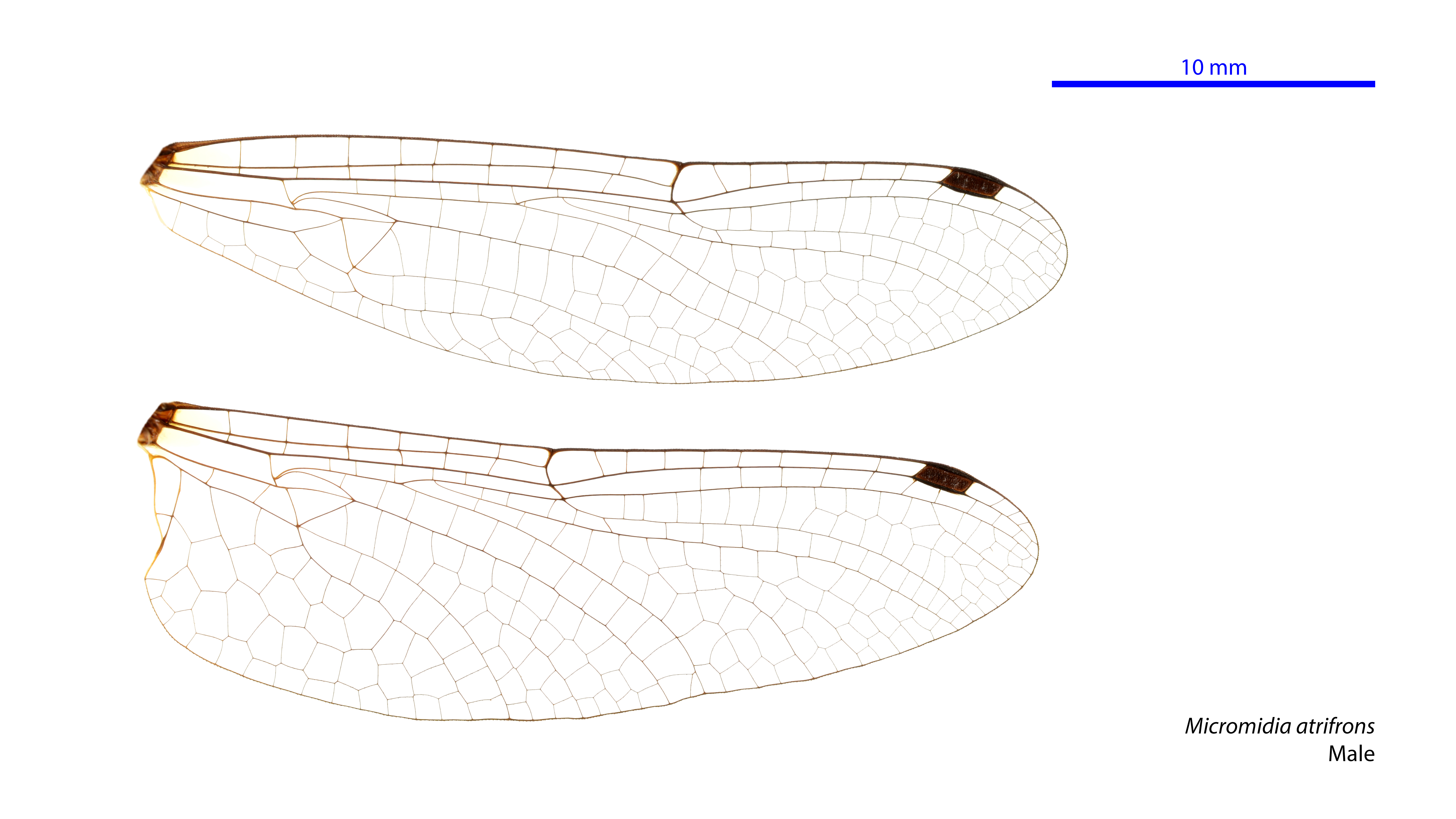
Male wings

== See also ==
- List of Odonata species of Australia
