= Archaeophya =

Scientific classification
- Kingdom: Animalia
- Phylum: Arthropoda
- Clade: Pancrustacea
- Class: Insecta
- Order: Odonata
- Suborder: Anisoptera
- Superfamily: Libelluloidea
- Family: Gomphomacromiidae
- Genus: Archaeophya; Fraser, 1959

Genus of dragonflies

Archaeophya is a small genus of dragonflies within the family Gomphomacromiidae. Species of Archaeophya are large dragonflies with metallic-coloured bodies, dark with yellow spots, and clear wings. They occur along streams in eastern Australia.

== Species ==
The genus contains the following two species:

- Archaeophya adamsi Fraser, 1959 – horned urfly
- Archaeophya magnifica Theischinger & Watson, 1978 – magnificent urfly

== Taxonomic history ==
Archaeophya has had a complicated taxonomic history. Although it has long been considered part of the superfamily Libelluloidea, the exact placement of Archaeophya was uncertain for many years, and it was often treated as incertae sedis by different authors.

Molecular and morphological studies published in 2025 helped to clarify this situation. These studies showed that Archaeophya, known from Australia, as well as the genus Gomphomacromia, known from Chile, are closely related and form a distinct group within Libelluloidea, supporting their placement together in the family Gomphomacromiidae.

This arrangement, including both genera in Gomphomacromiidae, is followed by the World Odonata List (2025).

== Etymology ==
The genus name Archaeophya is derived from the Greek ἀρχαῖος (arkhaios, "ancient"), combined with φυή (phyē, "form", "stature" or "growth"). The name refers to archaic features in the wing structure, suggesting affinities with South American dragonflies of the same family.

== See also ==
- List of Odonata species of Australia
