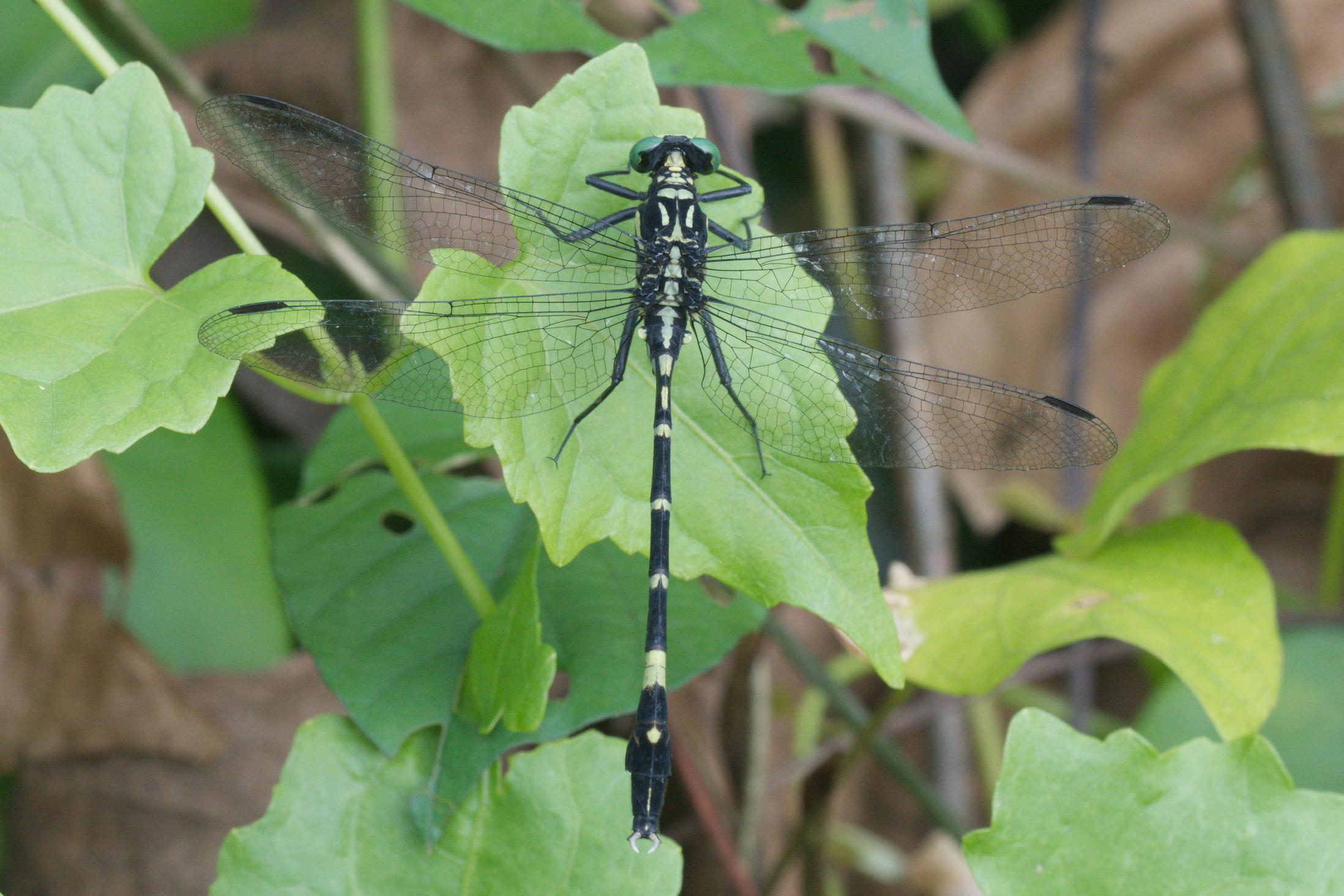
- Male

Scientific classification
- Kingdom: Animalia
- Phylum: Arthropoda
- Class: Insecta
- Order: Odonata
- Infraorder: Anisoptera
- Family: Gomphidae
- Genus: Merogomphus
- Species: M. tamaracherriensis

Binomial name
- Merogomphus tamaracherriensis Fraser, 1931

Synonyms
- Merogomphus longistigma tamaracherriensis Fraser, 1931

= Merogomphus tamaracherriensis =

Species of dragonfly

Merogomphus tamaracherriensis is a species of large dragonfly in the family Gomphidae. It is endemic to the forest streams of Western Ghats of India.

== Description and habitat ==
It is a large dragonfly with bottle-green eyes. Its thorax is black, marked with bright yellow. Sides are greenish-yellow traversed by two closely parallel black stripes. Abdomen is black, marked with bright yellow.

Fraser described this dragonfly as a race or subspecies of Merogomphus longistigma in 1931. He differentiated it from M. longistigma longistigma by the colour of the occiput and abdominal markings, as well as by its smaller size. The occiput entirely black here whereas greenish yellow in M. longistigrna longistigma. The mid-dorsal spot on segment 3 is isolated, and entirely absent on segments 4 to 6. There is a narrow mid-dorsal stripe in segment 3 to 6 in M. longistigrna longistigma.

There is a mid-dorsal tiny diamond-shaped spot on the base of Segment 8. Segments 9 and 10 usually unmarked; but sometimes marked with a fine mid-dorsal streak on 9 and a tiny mid-dorsal apical point of yellow on 10.

As advised by D. E. Kimmins, Fraser revised this species in 1953. He figured out that the anal appendages differ rather widely from those of M. longistigma. The anal appendages of M. longistigma are decidedly depressed for the distal half and the apices turn sharply upwards. In M. tamaracherriensis, the base slopes sharply away on the inner side so that the fenestra is diamond-shaped.

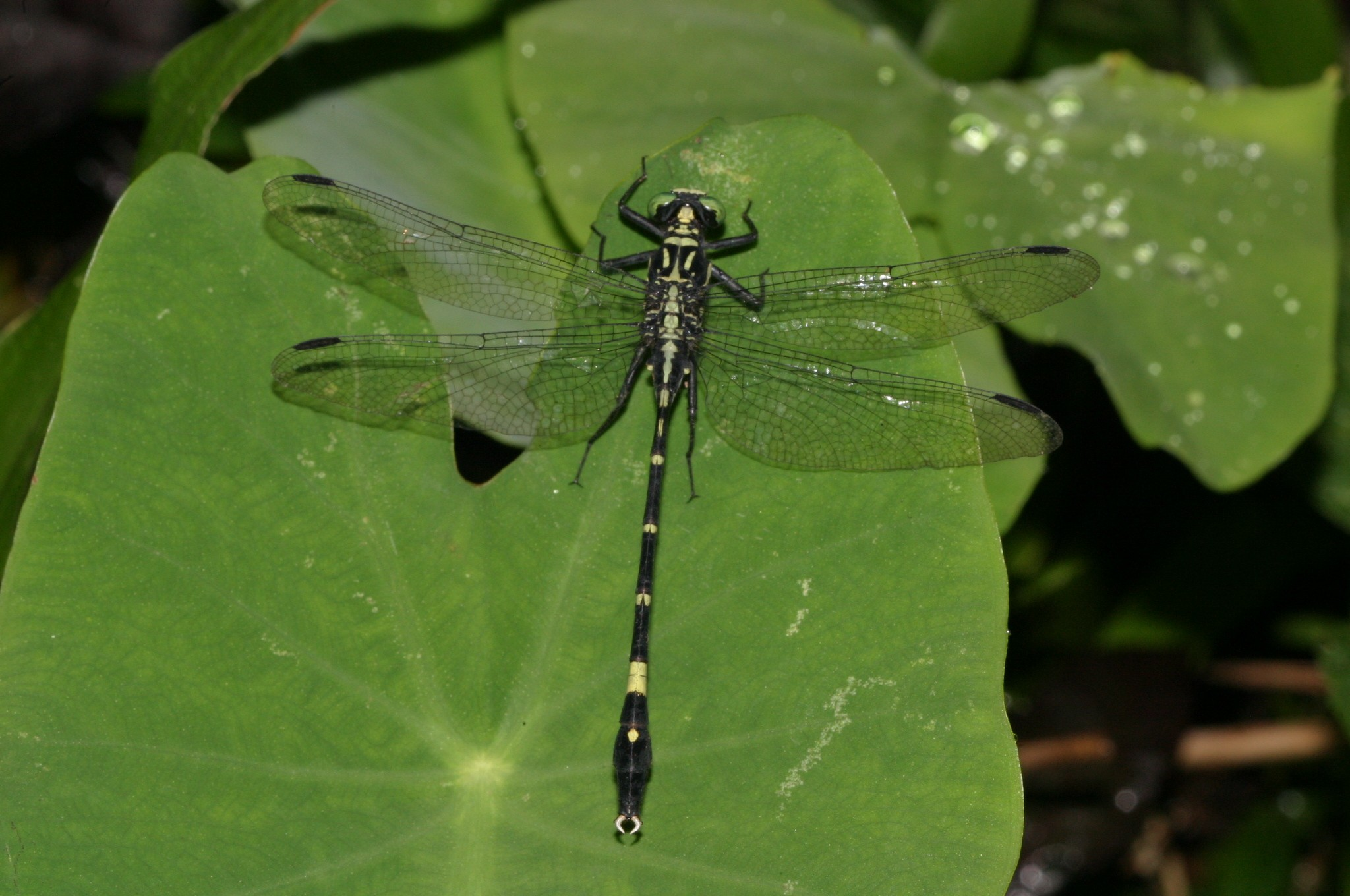
Male

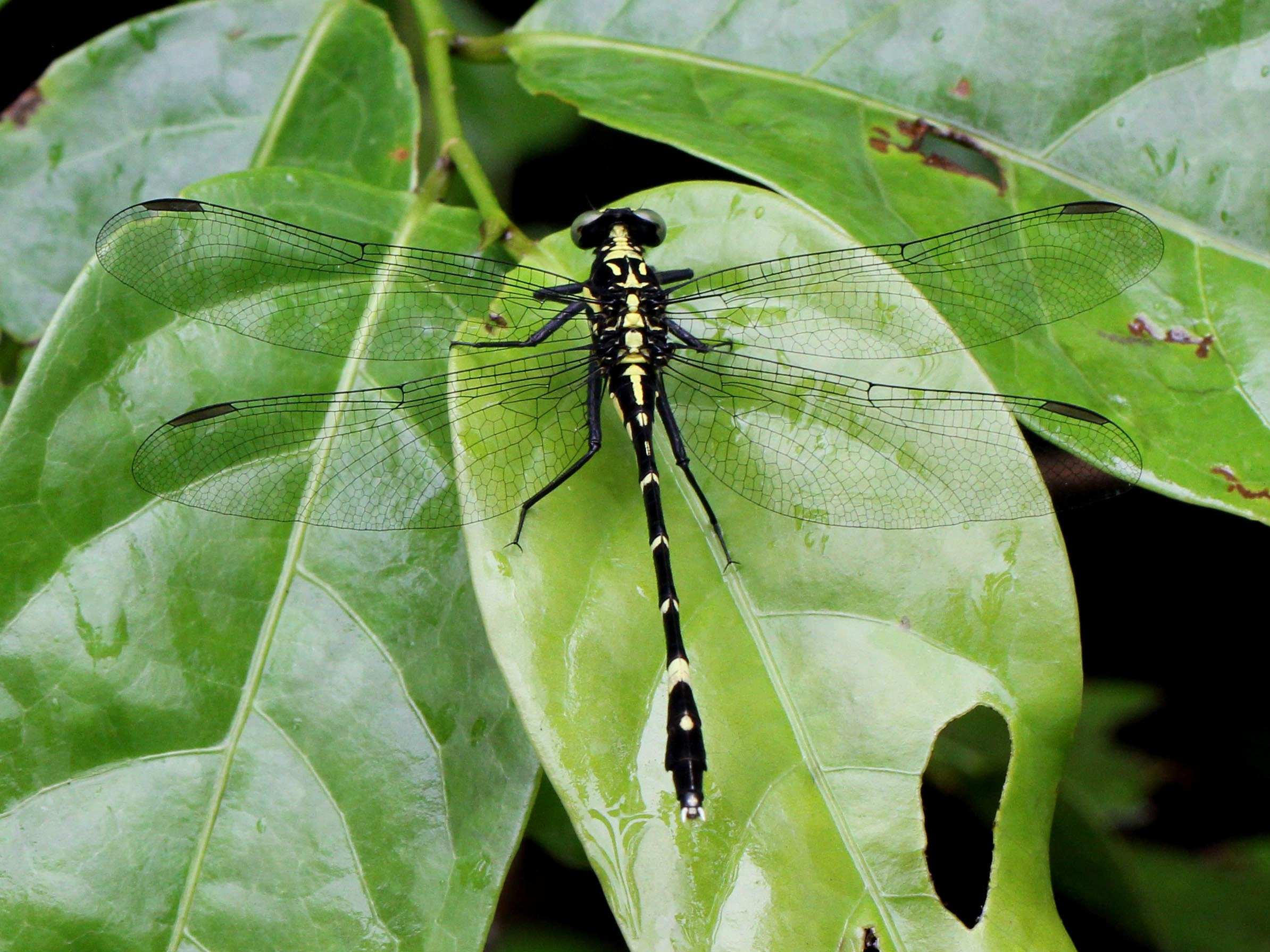
Female

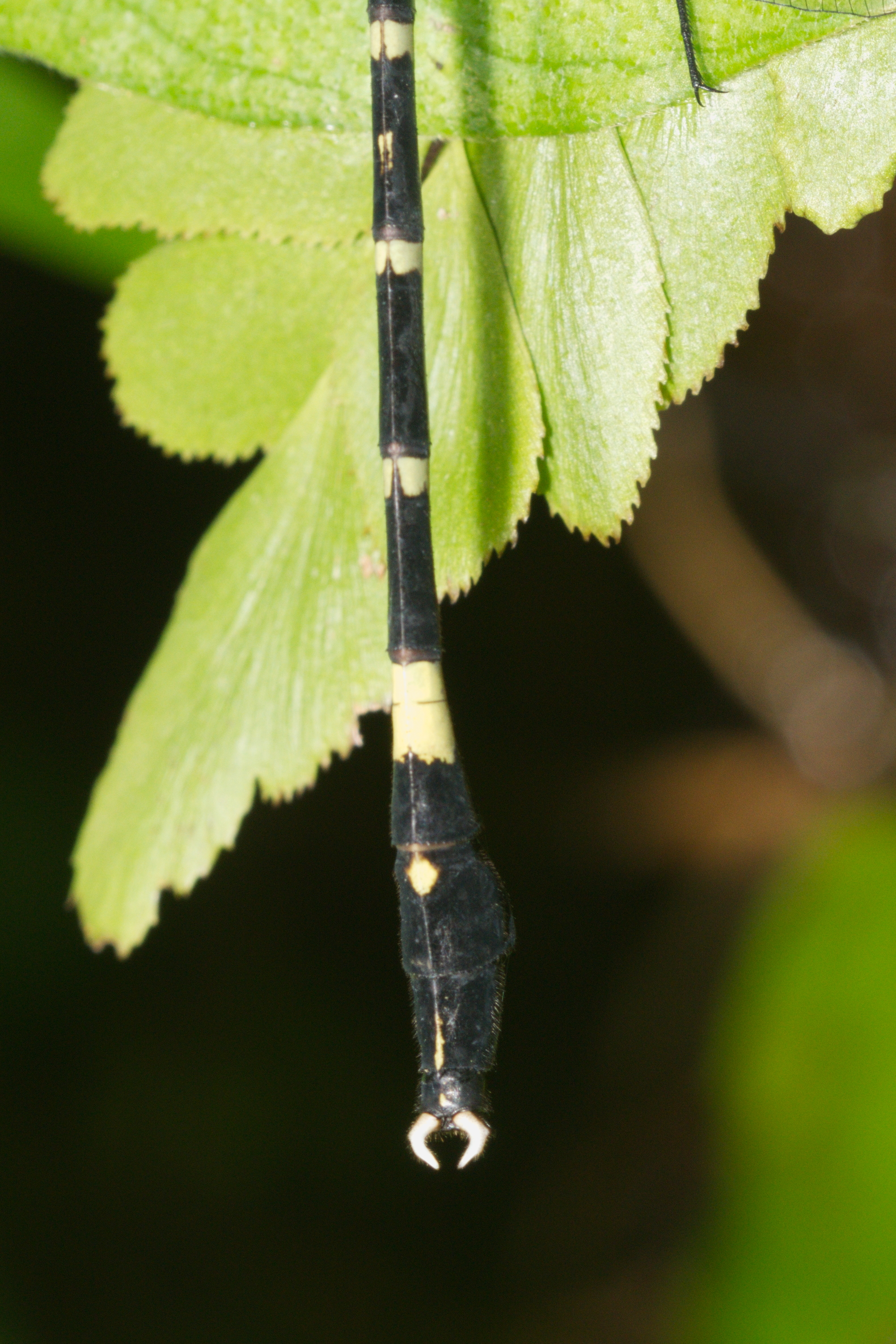
Anal appendages (male)

It is commonly found in marshlands, bogs or streams at the foot of hills.

== See also ==
- List of odonates of India
- List of odonata of Kerala
