= Gomphomacromiidae =

Scientific classification
- Kingdom: Animalia
- Phylum: Arthropoda
- Clade: Pancrustacea
- Class: Insecta
- Order: Odonata
- Infraorder: Anisoptera
- Superfamily: Libelluloidea
- Family: Gomphomacromiidae; Tillyard & Fraser, 1940

Genera
- Archaeophya; Gomphomacromia
- Distribution of Gomphomacromiidae

Family of dragonflies

Gomphomacromiidae is a small family of dragonflies within the superfamily Libelluloidea, occurring both in southern South America (Chile) and Australia.

The family comprises two genera, Archaeophya and Gomphomacromia, together containing a small number of species characterised by a combination of morphological traits that historically made their higher-level placement uncertain.

== Taxonomic history ==
Gomphomacromiidae has had a complicated taxonomic history. Although its genera were usually considered part of the superfamily Libelluloidea, the exact placement of Archaeophya was uncertain for many years, and it was often treated as incertae sedis by different authors.

Molecular and morphological studies published in 2025 helped to clarify this situation. These studies showed that Archaeophya and Gomphomacromia are closely related and form a distinct group within Libelluloidea, supporting their placement together in the family Gomphomacromiidae.

This arrangement, including both genera in Gomphomacromiidae, is followed by the World Odonata List (2025).

== Genera ==
The following genera are currently placed in Gomphomacromiidae:

- Archaeophya Fraser, 1959
- Gomphomacromia Brauer, 1864

== Etymology ==
The family name Gomphomacromiidae is derived from the type genus Gomphomacromia, with the standard zoological suffix -idae used for animal families.

The genus name Gomphomacromia is itself derived from the genera Gomphus and Macromia, whose names are derived from the Greek γόμφος (gomphos, "bolt" or "nail") and μακρός (makros, "long") respectively.
