= Pseudocordulia elliptica =

Ellipse-tipped mistfly

Conservation status
- Near Threatened (IUCN 3.1)

Scientific classification
- Kingdom: Animalia
- Phylum: Arthropoda
- Clade: Pancrustacea
- Class: Insecta
- Order: Odonata
- Suborder: Anisoptera
- Superfamily: Libelluloidea
- Family: Pseudocorduliidae
- Genus: Pseudocordulia
- Species: P. elliptica

Binomial name
- Pseudocordulia elliptica Tillyard, 1913

Species of dragonfly

Pseudocordulia elliptica, commonly known as an ellipse-tipped mistfly, is a species of dragonfly in the family Pseudocorduliidae. It is a medium-sized, bronze-black dragonfly with clear wings. It is endemic to north-eastern Queensland, Australia, where it inhabits rainforest streams.

== Etymology ==
The genus name Pseudocordulia is derived from the Greek ψευδής (pseudēs, "false" or "deceptive") combined with Cordulia, the name of a related genus, indicating that it is not a true member of that genus.

The species name elliptica is derived from the Greek ἔλλειψις (elleipsis, "ellipse"), referring to the elliptical shape of the male appendages.

== Gallery ==
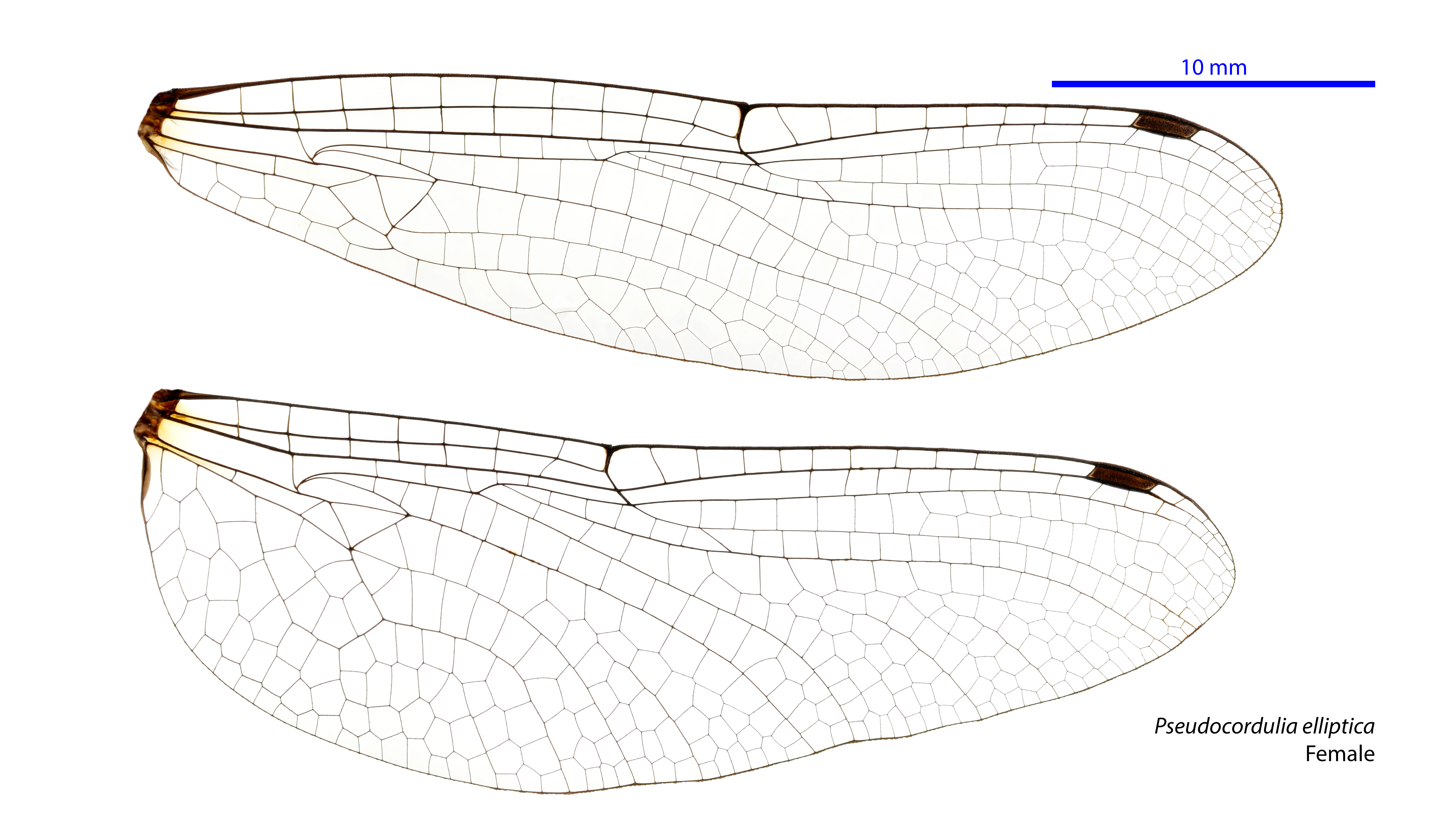
Female wings

== See also ==
- List of Odonata species of Australia
