= Lathrocordulia garrisoni =

Queensland swiftwing

Conservation status
- Data Deficient (IUCN 3.1)

Scientific classification
- Kingdom: Animalia
- Phylum: Arthropoda
- Clade: Pancrustacea
- Class: Insecta
- Order: Odonata
- Suborder: Anisoptera
- Superfamily: Libelluloidea
- Family: Austrocorduliidae
- Genus: Lathrocordulia
- Species: L. garrisoni

Binomial name
- Lathrocordulia garrisoni Theischinger & Watson, 1991
- Distribution in north-eastern Australia

Species of dragonfly

Lathrocordulia garrisoni is a species of dragonfly in the family Austrocorduliidae. It is also known as the Queensland swiftwing. It is a medium-sized, bronze to black dragonfly without pale markings. It is endemic to north-eastern Australia, where its natural habitat is subtropical or tropical moist montane forests.

== Etymology ==
The genus name Lathrocordulia combines the Greek λαθραῖος (lathraios, "hidden", "secret" or "furtive") with Cordulia, a genus name derived from the Greek κορδύλη (kordylē, "club" or "cudgel"). The name may refer to the uncertain or obscure relationship of the genus to other corduliid dragonflies.

In 1991, Günther Theischinger and Tony Watson named this species garrisoni, an eponym honouring Rosser Garrison, who collected the original specimen.

== Gallery ==
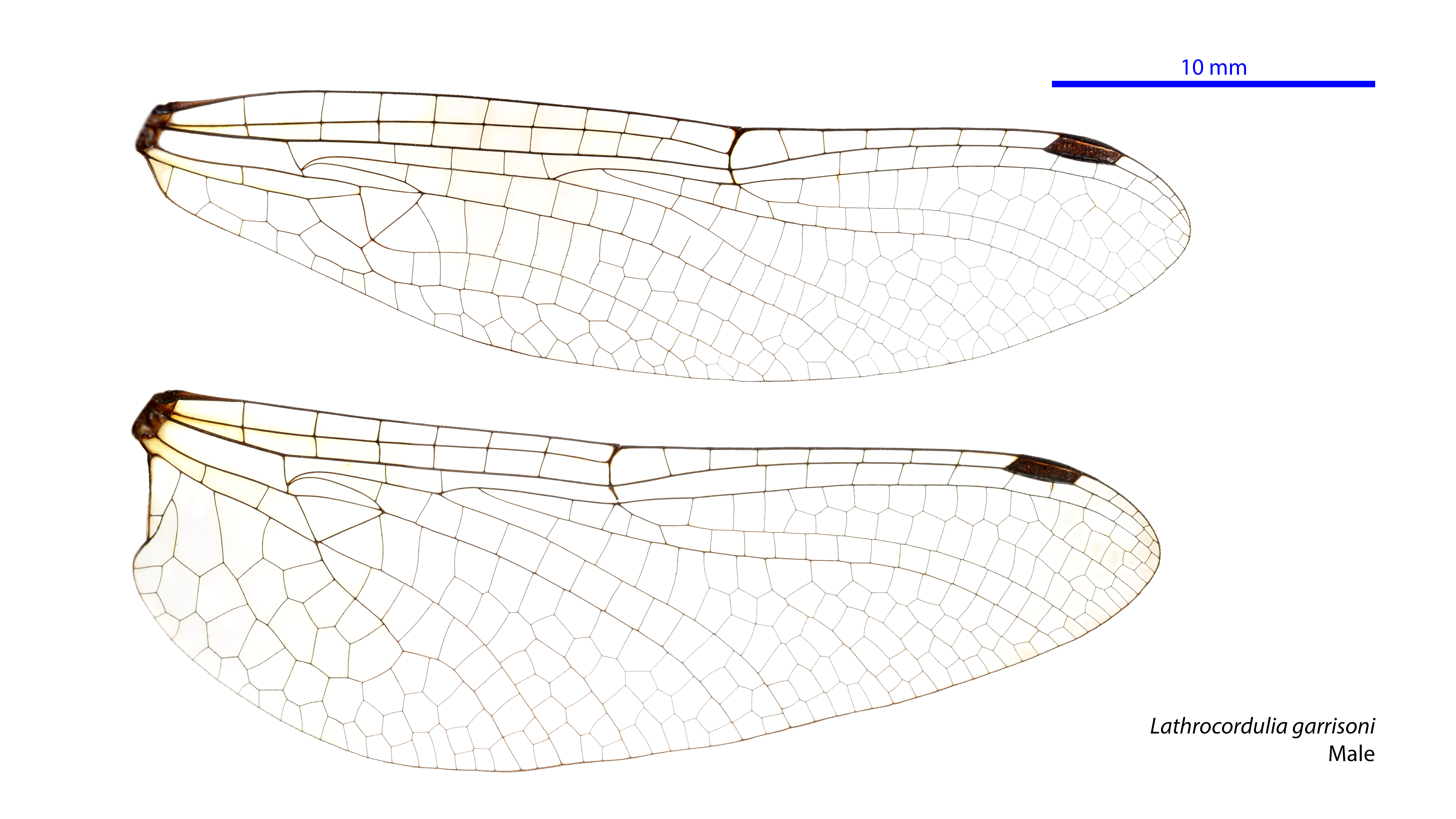
Male wings

== See also ==
- List of Odonata species of Australia
