= Pseudocordulia =

Scientific classification
- Kingdom: Animalia
- Phylum: Arthropoda
- Clade: Pancrustacea
- Class: Insecta
- Order: Odonata
- Suborder: Anisoptera
- Superfamily: Libelluloidea
- Family: Pseudocorduliidae
- Genus: Pseudocordulia; Tillyard, 1909

Species
- Pseudocordulia circularis; Pseudocordulia elliptica

Genus of dragonflies

Pseudocordulia is the only genus of dragonflies in the family, Pseudocorduliidae. They are medium-sized, bronze-black dragonflies with clear wings, and are endemic to tropical north-eastern Australia.

== Recent taxonomic history ==
Until about 2013, Pseudocordulia was considered to be the only genus in the family Pseudocorduliidae. Research and taxonomic updates led to Pseudocorduliidae no longer being recognised as a family, and the genus Pseudocordulia being placed incertae sedis within the superfamily Libelluloidea. Its precise placement remained uncertain for some years.

In 2025, molecular and morphological analyses helped to resolve this uncertainty. These studies supported Pseudocorduliidae as a distinct family within Libelluloidea.

== Species ==
The genus Pseudocordulia includes the following two species:

- Pseudocordulia circularis Tillyard, 1909
- Pseudocordulia elliptica Tillyard, 1913

== Etymology ==
The genus name Pseudocordulia is derived from the Greek ψευδής (pseudēs, "false" or "deceptive") combined with Cordulia, the name of a related genus, indicating that it is not a true member of that genus.
