= Lathrocordulia metallica =

Western swiftwing

Conservation status
- Vulnerable (IUCN 3.1)

Scientific classification
- Kingdom: Animalia
- Phylum: Arthropoda
- Clade: Pancrustacea
- Class: Insecta
- Order: Odonata
- Suborder: Anisoptera
- Superfamily: Libelluloidea
- Family: Austrocorduliidae
- Genus: Lathrocordulia
- Species: L. metallica

Binomial name
- Lathrocordulia metallica Tillyard, 1911
- Distribution in south-western Australia

Species of dragonfly

Lathrocordulia metallica is a species of dragonfly in the family Austrocorduliidae, commonly known as the Western swiftwing. It is a medium-sized, bronze to black coloured dragonfly without pale markings, endemic to south-western Australia. It inhabits streams.

== Etymology ==
The genus name Lathrocordulia combines the Greek λαθραῖος (lathraios, "hidden", "secret" or "furtive") with Cordulia, a genus name derived from the Greek κορδύλη (kordylē, "club" or "cudgel"). The name may refer to the uncertain or obscure relationship of the genus to other corduliid dragonflies.

The species name metallica is derived from the Greek μεταλλικός (metallikos, "metallic"), referring to the colour of the thorax.

== Gallery ==
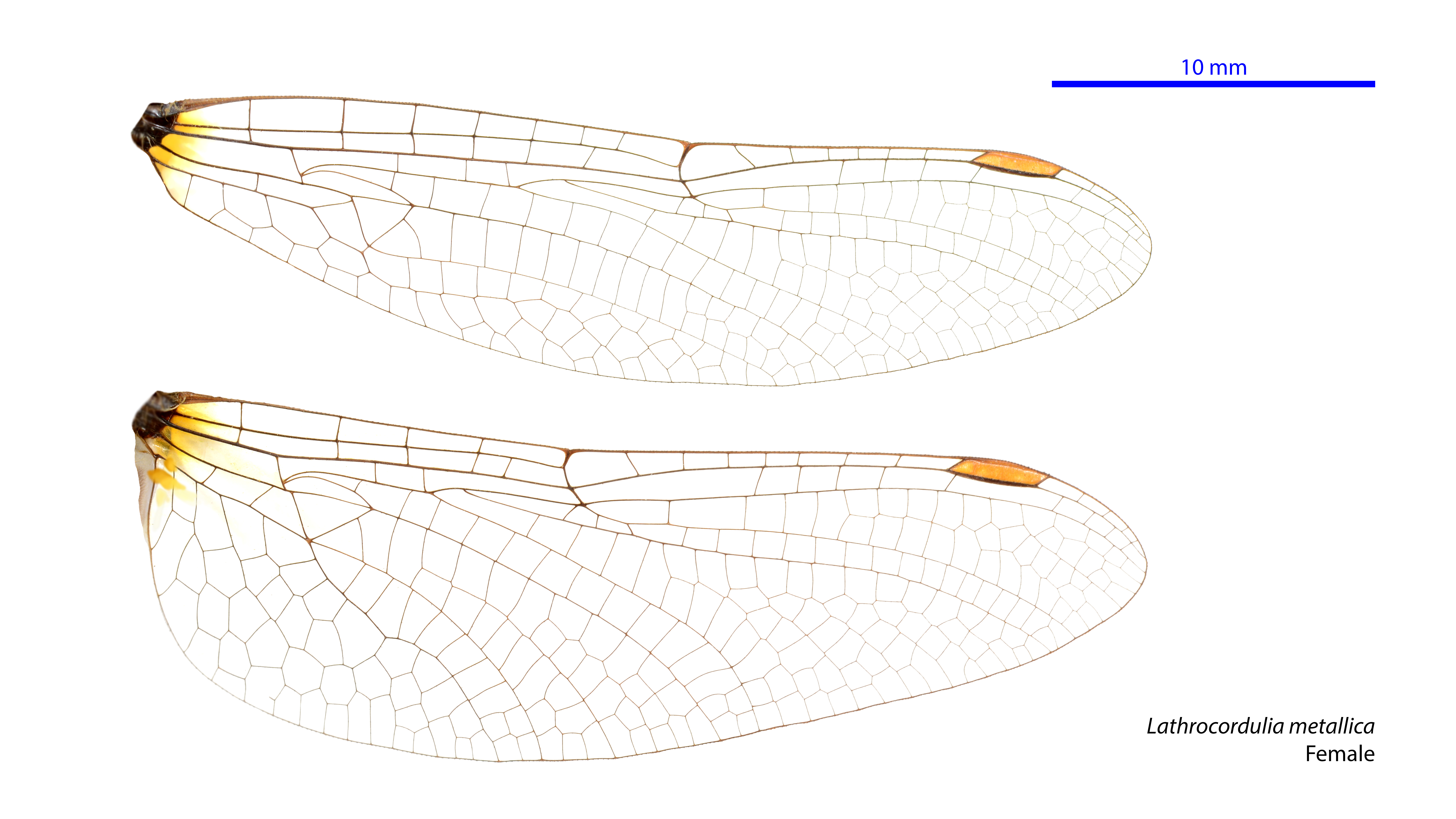
Female wings

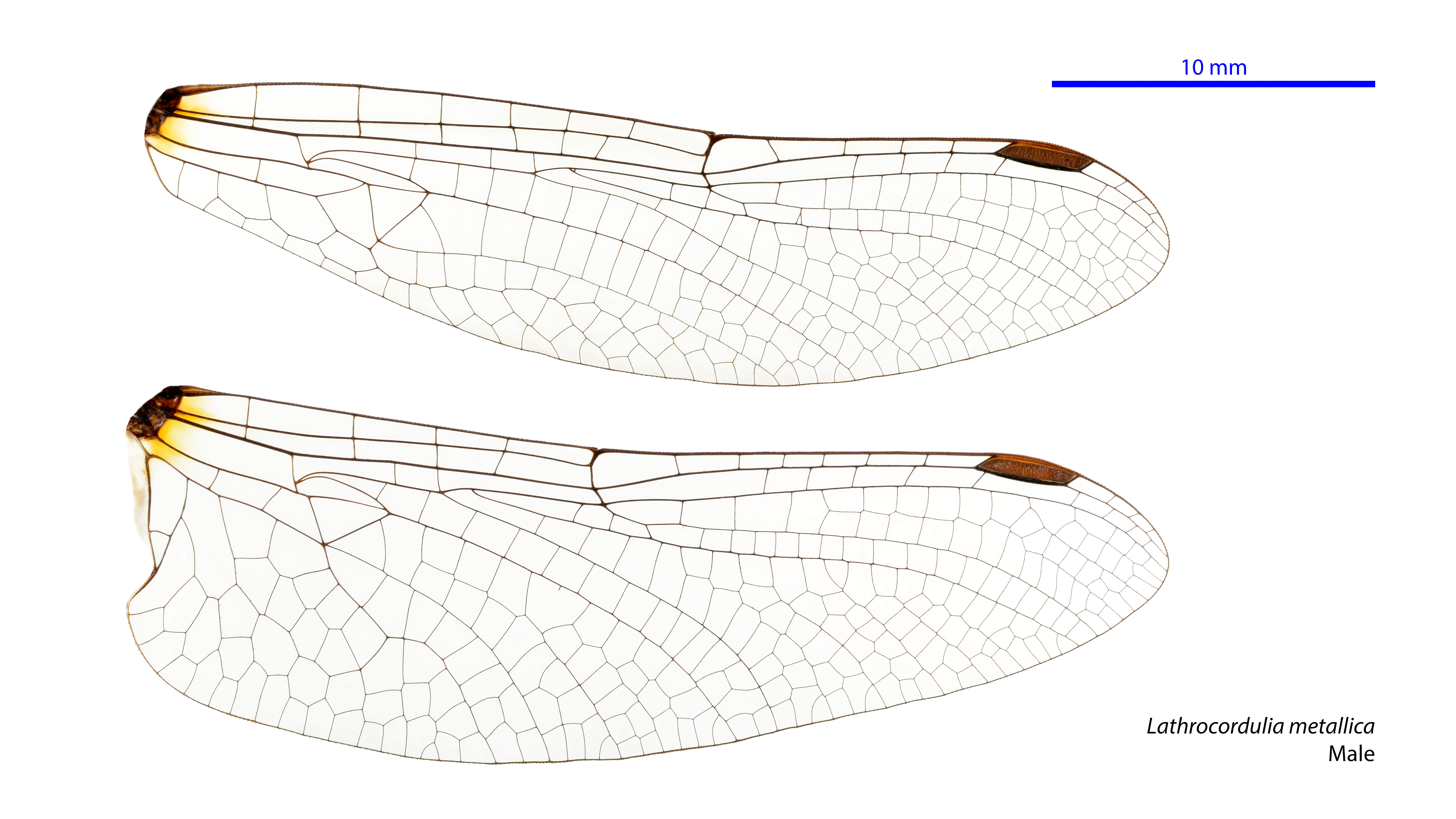
Male wings

== See also ==
- List of Odonata species of Australia
