= Austrocordulia territoria =

Top End hawk

Conservation status
- Near Threatened (IUCN 3.1)

Scientific classification
- Kingdom: Animalia
- Phylum: Arthropoda
- Clade: Pancrustacea
- Class: Insecta
- Order: Odonata
- Suborder: Anisoptera
- Superfamily: Libelluloidea
- Family: Austrocorduliidae
- Genus: Austrocordulia
- Species: A. territoria

Binomial name
- Austrocordulia territoria Theischinger & Watson, 1978
- Distribution in coastal northern Australia

Species of dragonfly

Austrocordulia territoria is a species of dragonfly in the family Austrocorduliidae. It is listed as Near Threatened by the IUCN. Commonly known as the Top End hawk, it is a medium-sized, black and yellow dragonfly endemic to the coastal Northern Territory, Australia. Its natural habitat includes streams.

== Etymology ==
The genus name Austrocordulia combines the prefix austro- (from Latin auster, meaning “south wind”, hence “southern”) with Cordulia, a genus name derived from Greek κορδύλη (kordylē, “club” or “cudgel”), alluding to the clubbed shape of the abdomen in males.

The species name territoria is derived from the Latin territorium ("territory"), referring to the Northern Territory, where the species was first recorded.

== Gallery ==
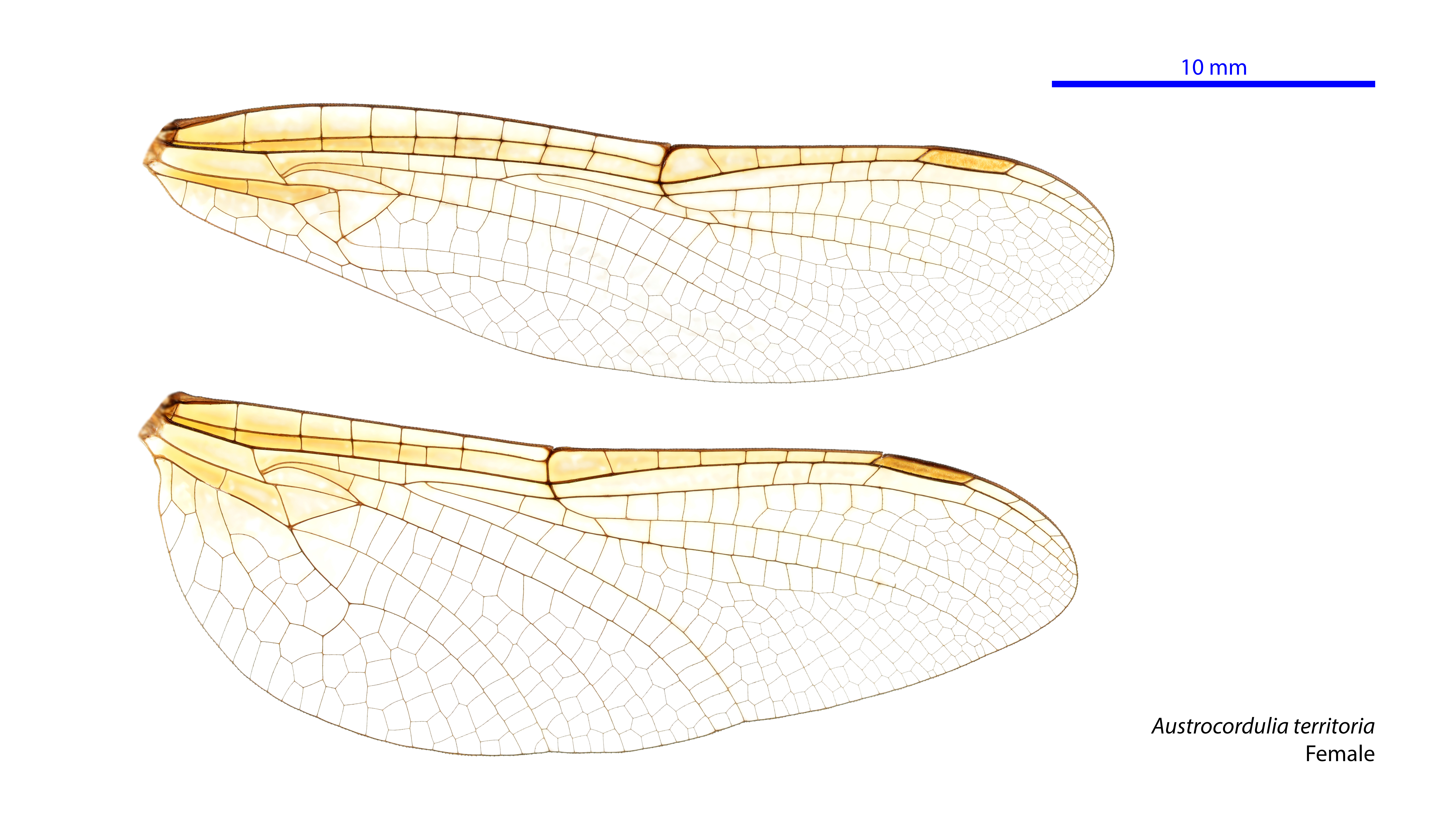
Female wings

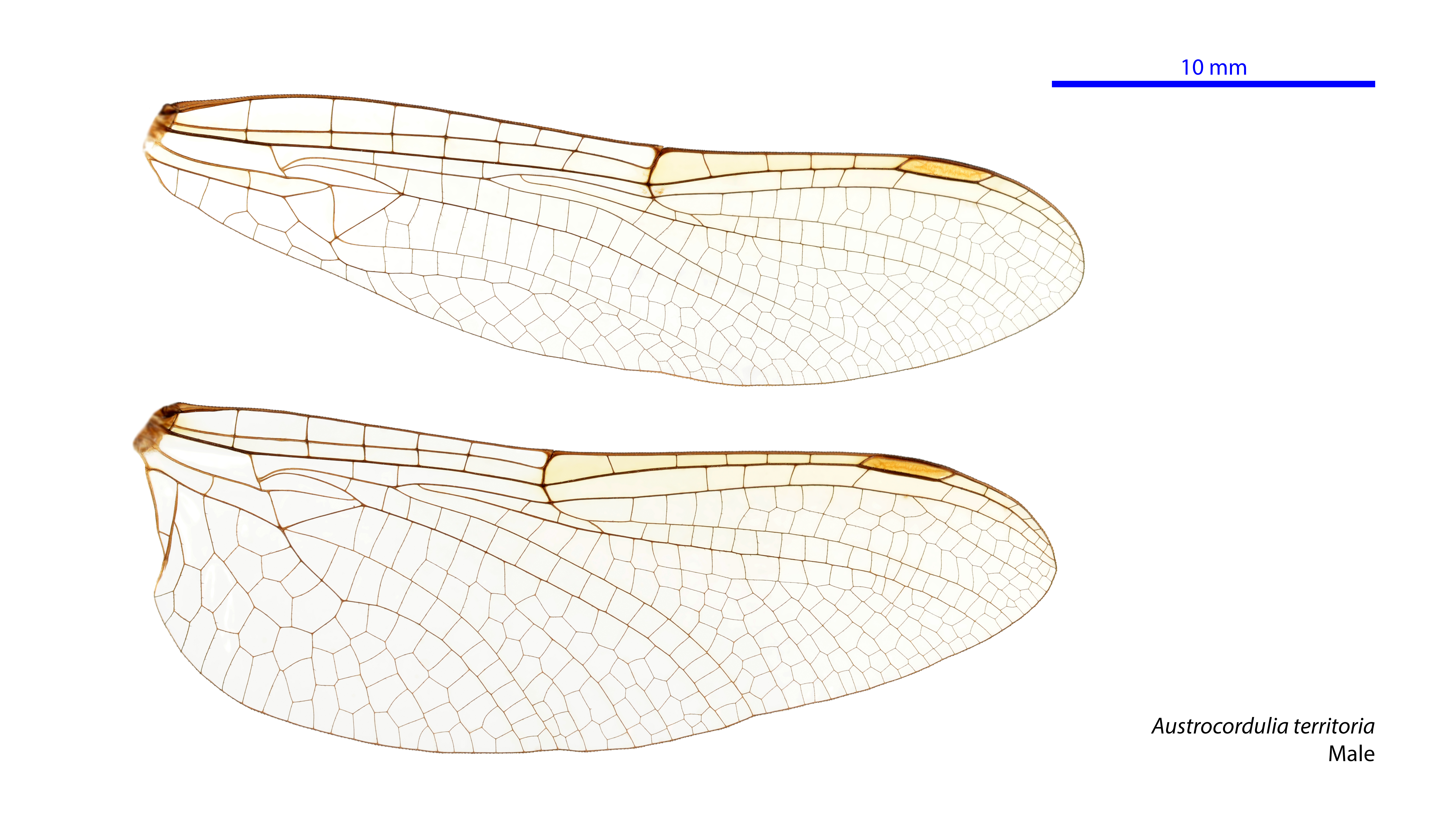
Male wings

== See also ==
- List of Odonata species of Australia
