= Lathrocordulia =

Scientific classification
- Kingdom: Animalia
- Phylum: Arthropoda
- Clade: Pancrustacea
- Class: Insecta
- Order: Odonata
- Suborder: Anisoptera
- Superfamily: Libelluloidea
- Family: Austrocorduliidae
- Genus: Lathrocordulia; Tillyard, 1911
- Distribution in Australia

Genus of dragonflies

Lathrocordulia is a genus of dragonflies in the family Austrocorduliidae, endemic to Australia. Species of Lathrocordulia are medium-sized, bronze to black dragonflies without pale markings.

== Species ==
The genus Lathrocordulia includes the following species:

- Lathrocordulia garrisoni Theischinger & Watson, 1991 – Queensland swiftwing
- Lathrocordulia metallica Tillyard, 1911 – Western swiftwing

== Taxonomy ==
Lathrocordulia was described by Robin Tillyard in 1911. Its family placement has varied in historical classifications, including assignments to Corduliidae and Synthemistidae. It was also treated as incertae sedis within the superfamily Libelluloidea. More recent classifications now place it in the family Austrocorduliidae.

== Etymology ==
The genus name Lathrocordulia combines the Greek λαθραῖος (lathraios, "hidden", "secret" or "furtive") with Cordulia, a genus name derived from the Greek κορδύλη (kordylē, "club" or "cudgel"). The name may refer to the uncertain or obscure relationship of the genus to other corduliid dragonflies.

== See also ==
- List of Odonata species of Australia
