= Austrocordulia leonardi =

Sydney hawk

Conservation status
- Vulnerable (IUCN 3.1)

Scientific classification
- Kingdom: Animalia
- Phylum: Arthropoda
- Clade: Pancrustacea
- Class: Insecta
- Order: Odonata
- Suborder: Anisoptera
- Superfamily: Libelluloidea
- Family: Austrocorduliidae
- Genus: Austrocordulia
- Species: A. leonardi

Binomial name
- Austrocordulia leonardi Theischinger, 1973
- Distribution in the Sydney Basin region of New South Wales

Species of dragonfly

Austrocordulia leonardi is a species of dragonfly in the family Austrocorduliidae. It is classified as Vulnerable by the IUCN. Commonly known as the Sydney hawk, it is a medium-sized black and yellow dragonfly endemic to the Sydney Basin in New South Wales, Australia. It inhabits rivers and dams.

Austrocordulia leonardi is threatened by habitat loss.

== Etymology ==
The genus name Austrocordulia combines the prefix austro- (from Latin auster, meaning “south wind”, hence “southern”) with Cordulia, a genus name derived from Greek κορδύλη (kordylē, “club” or “cudgel”), alluding to the clubbed shape of the abdomen in males.

In 1973, Günther Theischinger named this species leonardi, an eponym honouring his friend Leonard Müller for assistance provided during his studies.

== Gallery ==
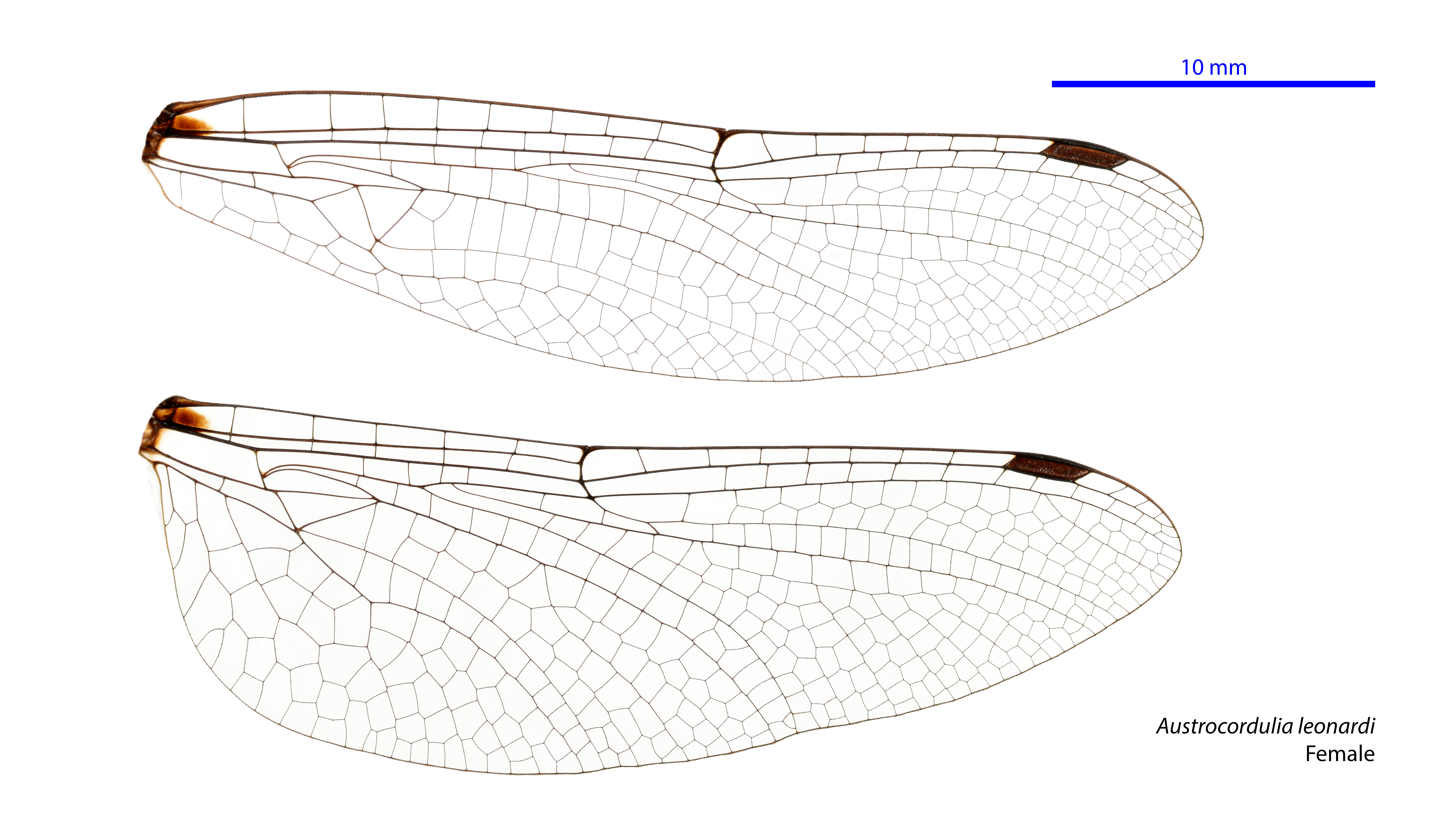
Female wings

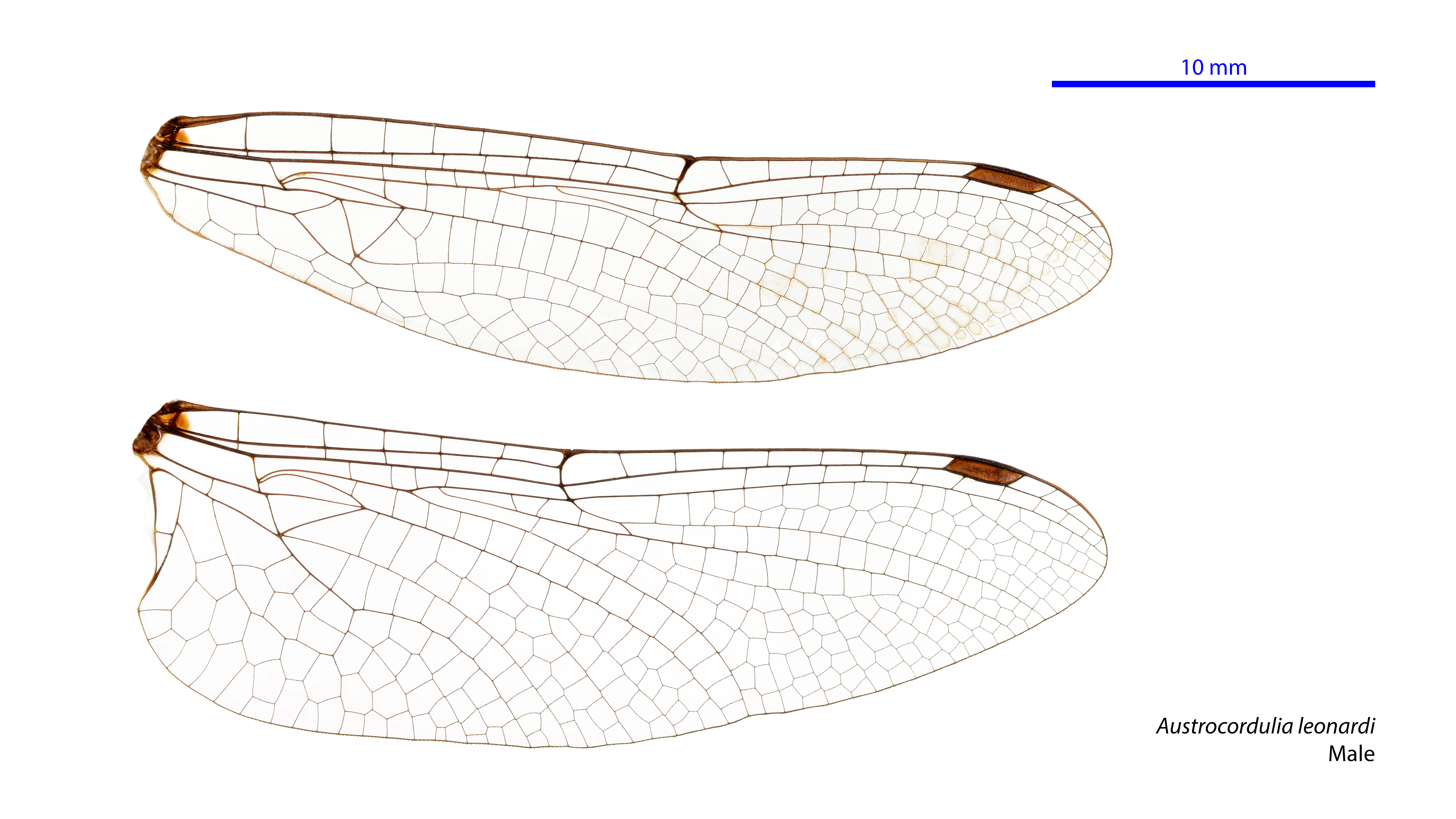
Male wings

== See also ==
- List of Odonata species of Australia
