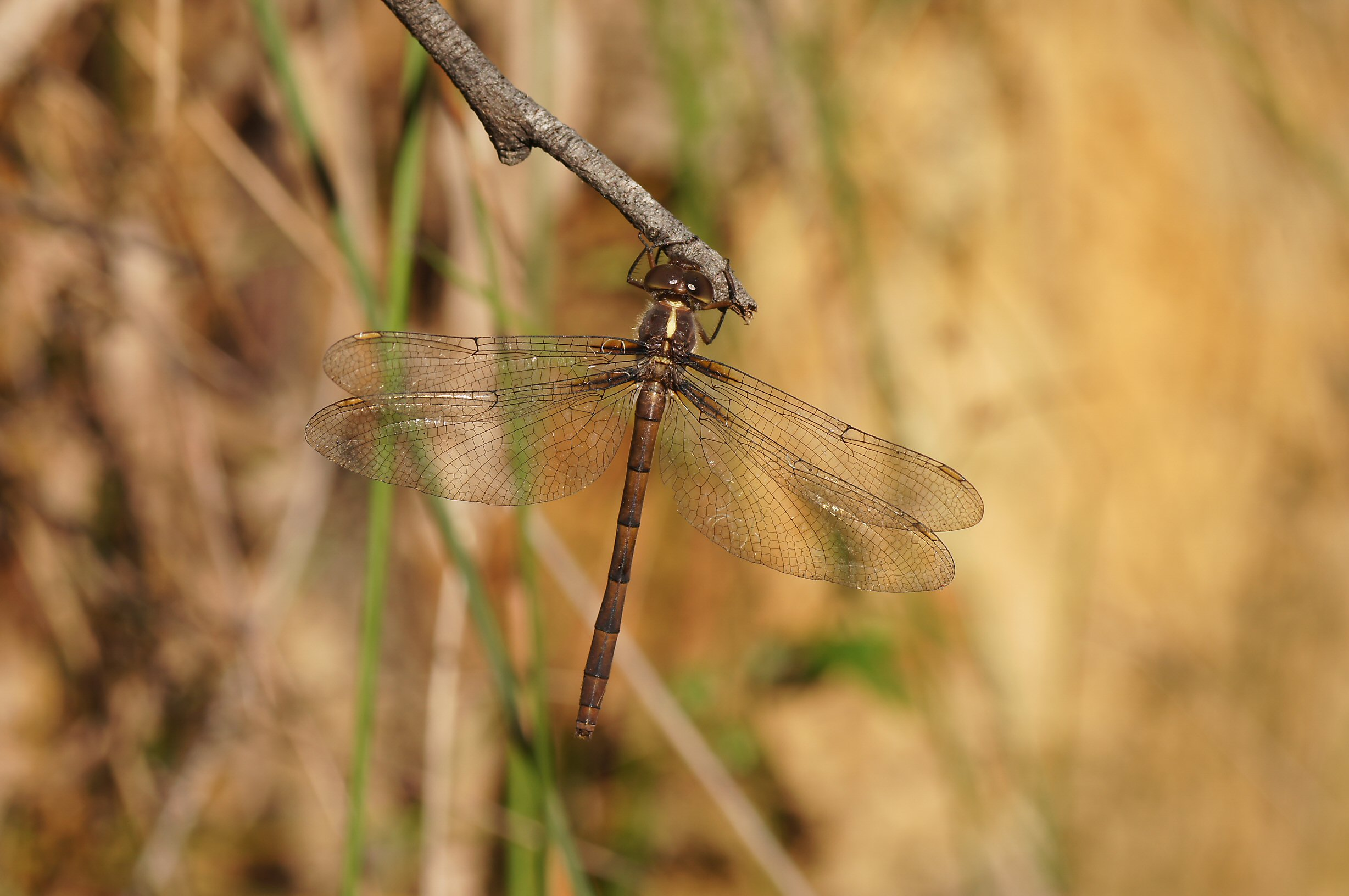
- Female Austrocordulia refracta Gippsland, Victoria

Conservation status
- Least Concern (IUCN 3.1)

Scientific classification
- Kingdom: Animalia
- Phylum: Arthropoda
- Clade: Pancrustacea
- Class: Insecta
- Order: Odonata
- Suborder: Anisoptera
- Superfamily: Libelluloidea
- Family: Austrocorduliidae
- Genus: Austrocordulia
- Species: A. refracta

Binomial name
- Austrocordulia refracta Tillyard, 1909
- Distribution in eastern Australia

= Austrocordulia refracta =

Eastern hawk

Species of dragonfly

Austrocordulia refracta is a species of dragonfly in the family Austrocorduliidae. It is listed as Least Concern by the IUCN. Commonly known as the eastern hawk, it is a medium-sized, dull brown dragonfly endemic to eastern Australia. Its natural habitat includes streams and pools.

== Etymology ==
The genus name Austrocordulia combines the prefix austro- (from Latin auster, meaning “south wind”, hence “southern”) with Cordulia, a genus name derived from Greek κορδύλη (kordylē, “club” or “cudgel”), alluding to the clubbed shape of the abdomen in males.

The species name refracta is derived from the Latin refractus ("bent back" or "broken"), referring to the peculiarly bent appearance of the male appendages.

== Gallery ==
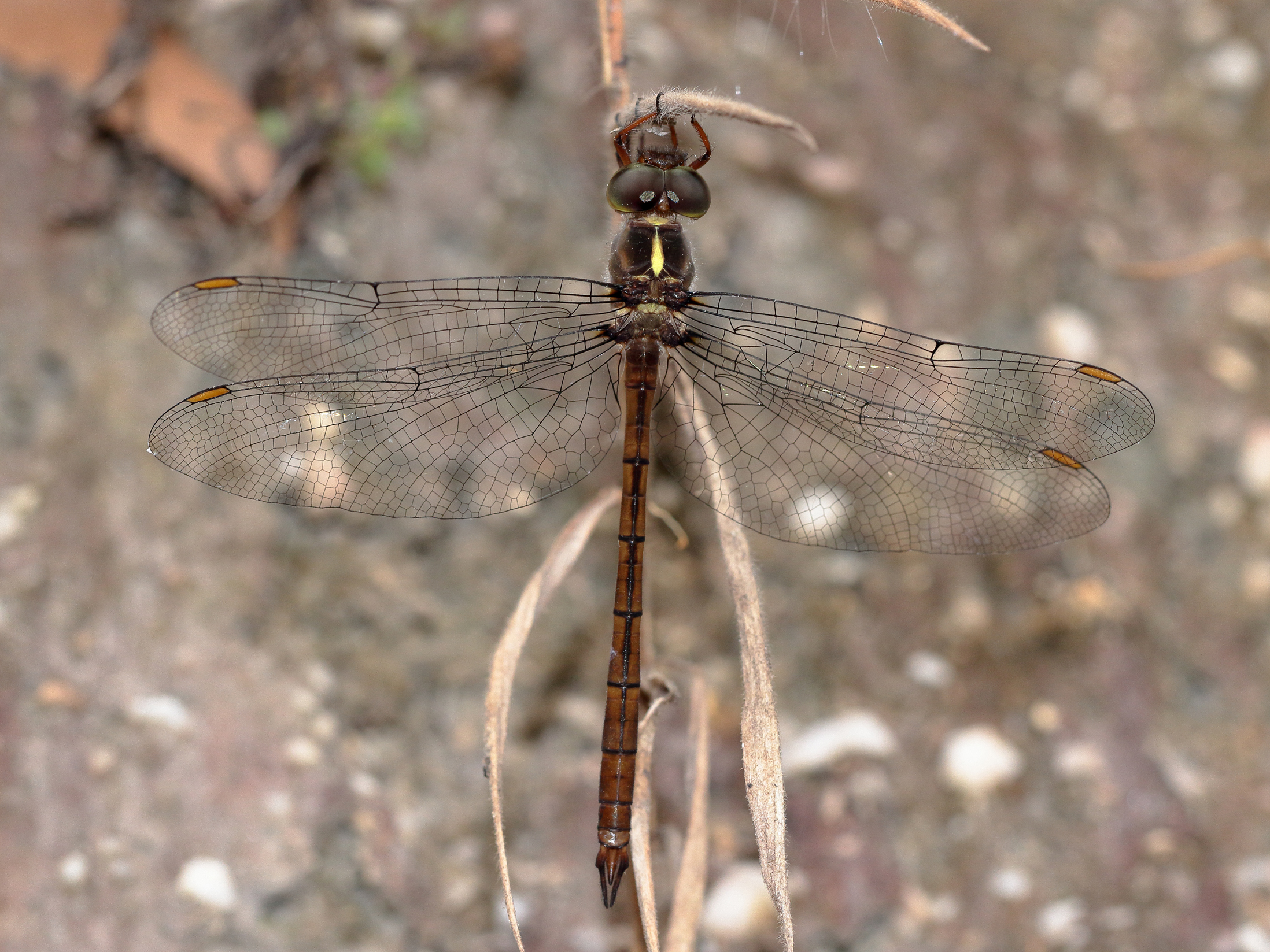
Male dorsal view, Queensland

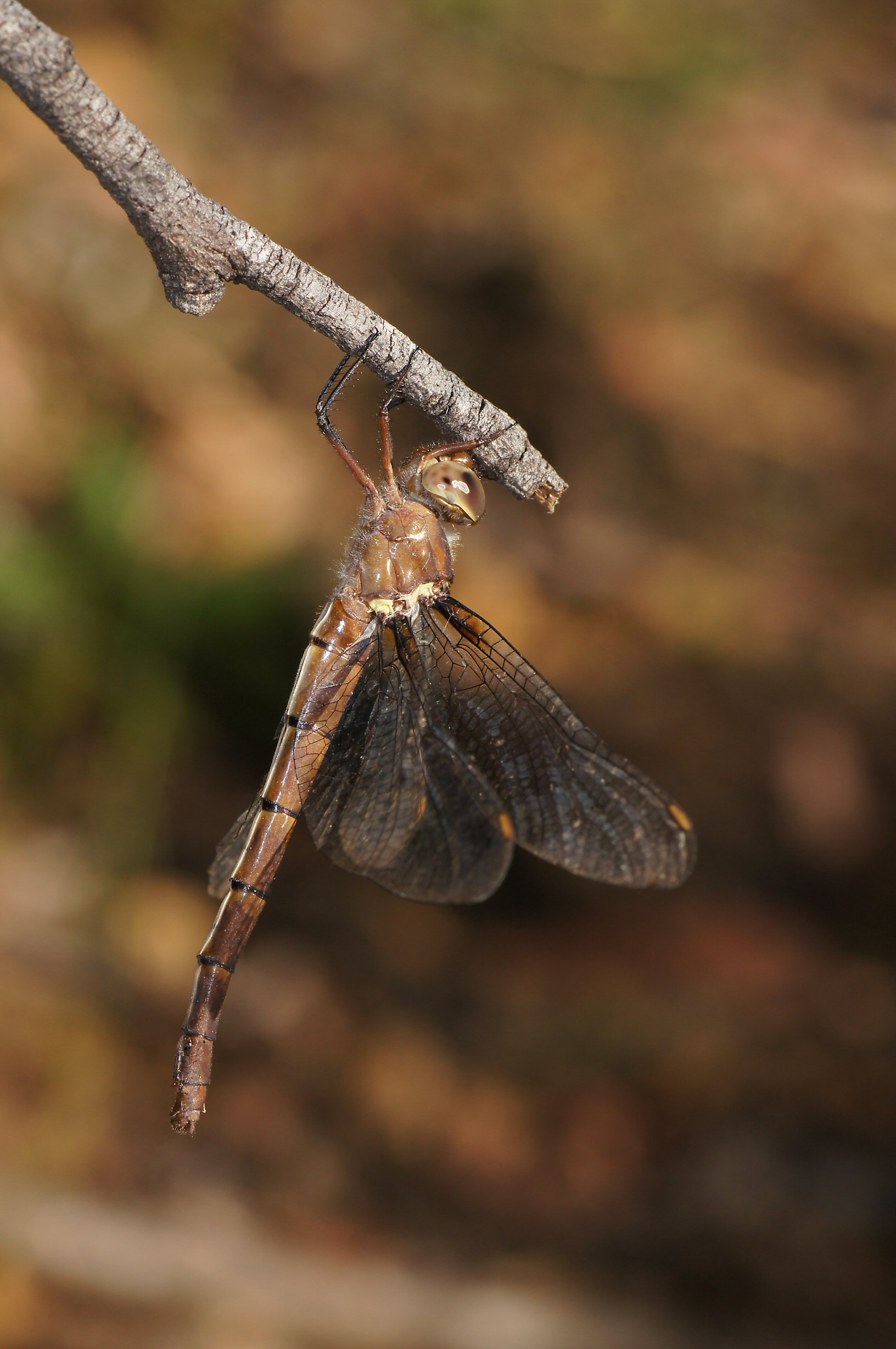
Female in profile

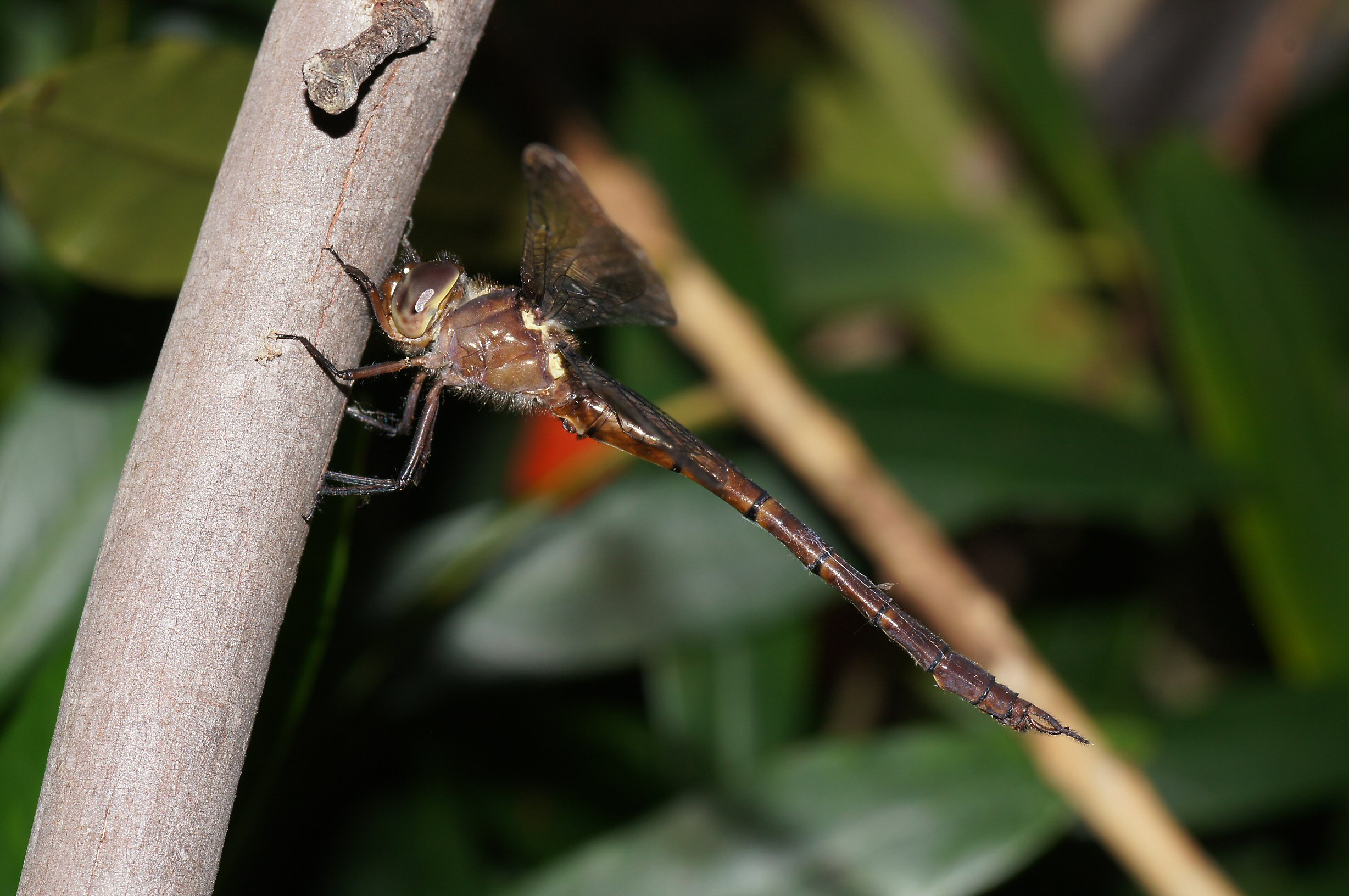
Male in profile

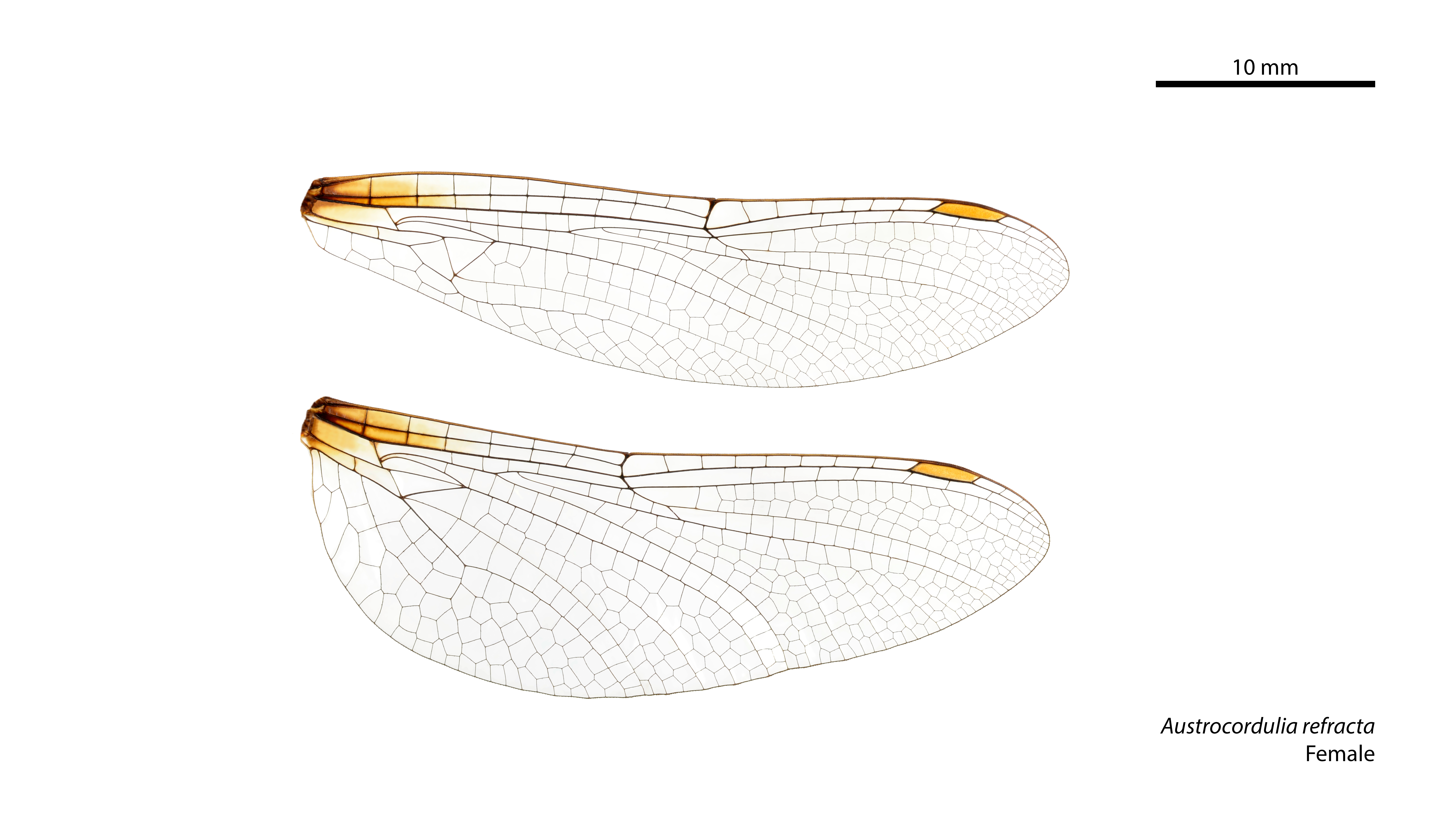
Female wings

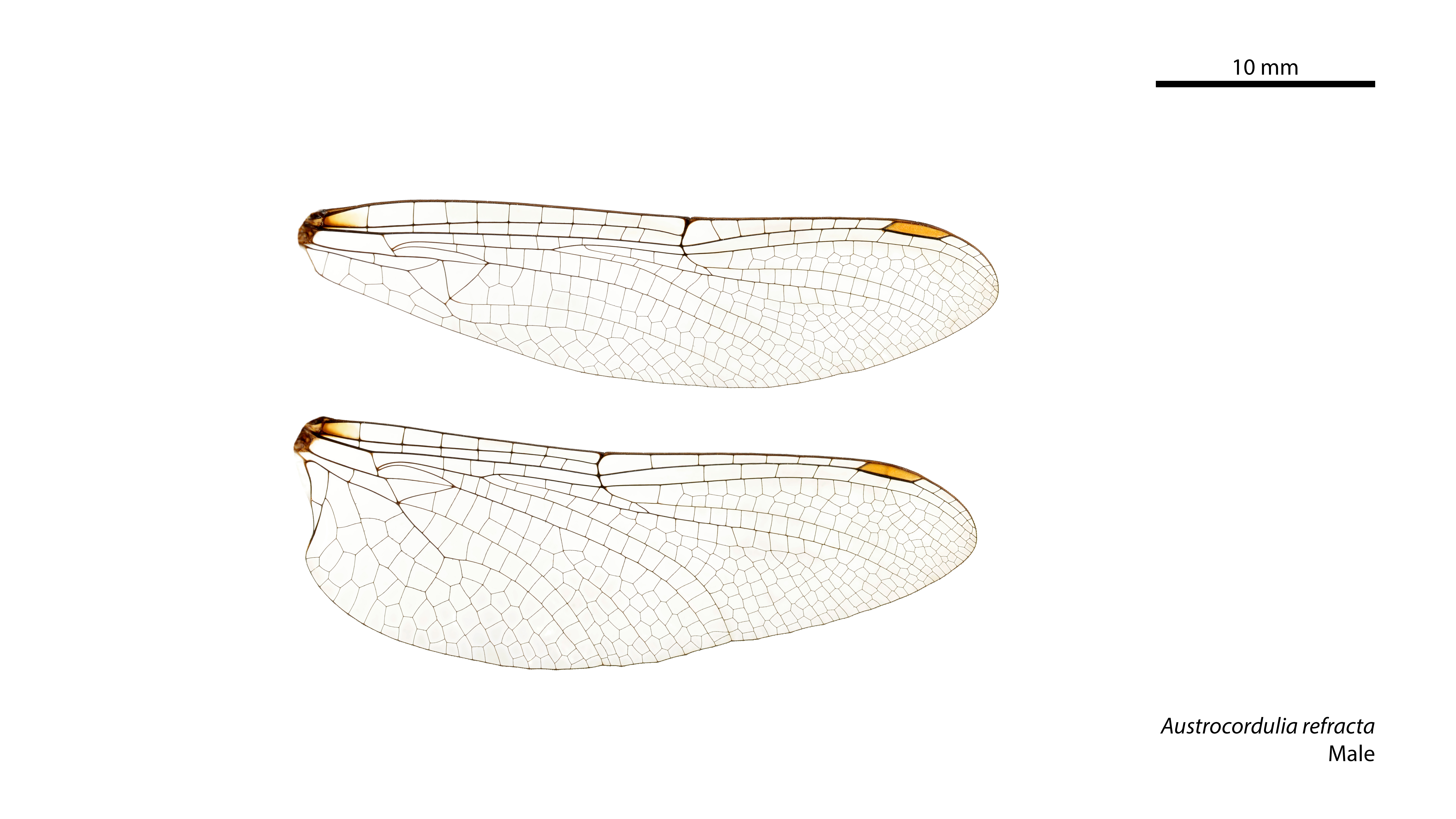
Male wings

== See also ==
- List of Odonata species of Australia
