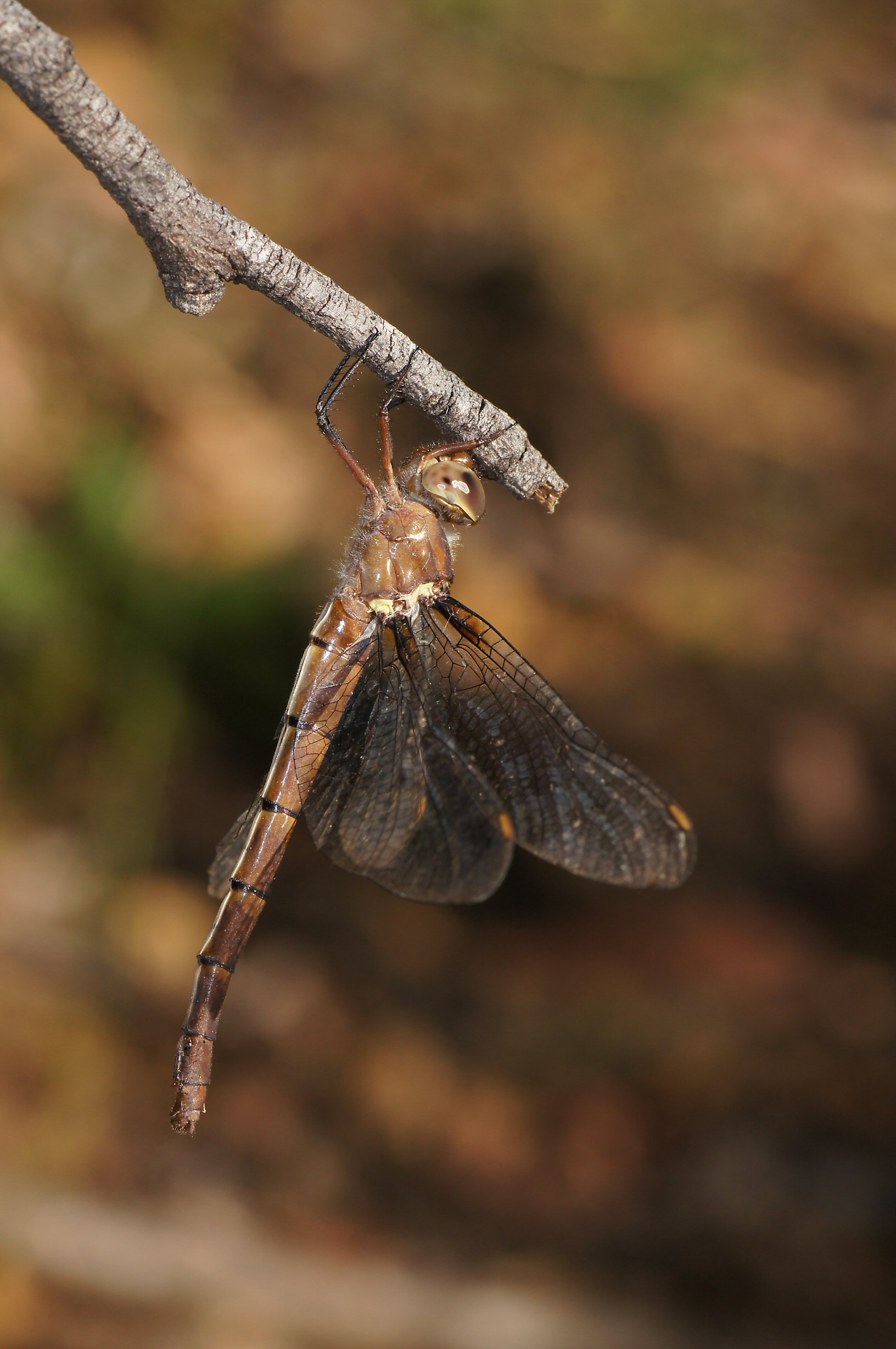
- Austrocordulia refracta

Scientific classification
- Kingdom: Animalia
- Phylum: Arthropoda
- Clade: Pancrustacea
- Class: Insecta
- Order: Odonata
- Suborder: Anisoptera
- Superfamily: Libelluloidea
- Family: Austrocorduliidae
- Genus: Austrocordulia; Tillyard, 1909
- Distribution of Austrocordulia in northern and eastern Australia

= Austrocordulia =

Genus of dragonflies

Austrocordulia is a genus of dragonfly in the family Austrocorduliidae. It is endemic to northern and eastern Australia. Species of Austrocordulia are medium-sized, dark-coloured dragonflies, either brown or black with yellow markings.

== Taxonomic history ==
The genus Austrocordulia is currently placed in the family Austrocorduliidae following recent taxonomic revision.

Earlier sources considered it part of several different families including Synthemistidae and Corduliidae, and at one point it was regarded as incertae sedis within Libelluloidea.

== Species ==
The genus includes the following species:

- Austrocordulia leonardi Theischinger, 1973 – Sydney hawk
- Austrocordulia refracta Tillyard, 1909 – eastern hawk
- Austrocordulia territoria Theischinger & Watson, 1978 – Top End hawk

== Etymology ==
The genus name Austrocordulia combines the prefix austro- (from Latin auster, meaning “south wind”, hence “southern”) with Cordulia, a genus name derived from Greek κορδύλη (kordylē, “club” or “cudgel”), alluding to the clubbed shape of the abdomen in males. The name refers to a southern representative of that group.

== See also ==
- List of Odonata species of Australia
