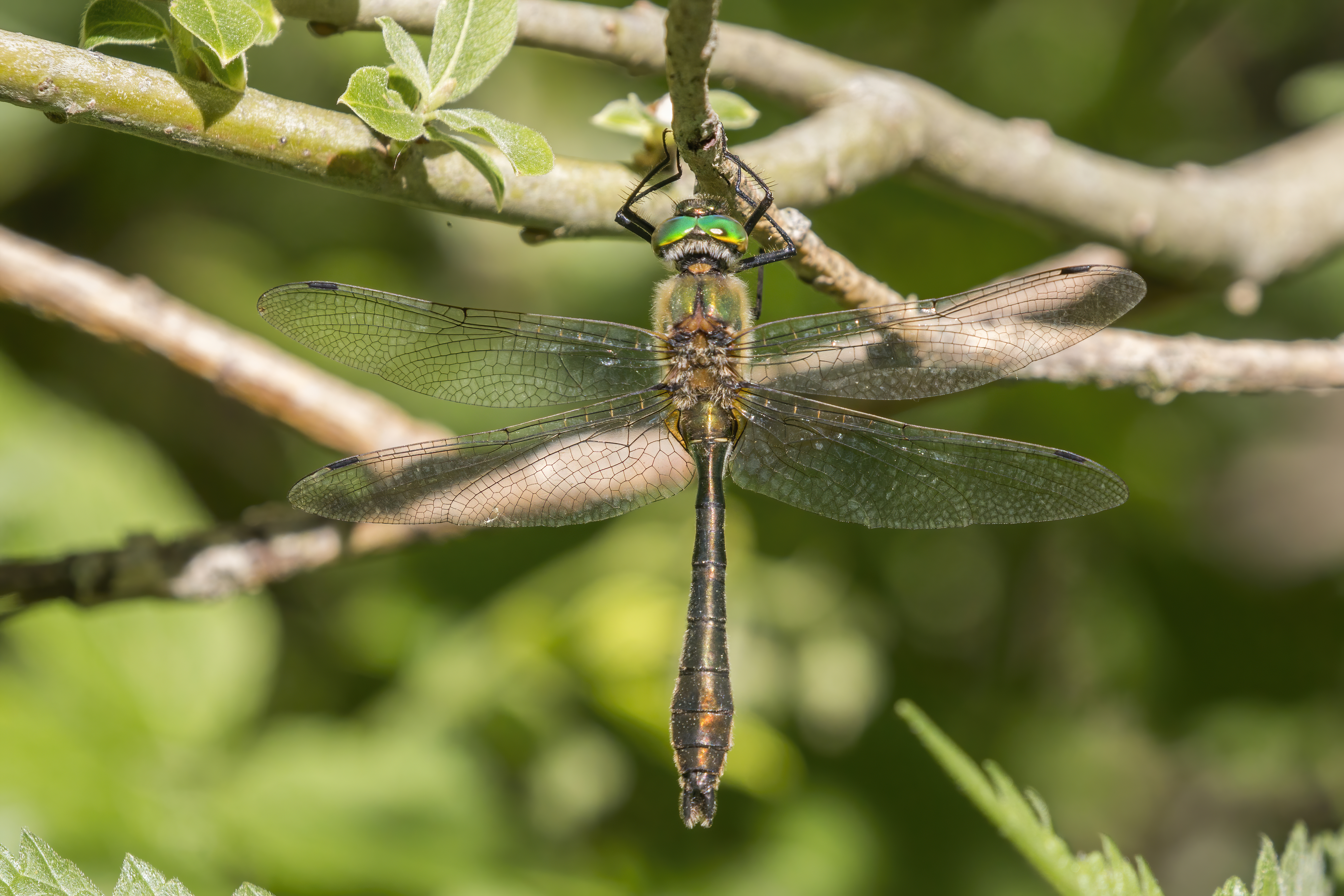
- Male, Estonia

Conservation status
- Least Concern (IUCN 3.1)

Scientific classification
- Kingdom: Animalia
- Phylum: Arthropoda
- Class: Insecta
- Order: Odonata
- Infraorder: Anisoptera
- Family: Corduliidae
- Genus: Cordulia
- Species: C. aenea

Binomial name
- Cordulia aenea (Linnaeus, 1758)

= Downy emerald =

Species of dragonfly

The downy emerald (Cordulia aenea) is a species of dragonfly. It is metallic green and bronze in color, and its thorax is coated with fine hairs, hence its name. Like most other emeralds, the downy emerald has bright shiny green eyes. Adults are around 5 cm (2.0 in) in length, and are in flight from May through July each year.

This species lives in woodlands near lakes and ponds; like other dragonflies, it lays eggs in water and its larvae are aquatic. It is distributed throughout most of Europe. Although it has been eliminated from some of its historic native area in Great Britain due to habitat loss, dense populations of the downy emerald can still be found there in spots where its ideal habitat remains.

After the downy emerald young emerge from their eggs, they live for three years at various larval and nymphal stages. They are fully grown adults for only two months, during which this time they mate and the females deposit their eggs back into the water. Female individuals of the Cordulia aenea (C. aenea) species have panoistic ovaries that produce female sex cells, or oocytes. The nucleus of the panoistic oocyte likely contains all the necessary genetic material to develop the oocyte on its own, form the C. aenea egg yolk, and develop the C. aenea embryo.

== Subspecies ==
- Cordulia aenea amurensis Selys, 1887
