= American emerald =

- female, Banff National Park

Conservation status
- Least Concern (IUCN 3.1)

Scientific classification
- Kingdom: Animalia
- Phylum: Arthropoda
- Clade: Pancrustacea
- Class: Insecta
- Order: Odonata
- Suborder: Anisoptera
- Superfamily: Libelluloidea
- Family: Corduliidae
- Genus: Cordulia
- Species: C. shurtleffii

Binomial name
- Cordulia shurtleffii Scudder, 1866

Species of dragonfly

The American emerald (Cordulia shurtleffii) is a species of dragonfly found in North America. It is colored mostly black with a yellow ring between segments 2 and 3.. The distribution range of this dragonfly includes the northern United States and Canada, with a typical body length ranging from 1.7 to 2.0 inches.
