= Pseudocorduliidae =

Scientific classification
- Kingdom: Animalia
- Phylum: Arthropoda
- Clade: Pancrustacea
- Class: Insecta
- Order: Odonata
- Suborder: Anisoptera
- Superfamily: Libelluloidea
- Family: Pseudocorduliidae; Lohmann, 1996

Genus
- Pseudocordulia Tillyard, 1909
- Distribution of Pseudocorduliidae

Family of dragonflies

Pseudocorduliidae is a family of dragonflies with a single genus, Pseudocordulia. It is endemic to Australia.

== Characteristics ==
Members of Pseudocorduliidae are medium-sized, bronze-black dragonflies. The larvae are wide, flat and hairy with strongly protruding eyes. They are found along rainforest streams in north-eastern Queensland.

== Taxonomic history ==
Pseudocorduliidae has had a complex taxonomic history. Although the family was generally associated with the superfamily Libelluloidea, its precise placement remained uncertain for many years, and the genus Pseudocordulia had been considered as incertae sedis within Libelluloidea.

Molecular and morphological analyses published in 2025 helped to resolve this uncertainty. These studies supported Pseudocorduliidae as a distinct lineage within Libelluloidea and provided a clearer framework for the family’s composition.

The genus, Pseudocordulia, is now treated within the family, Pseudocorduliidae, in the current World Odonata List (2025).

== Etymology ==
The family name Pseudocorduliidae is derived from the type genus Pseudocordulia, with the standard zoological suffix -idae used for animal families.

The genus name Pseudocordulia is derived from the Greek ψευδής (pseudēs, "false" or "deceptive") combined with Cordulia, the name of a related genus, indicating that it is not a true member of that genus.
