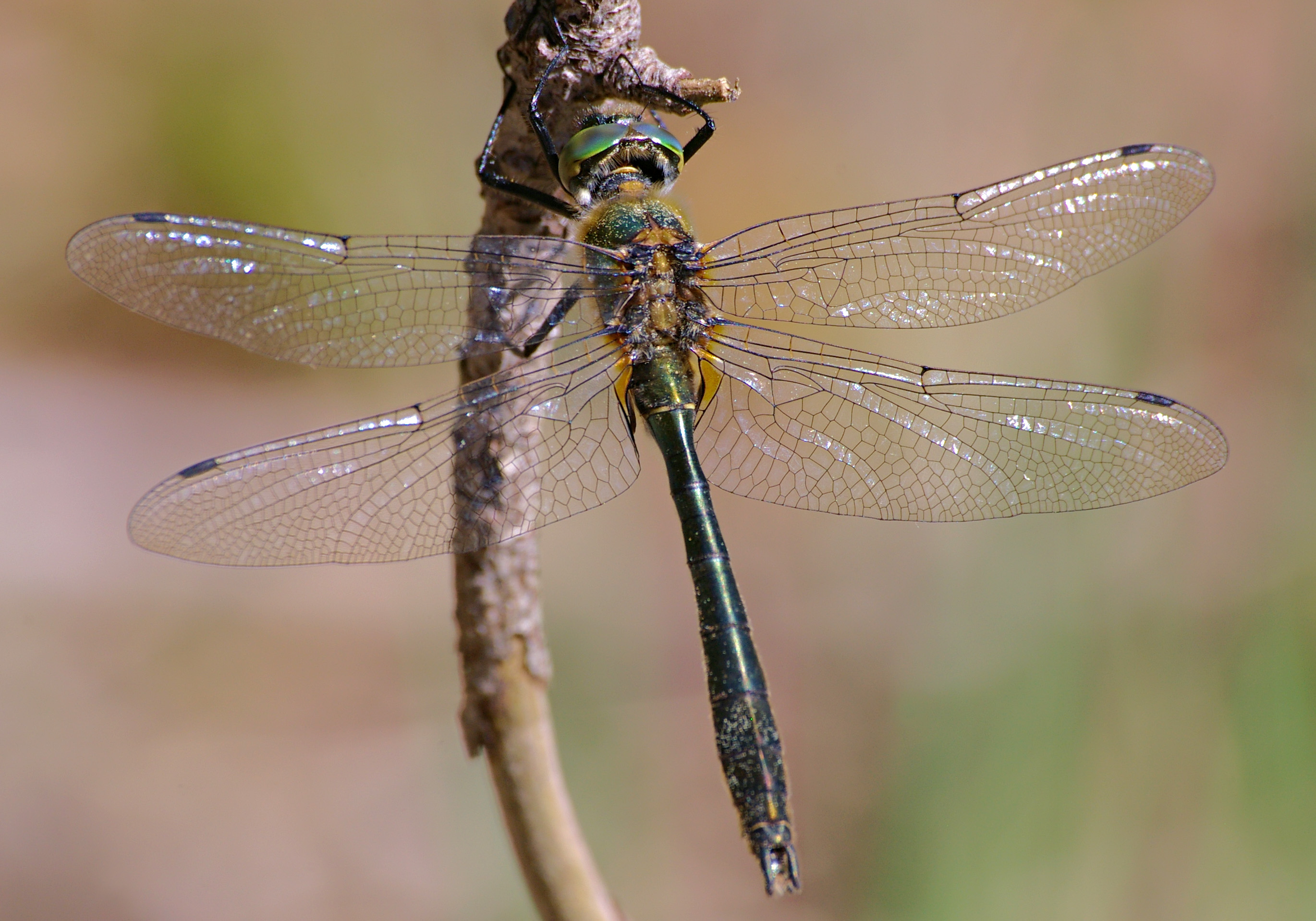
- Downy Emerald

Scientific classification
- Kingdom: Animalia
- Phylum: Arthropoda
- Clade: Pancrustacea
- Class: Insecta
- Order: Odonata
- Infraorder: Anisoptera
- Family: Corduliidae
- Subfamily: Corduliinae
- Genus: Cordulia; Leach, 1815

= Cordulia =

Genus of dragonflies

Cordulia is a genus of dragonfly in the family Corduliidae.

== Species ==
The genus includes two species:

Image	Scientific name	Common name	Distribution
	Cordulia aenea (Linnaeus, 1758)	downy emerald	Great Britain
	Cordulia shurtleffii Scudder, 1866	American emerald	North America.

== Etymology ==
The genus name Cordulia is derived from the Greek κορδύλη (kordylē, "club" or "cudgel"), referring to the shape of the male abdomen.
