= Austropetalia annaliese =

Northern redspot

Conservation status
- Data Deficient (IUCN 3.1)

Scientific classification
- Kingdom: Animalia
- Phylum: Arthropoda
- Clade: Pancrustacea
- Class: Insecta
- Order: Odonata
- Suborder: Anisoptera
- Family: Austropetaliidae
- Genus: Austropetalia
- Species: A. annaliese

Binomial name
- Austropetalia annaliese Theischinger, 2013

Species of dragonfly

Austropetalia annaliese is a species of dragonfly of the family Austropetaliidae, known as the northern redspot. It is endemic to mountain areas of north-eastern New South Wales, Australia, where sphagnum moss is abundant. It is a medium-sized dragonfly with brown and yellow markings, the female being similar to both Austropetalia patricia and Austropetalia tonyana.

== Etymology ==
The genus name Austropetalia combines the prefix austro- (from Latin auster, meaning “south wind”, hence “southern”) with Petalia, a genus name derived from Greek πέταλον (petalon, “petal”).

In 2013, Günther Theischinger named this species annaliese, an eponym honouring his granddaughter, Annaliese.

== See also ==
- List of Odonata species of Australia
