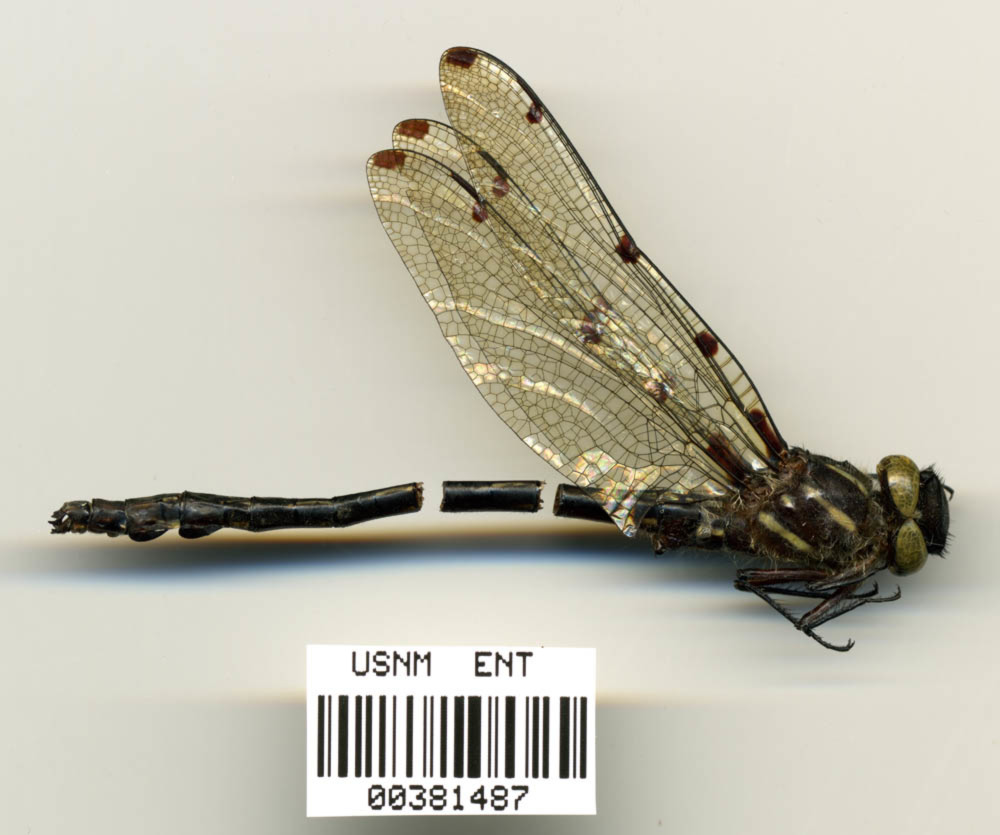

Conservation status
- Vulnerable (IUCN 3.1)

Scientific classification
- Kingdom: Animalia
- Phylum: Arthropoda
- Clade: Pancrustacea
- Class: Insecta
- Order: Odonata
- Infraorder: Anisoptera
- Family: Austropetaliidae
- Genus: Phyllopetalia
- Species: P. excrescens

Binomial name
- Phyllopetalia excrescens (Carle, 1996)

= Phyllopetalia excrescens =

Species of dragonfly

Phyllopetalia excrescens is a species of dragonfly in the family Austropetaliidae. It is endemic to Chile. Its natural habitats are intermittent rivers and freshwater springs. It is threatened by habitat loss.
