= Phyllopetalia stictica =

Conservation status
- Data Deficient (IUCN 3.1)

Scientific classification
- Kingdom: Animalia
- Phylum: Arthropoda
- Clade: Pancrustacea
- Class: Insecta
- Order: Odonata
- Infraorder: Anisoptera
- Family: Austropetaliidae
- Genus: Phyllopetalia
- Species: P. stictica

Binomial name
- Phyllopetalia stictica Hagen in Selys, 1858

Species of dragonfly

Phyllopetalia stictica is a species of dragonfly in the family Austropetaliidae. It is endemic to Chile. Its natural habitat is rivers. It is threatened by habitat loss.
