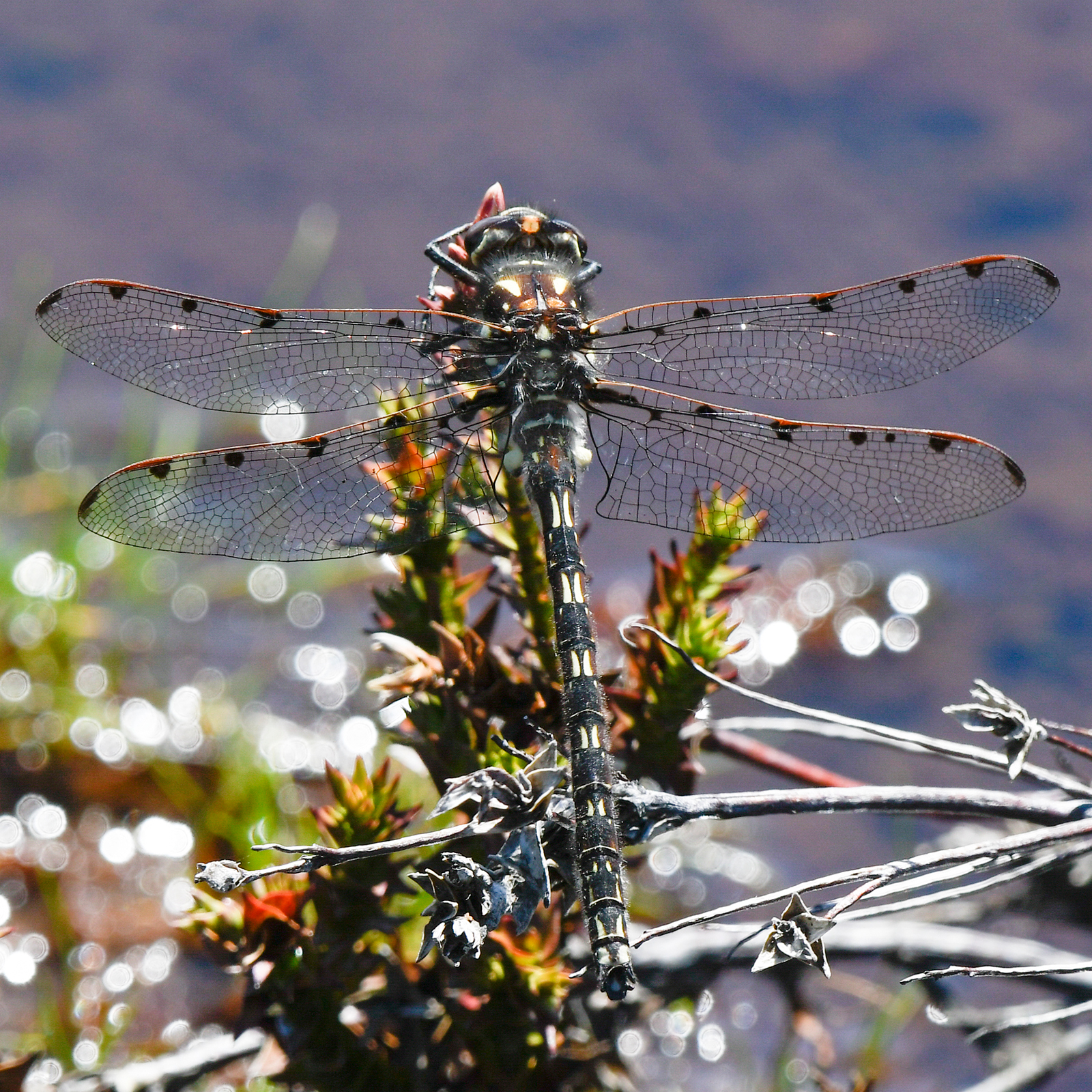
- Male
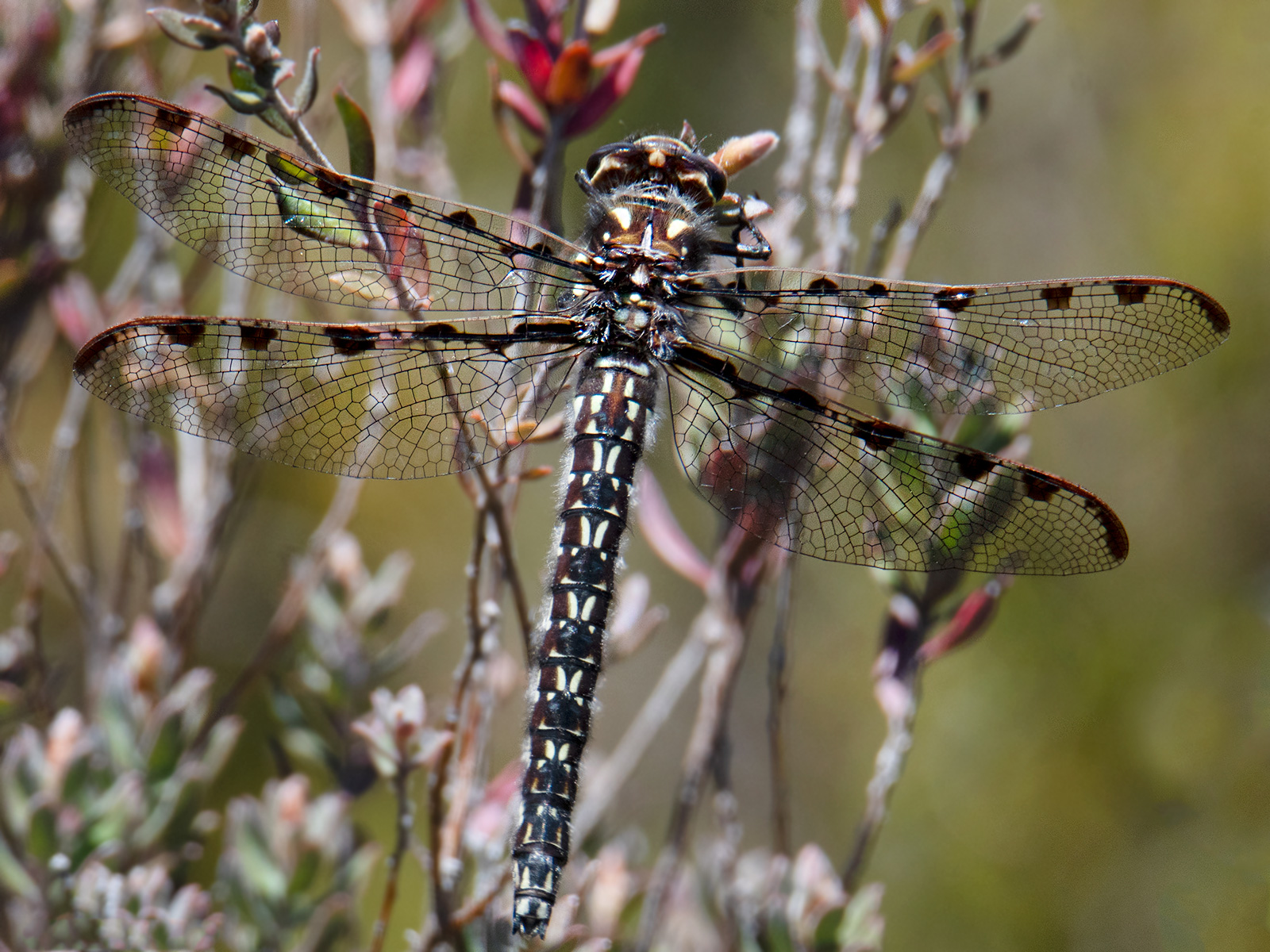
- Female

Conservation status
- Least Concern (IUCN 3.1)

Scientific classification
- Kingdom: Animalia
- Phylum: Arthropoda
- Clade: Pancrustacea
- Class: Insecta
- Order: Odonata
- Suborder: Anisoptera
- Family: Austropetaliidae
- Genus: Archipetalia; Tillyard, 1917
- Species: A. auriculata

Binomial name
- Archipetalia auriculata Tillyard, 1917

= Archipetalia =

Tasmanian redspot

Genus of dragonflies

Archipetalia is a monotypic genus of Australian dragonflies in the family Austropetaliidae, The only known species of this genus is Archipetalia auriculata, known as a Tasmanian redspot.

Archipetalia auriculata is a medium-sized and hairy dragonfly, with brown and yellow markings. It is endemic to Tasmania, Australia, where it inhabits streams and seepages.

== Etymology ==
The genus name Archipetalia is derived from the Greek ἀρχαῖος (arkhaios, "ancient") and πέταλον (petalon, "leaf" or "petal"), referring to what was considered the most archaic aeshnine dragonfly then known, and to the leaf-like appendages of the male.

The species name auriculata is derived from the Latin auricula ("little ear" or "ear-shaped lobe"), referring to the large brown and yellow protrusions at the base of the abdomen.

== Gallery ==
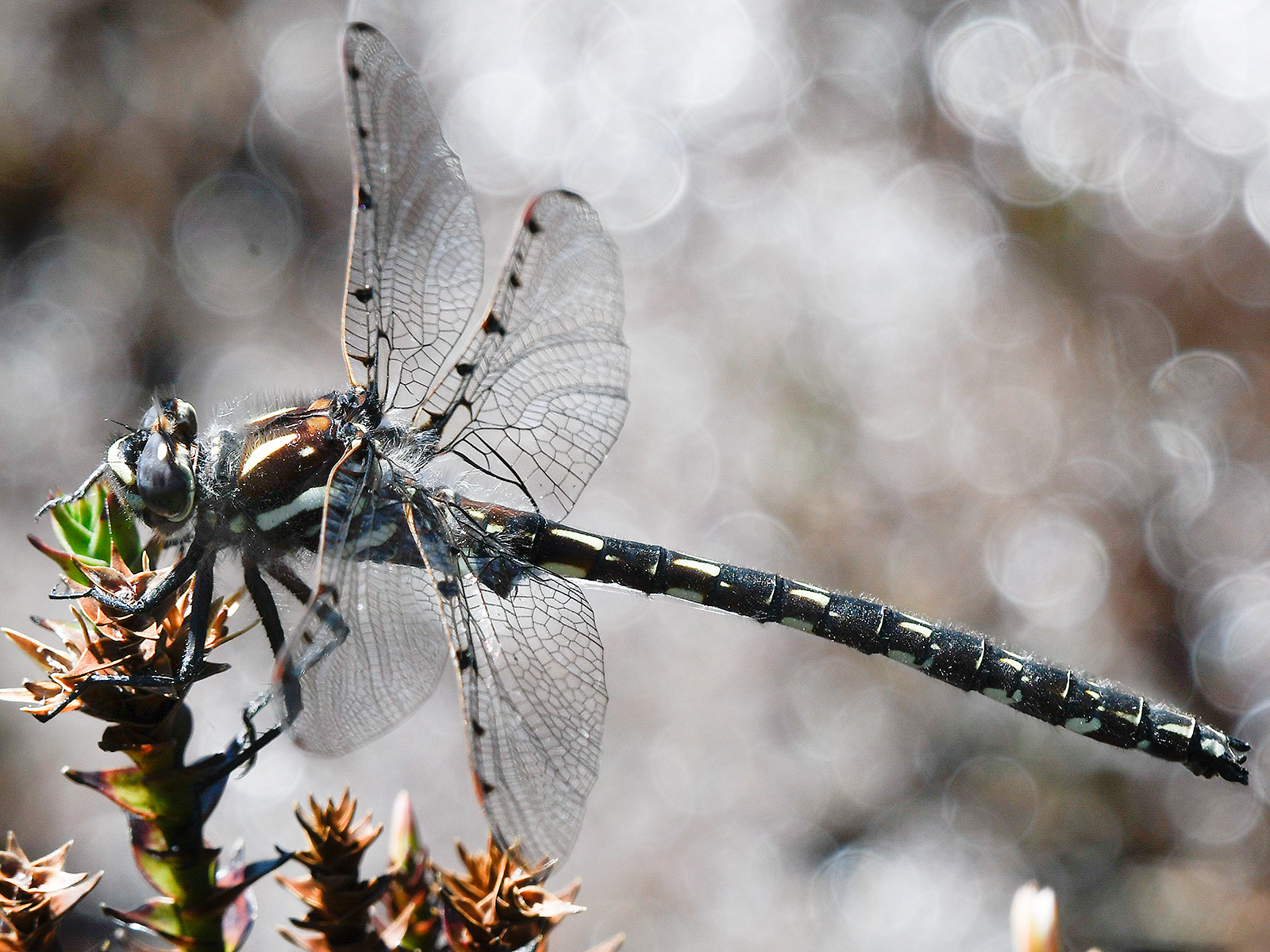
Male

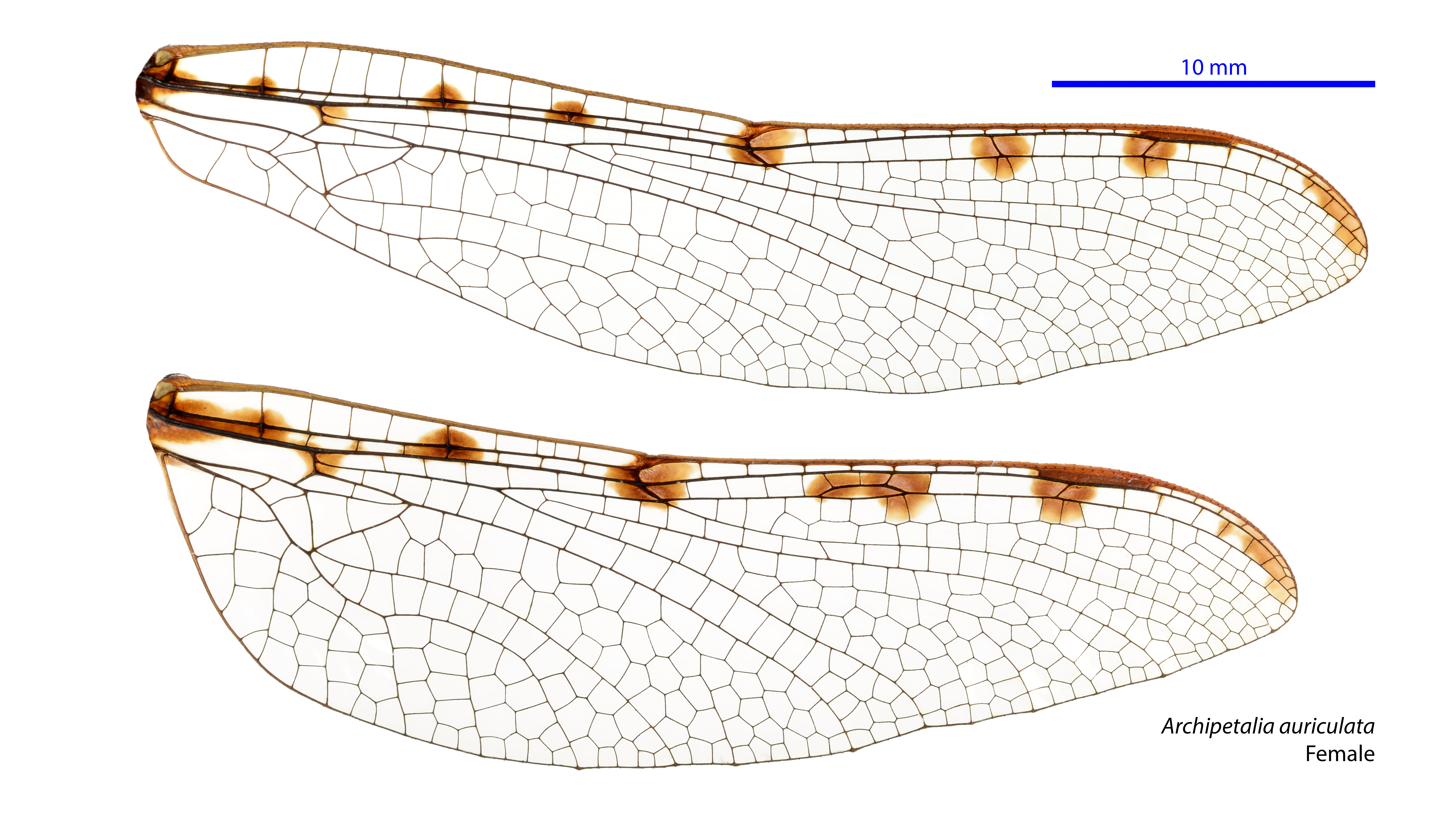
Female Archipetalia auriculata wings

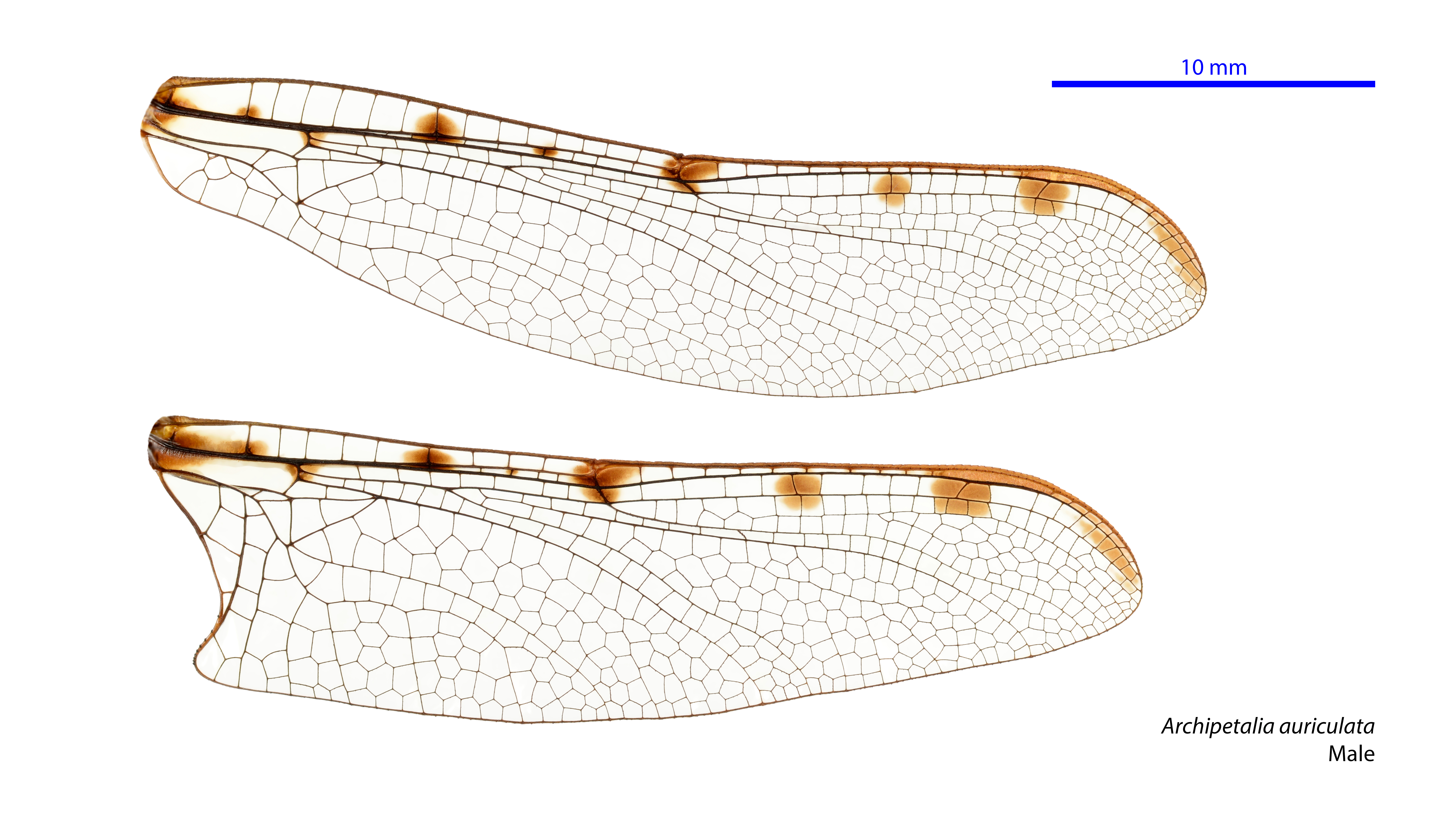
Male Archipetalia auriculata wings

== See also ==
- List of Odonata species of Australia
