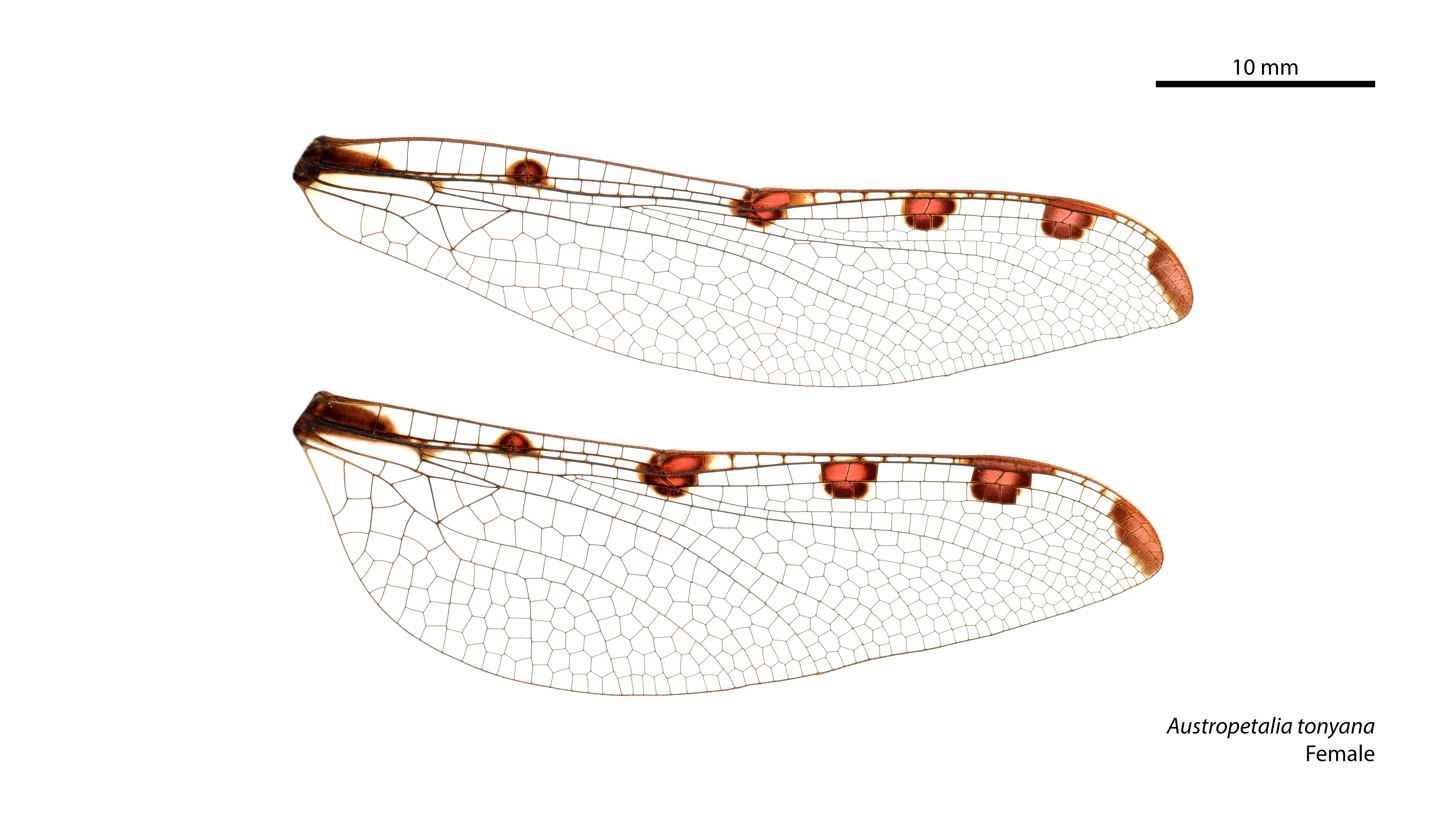
- Austropetalia have distinctive wing spots

Scientific classification
- Kingdom: Animalia
- Phylum: Arthropoda
- Clade: Pancrustacea
- Class: Insecta
- Order: Odonata
- Suborder: Anisoptera
- Family: Austropetaliidae
- Genus: Austropetalia; Tillyard, 1916

= Austropetalia =

Genus of dragonflies

Austropetalia is a genus of dragonflies in the family Austropetaliidae, endemic to south-eastern Australia. Species of Austropetalia are medium-sized to large dragonflies with brown and yellow markings.

== Species ==
The genus Austropetalia includes the following species:

- Austropetalia annaliese Theischinger, 2013
- Austropetalia patricia (Tillyard, 1910) - Waterfall redspot
- Austropetalia tonyana Theischinger, 1995 - Alpine redspot

== Etymology ==
The genus name Austropetalia combines the prefix austro- (from Latin auster, meaning “south wind”, hence “southern”) with Petalia, a genus name derived from Greek πέταλον (petalon, “petal”). The name refers to an Australian representative of that group, in contrast to related genera from South America.

== See also ==
- List of dragonflies of Australia
