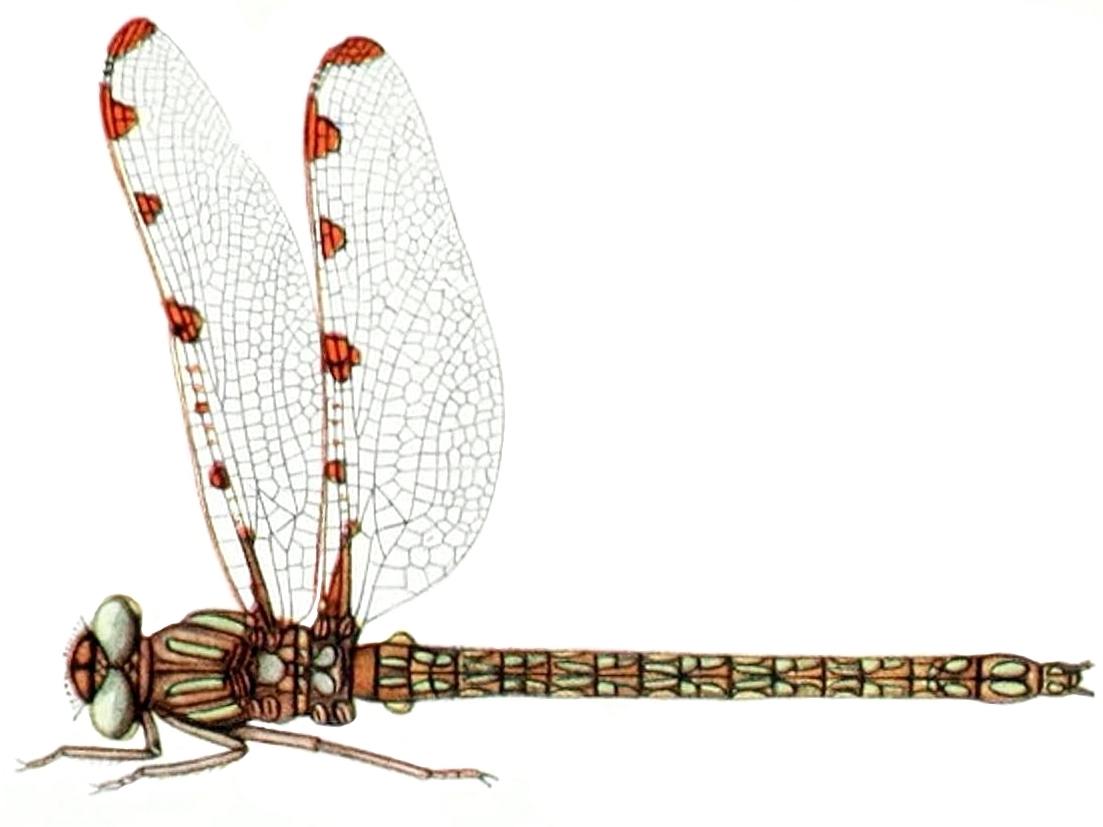

Scientific classification
- Kingdom: Animalia
- Phylum: Arthropoda
- Clade: Pancrustacea
- Class: Insecta
- Order: Odonata
- Suborder: Anisoptera
- Family: Austropetaliidae
- Genus: Austropetalia
- Species: A. patricia

Binomial name
- Austropetalia patricia (Tillyard, 1910)

Synonyms
- Phyllopetalia patricia Tillyard, 1910

= Austropetalia patricia =

Waterfall redspot

Species of dragonfly

Austropetalia patricia is a species of dragonfly of the family Austropetaliidae, commonly known as the waterfall redspot. It is endemic to eastern New South Wales, Australia, where it inhabits mountain streams. It is a medium-sized dragonfly with brown and yellow markings.

== Etymology ==
The genus name Austropetalia combines the prefix austro- (from Latin auster, meaning “south wind”, hence “southern”) with Petalia, a genus name derived from Greek πέταλον (petalon, “petal”).

In 1910, Robin Tillyard named this species patricia, an eponym honouring his wife.

== Gallery ==
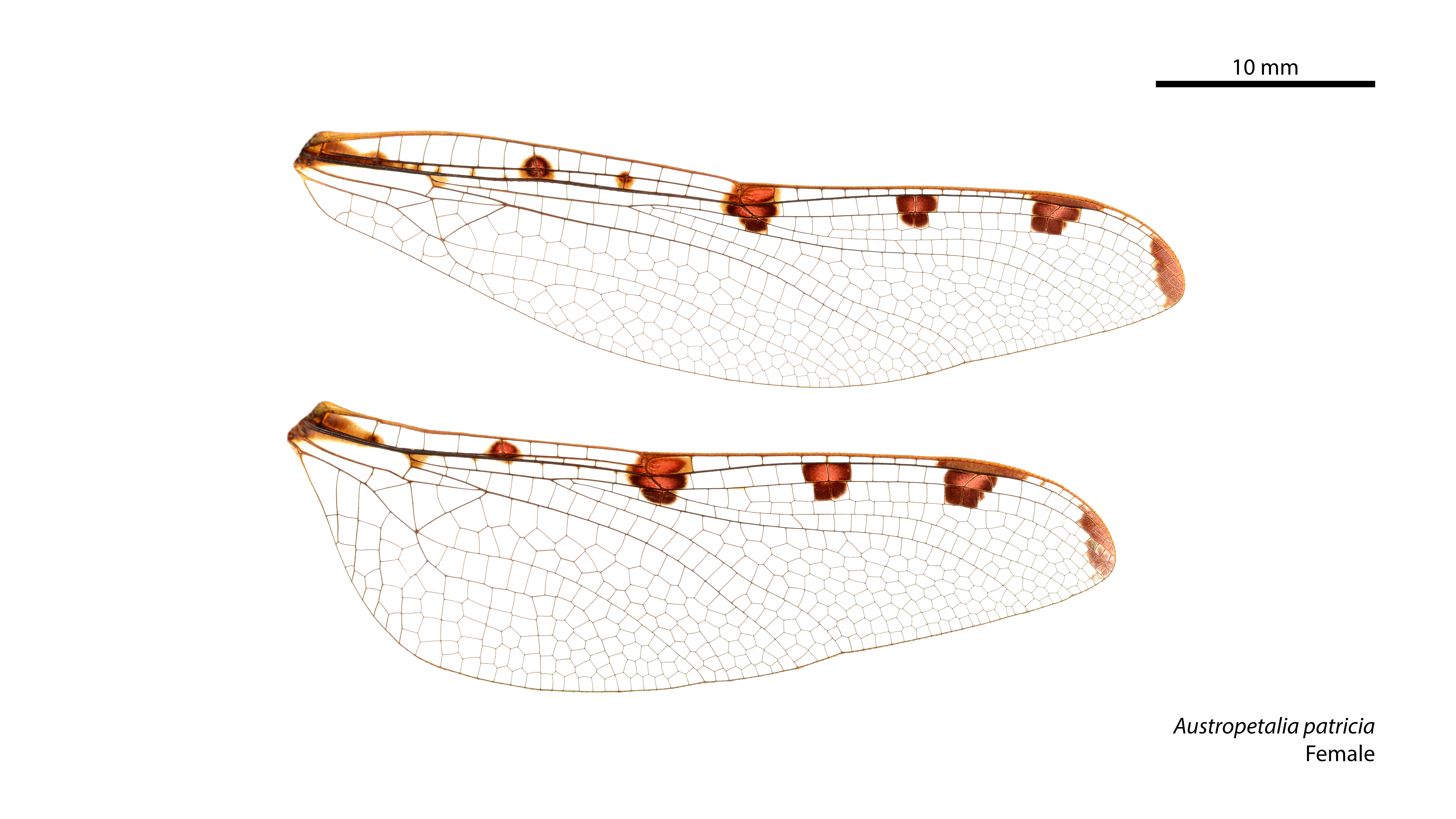
Female wings

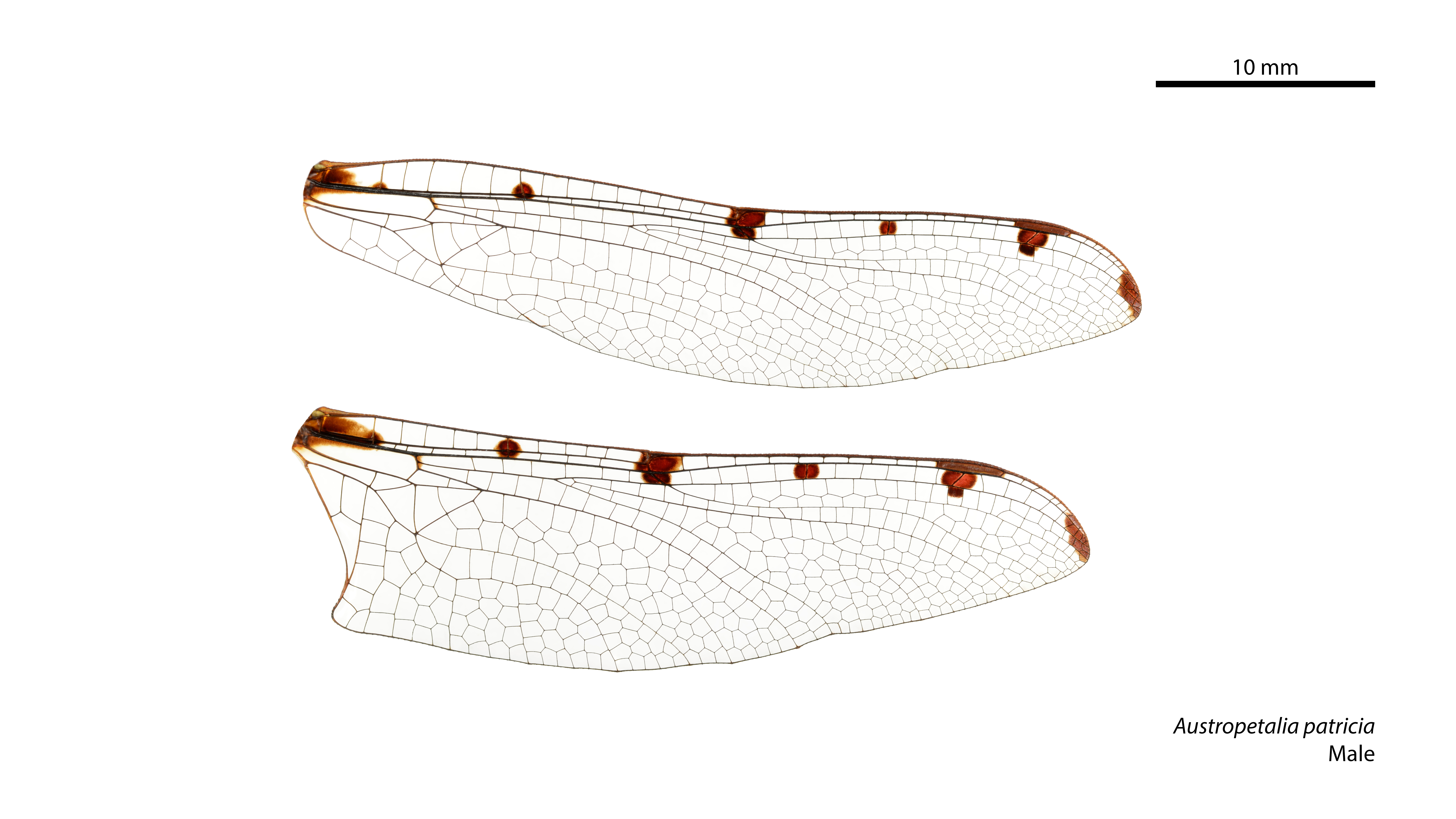
Male wings

== See also ==
- List of Odonata species of Australia
