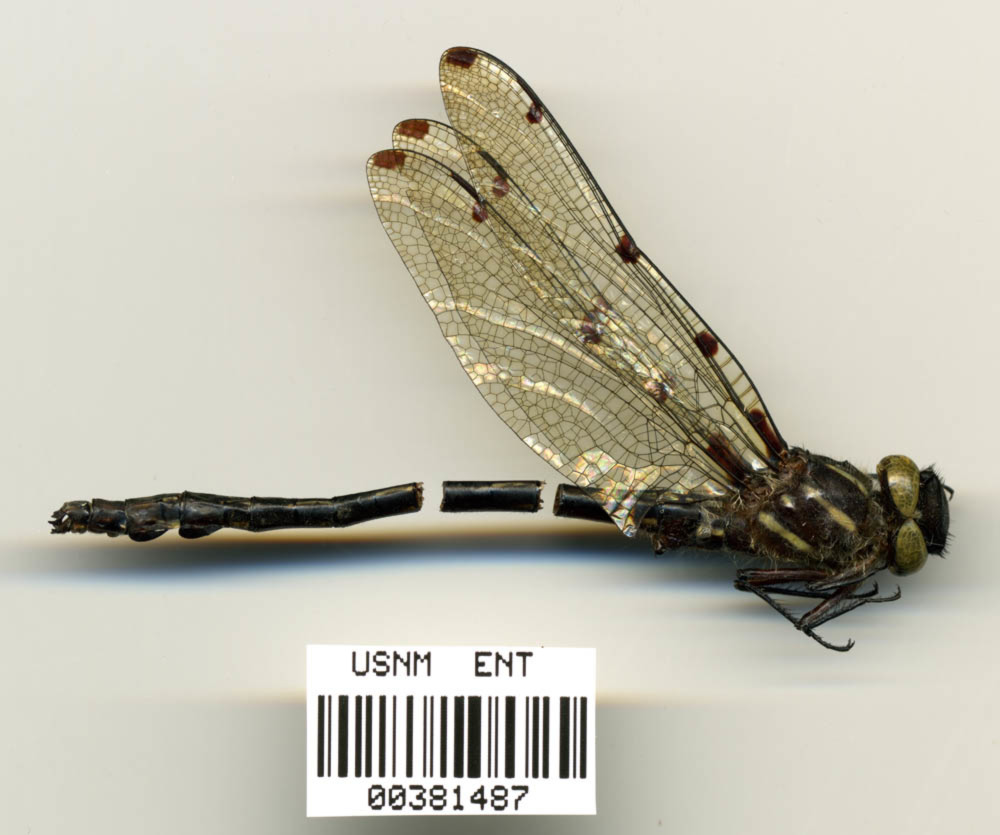
- Phyllopetalia excrescens

Scientific classification
- Kingdom: Animalia
- Phylum: Arthropoda
- Clade: Pancrustacea
- Class: Insecta
- Order: Odonata
- Infraorder: Anisoptera
- Family: Austropetaliidae
- Genus: Phyllopetalia; Selys, 1858

Type species
- Phyllopetalia stictica Hagen in Selys, 1858

Synonyms
- Rheopetalia Carle, 1996; Odontopetalia Carle, 1996; Eurypetalia Carle, 1996; Ophiopetalia Carle, 1996

= Phyllopetalia =

Genus of dragonflies

Phyllopetalia is a genus of dragonflies in the family Austropetaliidae. They are commonly known as redspots.

All the species are endemic to Chile except for P. pudu which also occurs in Argentina.

The genus contains the following species:

- Phyllopetalia altarensis (Carle, 1996) - Metropolitan Redspot
- Phyllopetalia apicalis Selys, 1858 - Narrow-flanged Redspot
- Phyllopetalia apollo Selys, 1878 - Apollo Redspot
- Phyllopetalia excrescens (Carle, 1996) - Peaked Redspot
- Phyllopetalia pudu Dunkle, 1985 - Pudu Redspot
- Phyllopetalia stictica Hagen in Selys, 1858 - Unicorn Redspot
