= Hypopetalia =

Hypopetalia pestilens

Conservation status
- Least Concern (IUCN 3.1)

Scientific classification
- Kingdom: Animalia
- Phylum: Arthropoda
- Clade: Pancrustacea
- Class: Insecta
- Order: Odonata
- Infraorder: Anisoptera
- Family: Austropetaliidae
- Genus: Hypopetalia; McLachlan, 1870
- Species: H. pestilens

Binomial name
- Hypopetalia pestilens McLachlan, 1870

Species of dragonfly

Hypopetalia pestilens, the white-dotted redspot, is a monotypic species of dragonfly in the family Austropetaliidae. It is endemic to central Chile. Its natural habitat is rivers. It is threatened by habitat loss.

== Sources ==
- von Ellenrieder, N. & Paulson, D. (2006). "Hypopetalia pestilens". IUCN Red List of Threatened Species. 2006 e.T60259A12317026. doi:10.2305/IUCN.UK.2006.RLTS.T60259A12317026.en.
- Martin Schorr; Martin Lindeboom; Dennis Paulson. "World Odonata List". University of Puget Sound.
