= Austropetalia tonyana =

Alpine redspot

Conservation status
- Near Threatened (IUCN 3.1)

Scientific classification
- Kingdom: Animalia
- Phylum: Arthropoda
- Clade: Pancrustacea
- Class: Insecta
- Order: Odonata
- Suborder: Anisoptera
- Family: Austropetaliidae
- Genus: Austropetalia
- Species: A. tonyana

Binomial name
- Austropetalia tonyana Theischinger, 1995

Synonyms
- Austropetalia victoria Carle, 1996

Species of dragonfly

Austropetalia tonyana is a species of dragonfly of the family Austropetaliidae, commonly known as the alpine redspot. It is endemic to mountain areas of Victoria and New South Wales, Australia, where it inhabits trickles, sphagnum moss swamps and waterfall splash zones. It is a medium-sized dragonfly with brown and yellow markings.

== Etymology ==
The genus name Austropetalia combines the prefix austro- (from Latin auster, meaning “south wind”, hence “southern”) with Petalia, a genus name derived from Greek πέταλον (petalon, “petal”).

In 1995, Theischinger named this species tonyana, an eponym honouring his friend and fellow odonatologist, the late Dr J.A.L. (Tony) Watson (1935–1993).

== Gallery ==
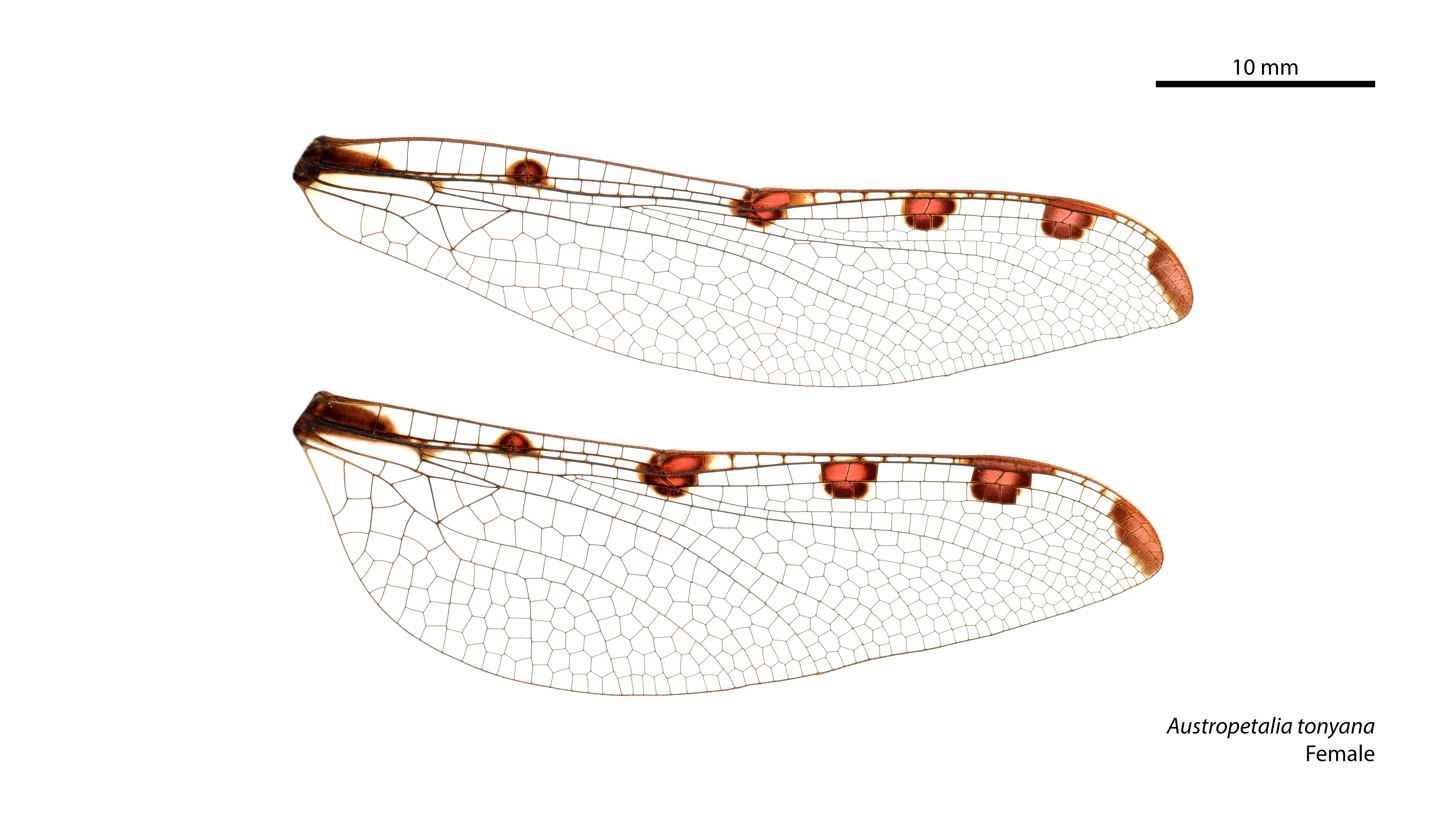
Female wings

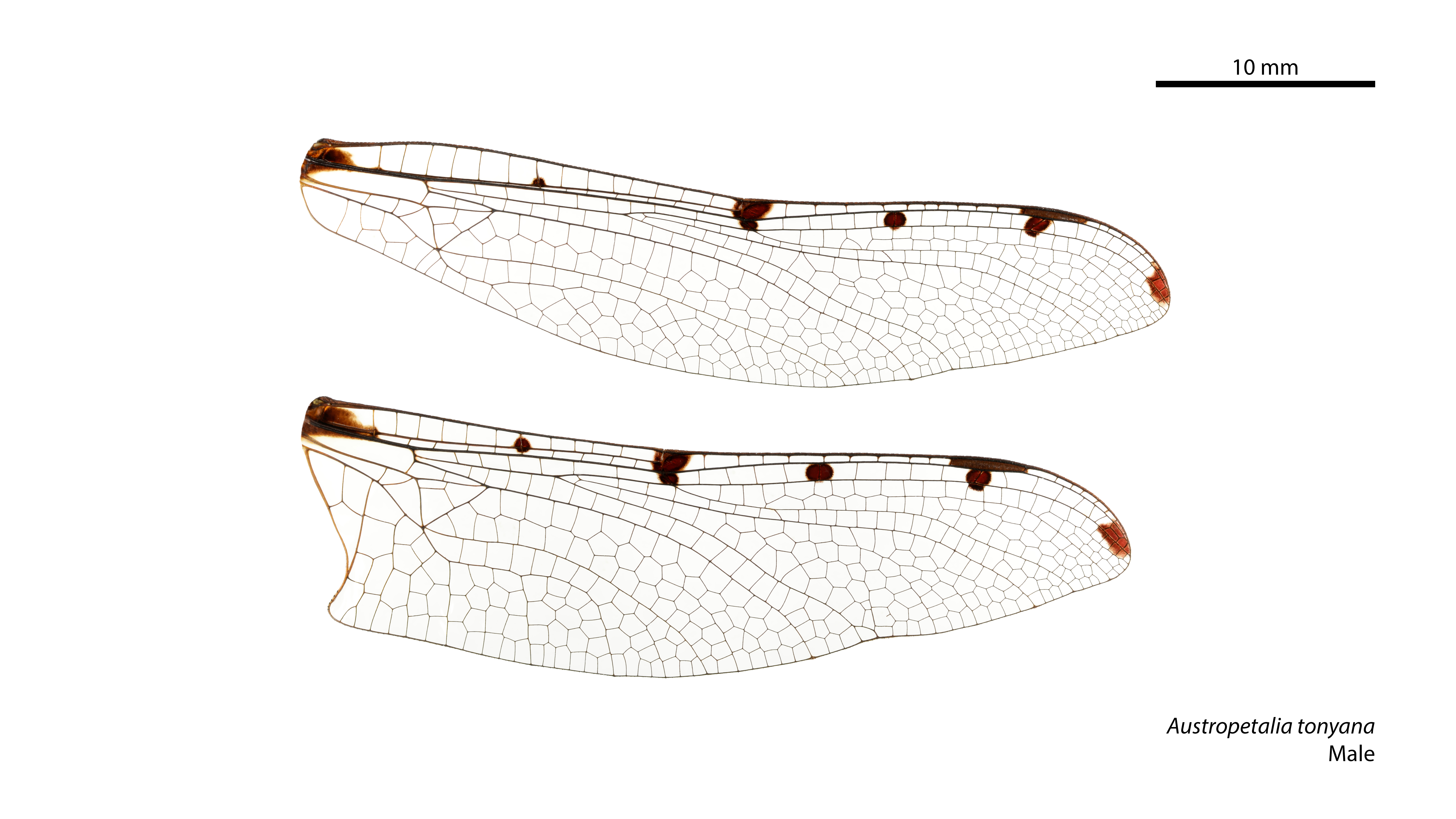
Male wings

== See also ==
- List of Odonata species of Australia
