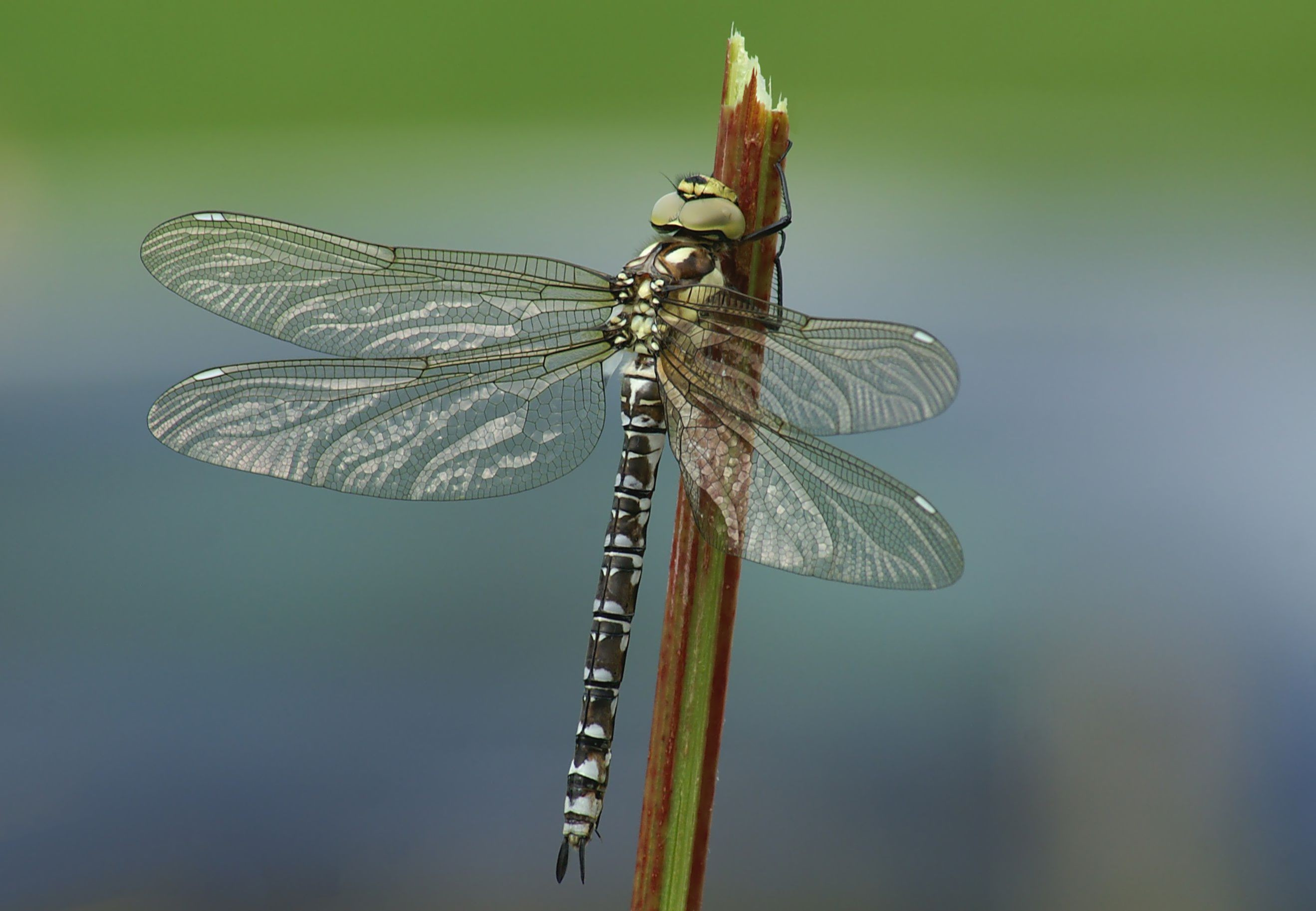
- Southern hawker (Aeshna cyanea)

Scientific classification
- Kingdom: Animalia
- Phylum: Arthropoda
- Clade: Pancrustacea
- Class: Insecta
- Order: Odonata
- Suborder: Anisoptera
- Superfamily: Aeshnoidea; Leach, 1815

Families
- Aeshnidae; Austropetaliidae
- Distribution of Aeshnoidea

= Aeshnoidea =

Aeshnoidea Temporal range: Middle Jurassic (Bathonian) to present

Superfamily of dragonflies

Aeshnoidea is a superfamily of dragonflies comprising the families Aeshnidae and Austropetaliidae.

The superfamily also includes numerous extinct lineages known from Jurassic and Cretaceous fossils.

== Taxonomic history ==
The family-group name Aeshnoidea is attributed to Leach, 1815.

Modern classifications recognise two extant families within the superfamily: Aeshnidae and Austropetaliidae.

In 2016, Kohli and colleagues referred to the clade comprising Aeshnidae and Austropetaliidae as Aeshnoidea, while noting that it had been called Aeshnoptera by Bechly and colleagues.

== Taxonomic history ==
The superfamily Aeshnoidea was established by Leach in 1815.

Modern classifications recognise two extant families within the superfamily: Aeshnidae and Austropetaliidae.

The fossil clade Aeshnoptera, proposed by Bechly in 1996, broadly corresponds to Aeshnoidea and several extinct stem groups.

== Phylogeny ==
Phylogenetic studies support Aeshnoidea as a monophyletic group comprising Aeshnidae and Austropetaliidae.

Within modern dragonflies, Aeshnoidea is generally recovered as the sister group to the remaining extant Anisoptera.

- Anisoptera
  - Aeshnoidea
  - Other dragonflies

== Families ==
The following families are currently placed in Aeshnoidea:

- Aeshnidae Leach, 1815
- Austropetaliidae Carle & Louton, 1994

== Fossil families ==
The superfamily includes numerous extinct families known from Jurassic and Cretaceous deposits, including:

- †Cymatophlebiidae Handlirsch, 1906
- †Eumorbaeschnidae Bechly et al., 2001
- †Liupanshaniidae Bechly et al., 2001
- †Mesuropetalidae Bechly, 1996
- †Paracymatophlebiidae Bechly et al., 2001
- †Progobiaeshnidae Bechly, Nel, Martínez-Delclòs et al., 2001
- †Rudiaeschnidae Bechly et al., 2001

Additional extinct families closely related to modern aeshnoids include:

- †Burmaeshnidae Huang et al., 2017
- †Enigmaeshnidae Nel et al., 2008
- †Libanoaeshnidae Azar, Maksoud, Abi-Saad & Nel, 2024
- †Primumaeshnidae Pouillon & Nel, 2020

== Fossil record ==
The oldest known crown-group dragonflies are the paracymatophlebiid †Sinocymatophlebia and the indeterminate aeshnoid †Propecymatophlebia, known from the Middle Jurassic of China.

== Etymology ==
The superfamily name Aeshnoidea is derived from the type genus Aeshna and the zoological suffix -oidea, used for superfamilies.

The origin of the genus name Aeshna is uncertain, but it may derive from the Greek αἰσχύνω (aischynō, "to disfigure" or "to tarnish"), possibly through a transcription error.

== See also ==
- List of dragonflies of the world
