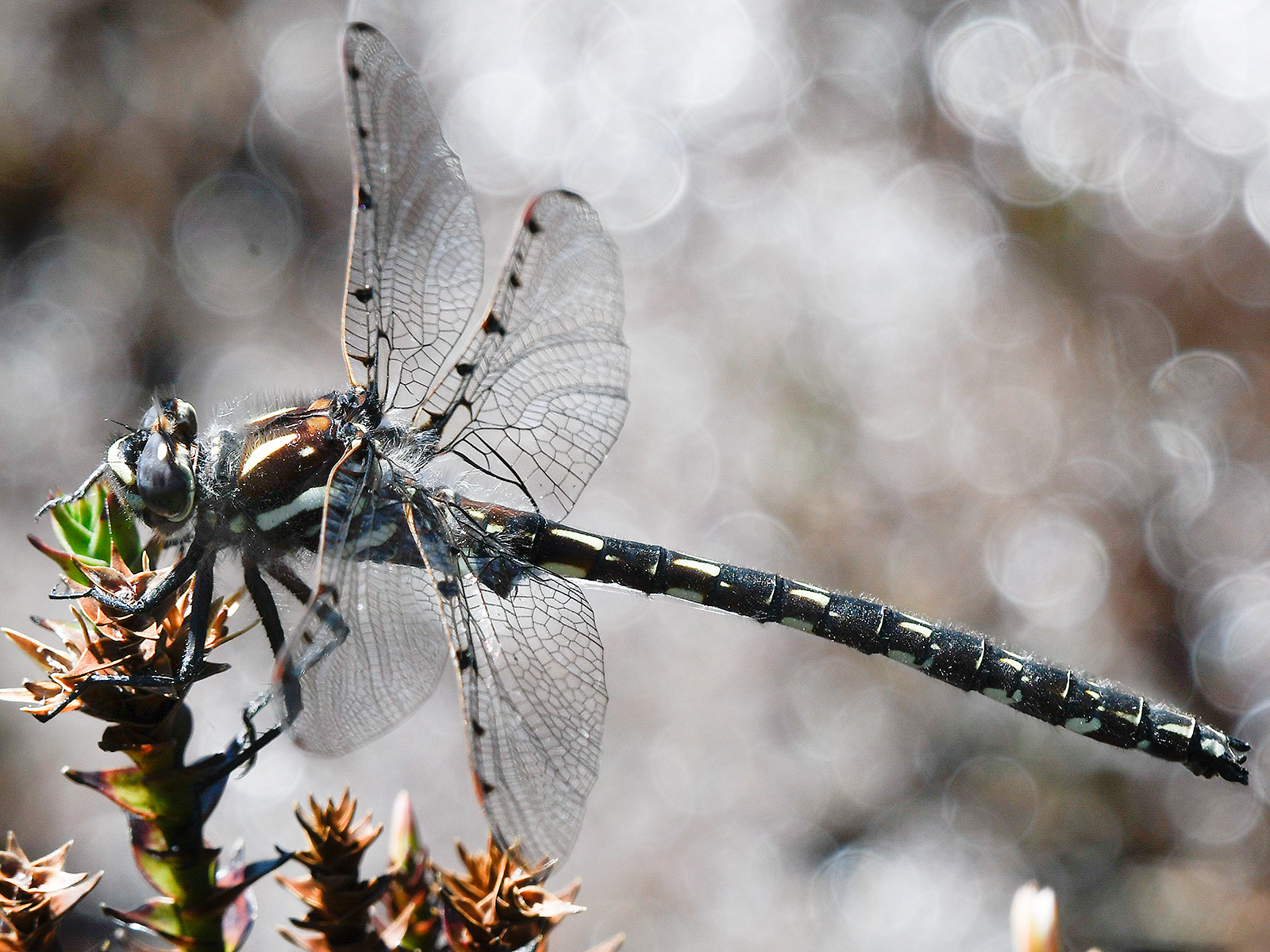
- Archipetalia auriculata

Scientific classification
- Kingdom: Animalia
- Phylum: Arthropoda
- Clade: Pancrustacea
- Class: Insecta
- Order: Odonata
- Infraorder: Anisoptera
- Superfamily: Aeshnoidea
- Family: Austropetaliidae; Carle & Louton, 1994

Genera
- Archipetalia; Austropetalia; Hypopetalia; Phyllopetalia
- Distribution of Austropetaliidae

= Austropetaliidae =

Family of dragonflies

Austropetaliidae is a small family of dragonflies occurring in Chile, Argentina and Australia. Members of Austropetaliidae can be medium-sized to large dragonflies.

== Genera ==
The family includes the following genera:

- Archipetalia Tillyard, 1917
- Austropetalia Tillyard, 1916
- Hypopetalia McLachlan, 1870
- Phyllopetalia Selys, 1858

== Taxonomy ==
This group was initially created for some archaic members of the family Neopetaliidae and was promoted to family rank in 1994.

Bechly (1996) placed the genus Archipetalia in its own family, Archipetaliidae. However, this arrangement has not been widely followed, and later authors have kept Archipetalia within Austropetaliidae.

== Etymology ==
The family name Austropetaliidae is derived from the type genus Austropetalia, with the standard zoological suffix -idae used for animal families. The genus name Austropetalia combines austro- (from Latin auster, “south wind”, hence “southern”) with Petalia, a genus name derived from Greek πέταλον (petalon, “petal”).
