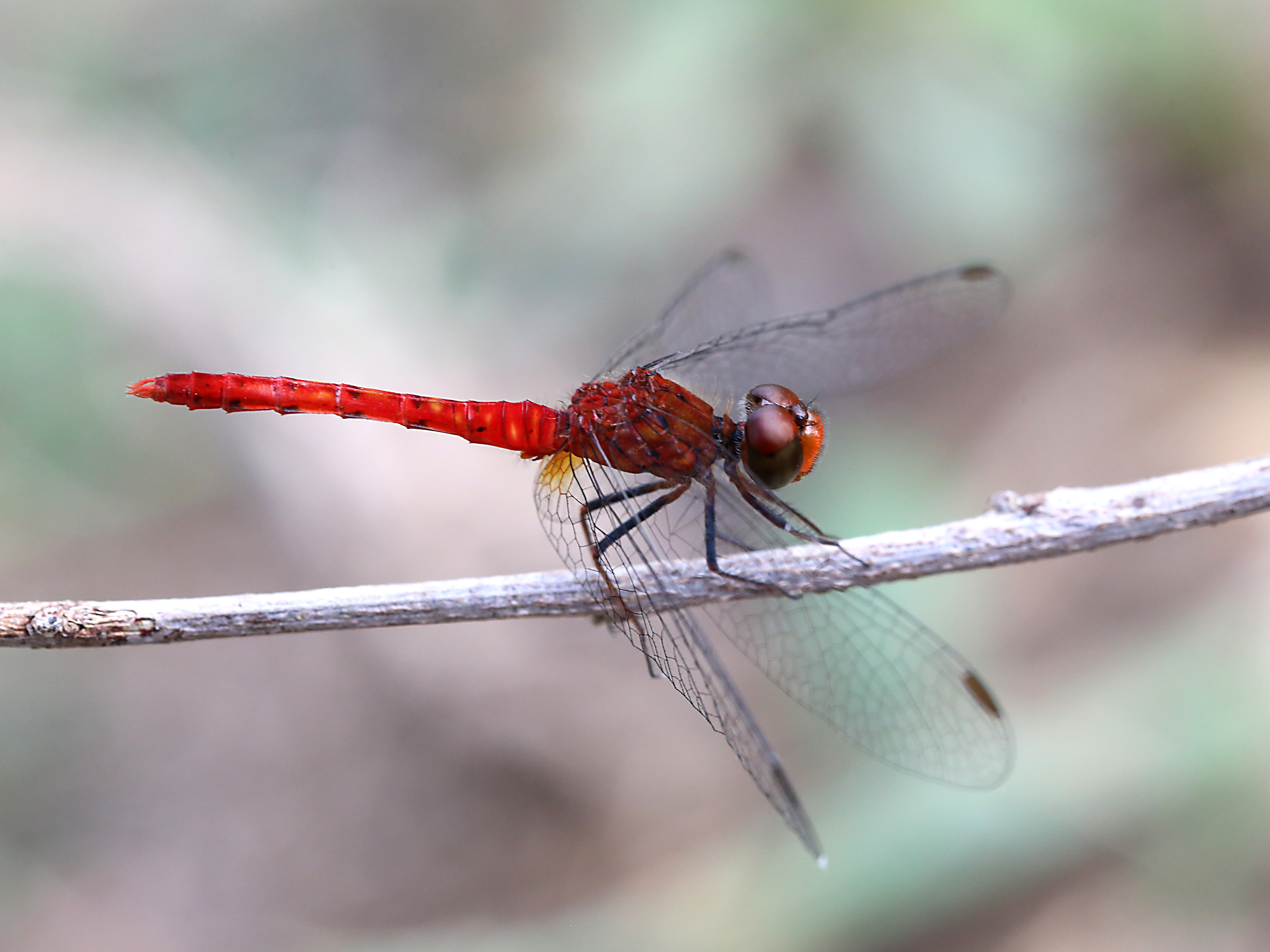
- Male, Queensland
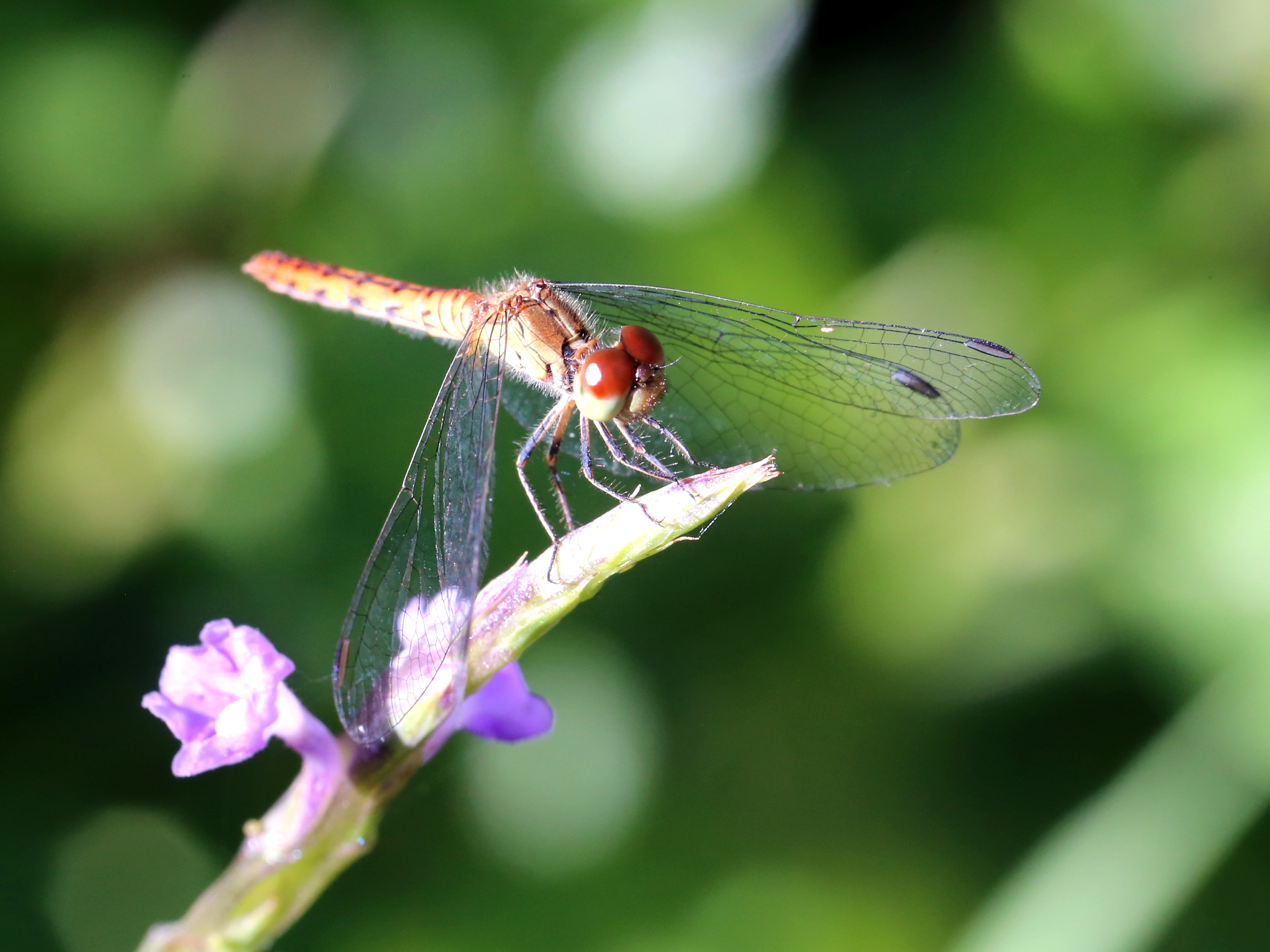
- Female, Queensland

Conservation status
- Least Concern (IUCN 3.1)

Scientific classification
- Kingdom: Animalia
- Phylum: Arthropoda
- Clade: Pancrustacea
- Class: Insecta
- Order: Odonata
- Infraorder: Anisoptera
- Family: Libellulidae
- Genus: Nannodiplax; Brauer, 1868
- Species: N. rubra

Binomial name
- Nannodiplax rubra Brauer, 1868

= Nannodiplax rubra =

Species of dragonfly

Nannodiplax rubra, commonly called the pygmy percher, is a species of dragonfly in the monotypic genus Nannodiplax. Its distribution seems to be limited to Australia and New Guinea. They are tiny dragonflies (wingspan 40 mm, length 25 mm) with a bright red abdomen and clear wings. They are found near a wide variety of rivers and streams. The Australian distribution ranges from Broome, Western Australia via the north and east to around Coffs Harbour, New South Wales. The taxon has not yet been assessed for the IUCN Red List, but it is listed in the Catalogue of Life.

== Etymology ==
The genus name Nannodiplax combines the Greek νάννος (nannos, "dwarf") with Diplax, a genus name derived from the Greek δίς (dis, "twice") and πλάξ (plax, "flat and broad"). The name probably refers to the small size of members of the genus.

The species name rubra is derived from the Latin ruber ("red"), referring to the colour of the abdomen.

== Gallery ==
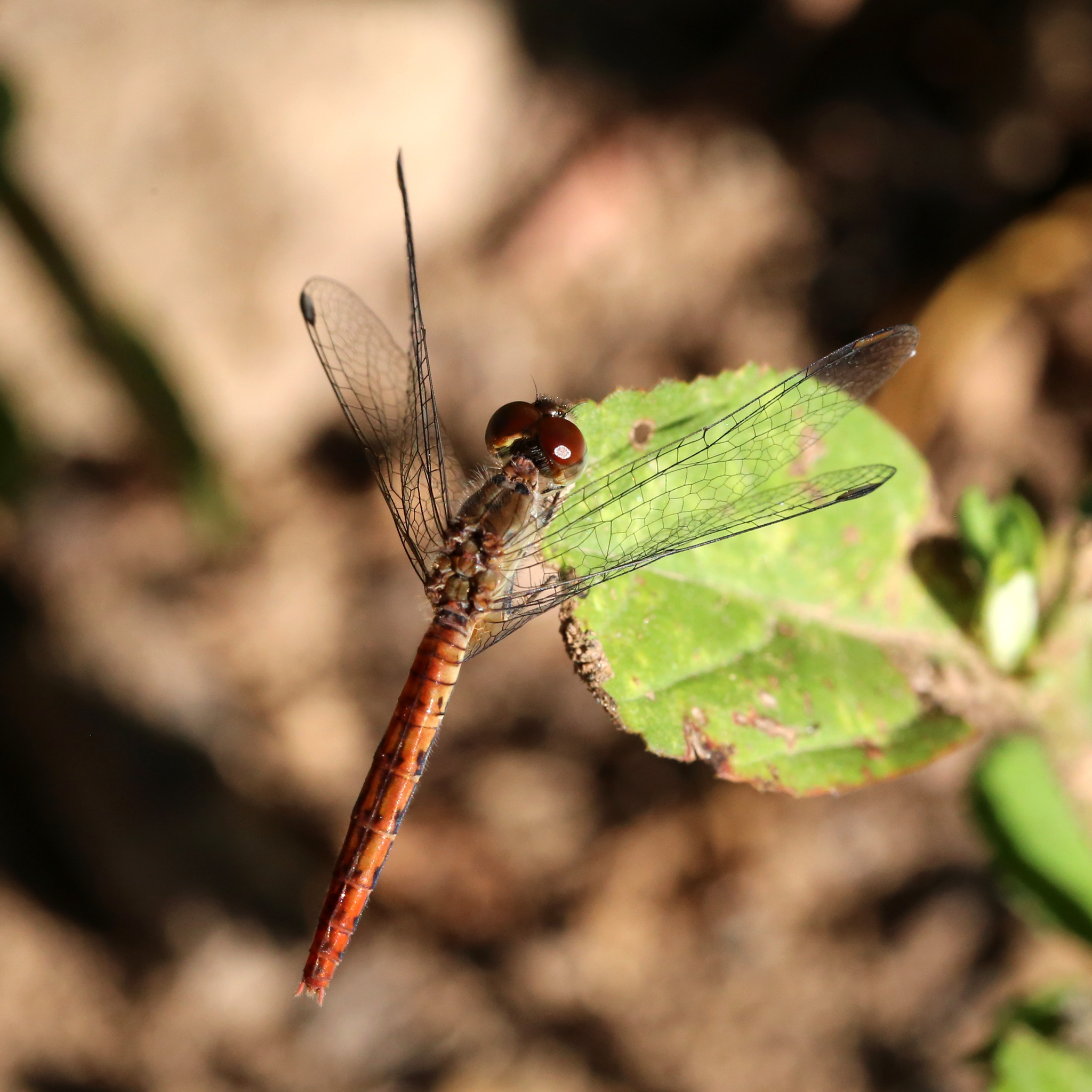
Female showing her adult colours

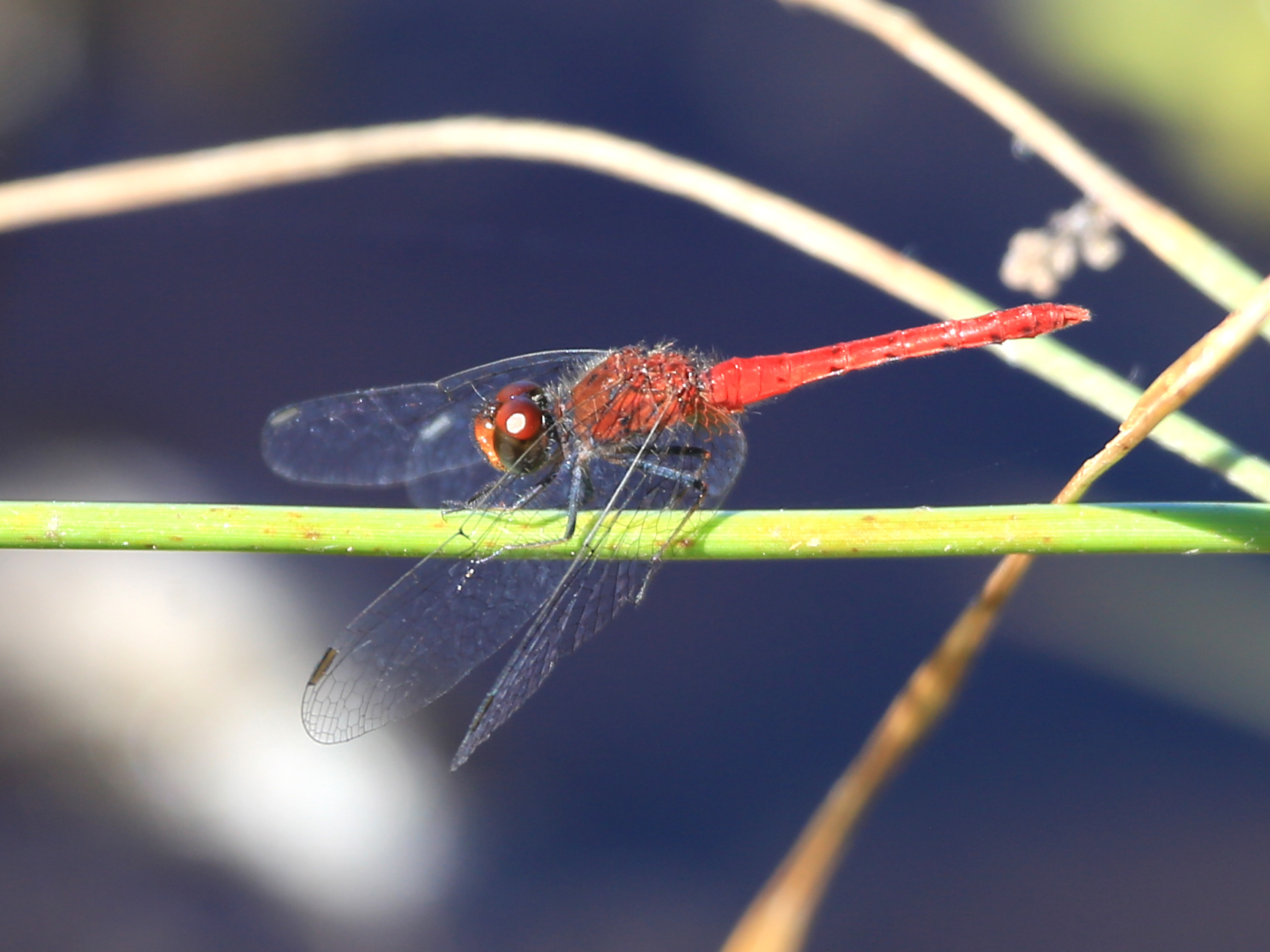
Side view of male

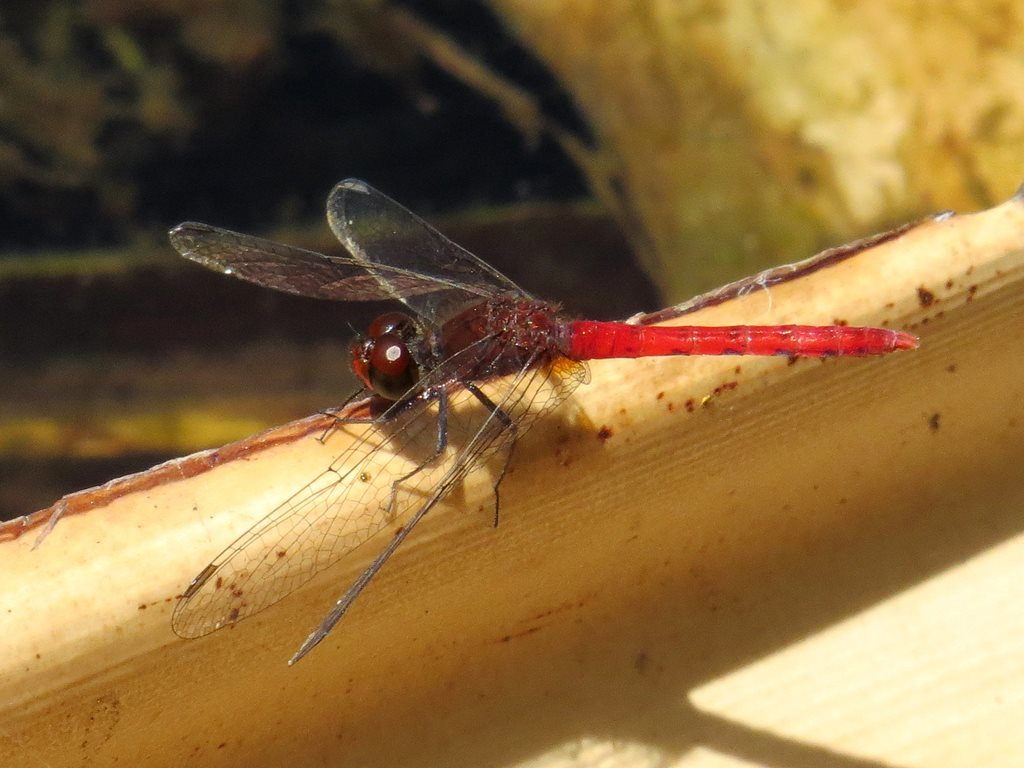
Dark markings on the sides and upper part of his tail

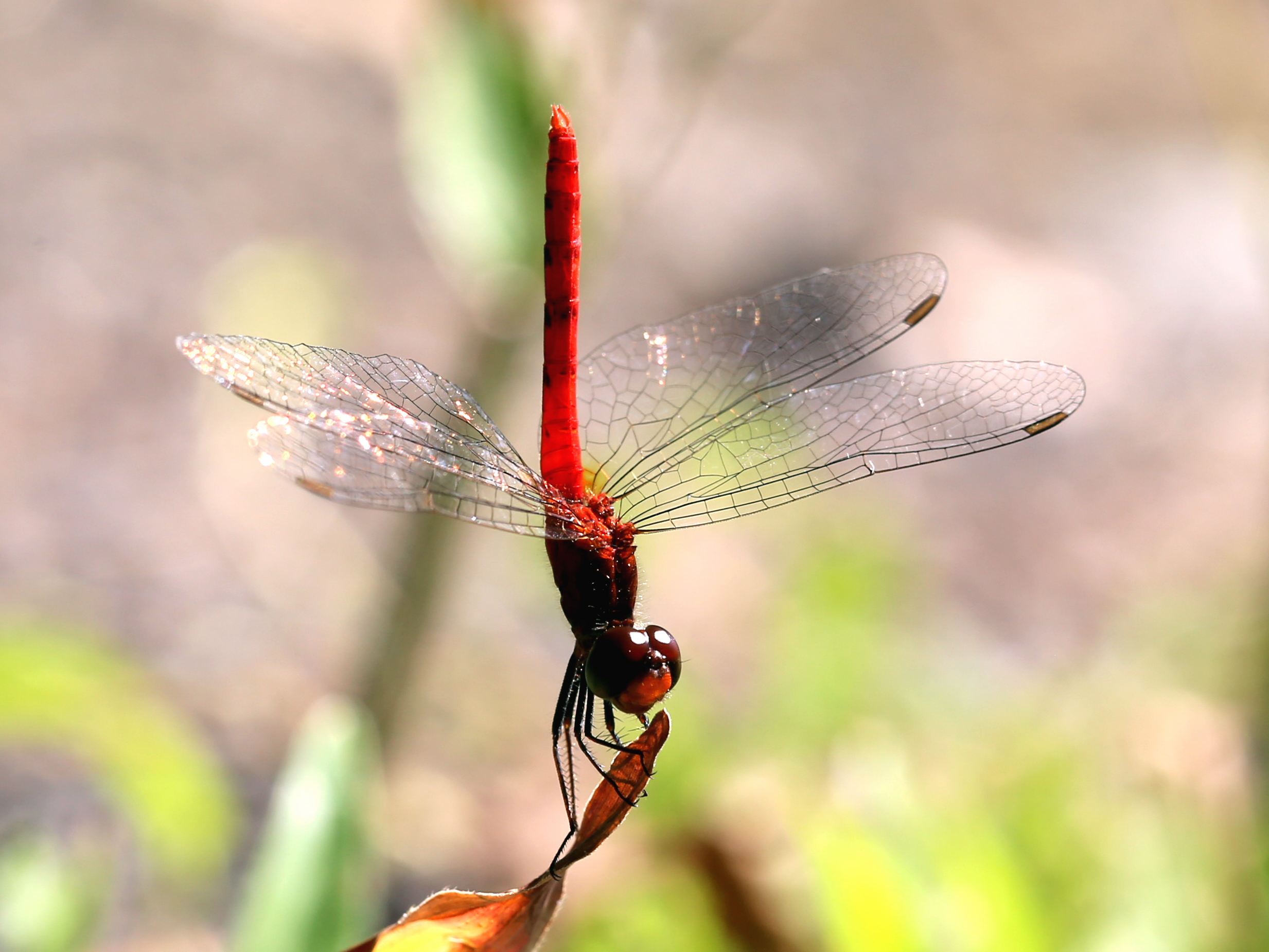
Obelisk position

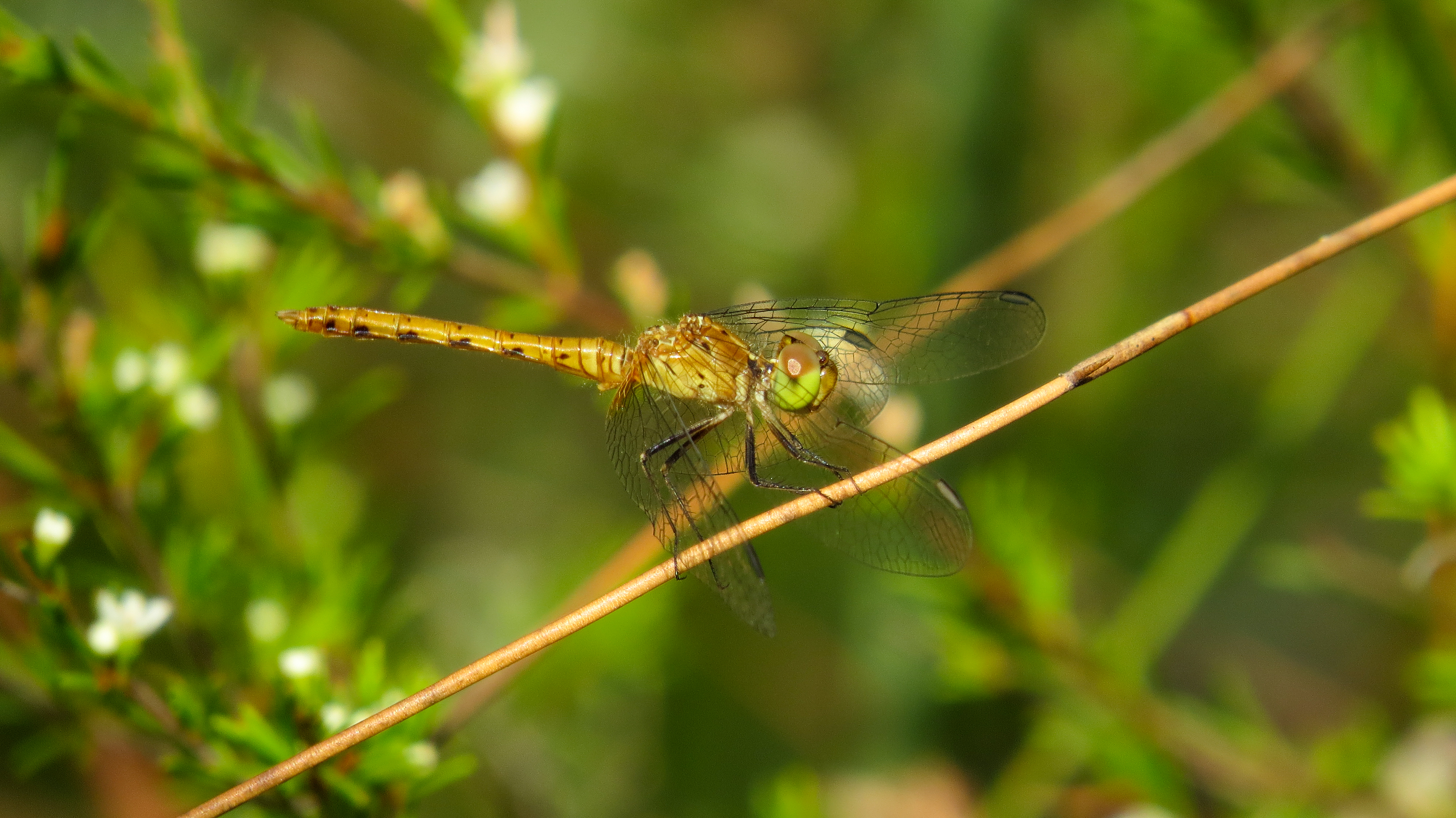
Young male before getting his adult colour

Drawing of Nannodiplax wings

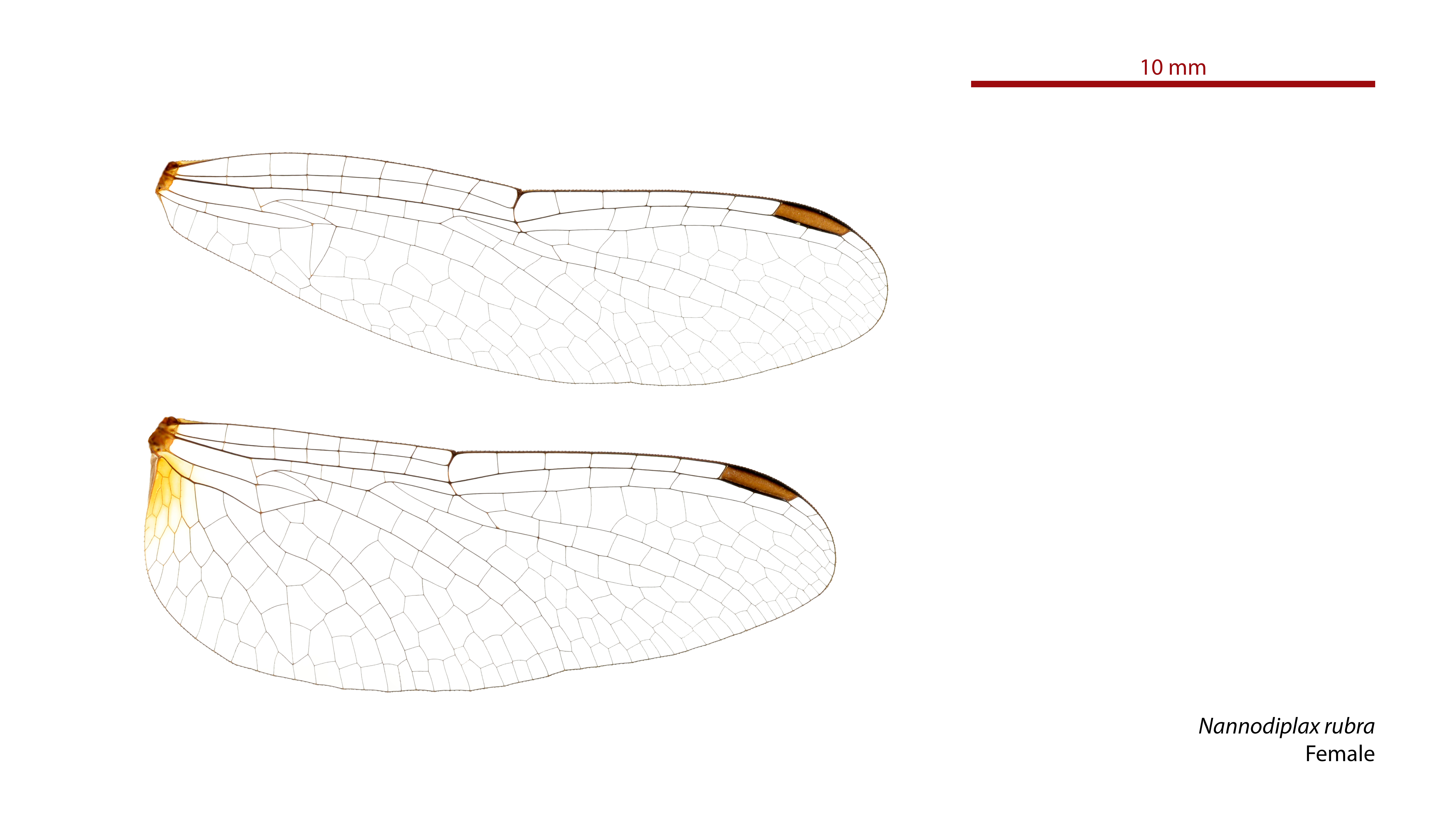
Photo of female wings

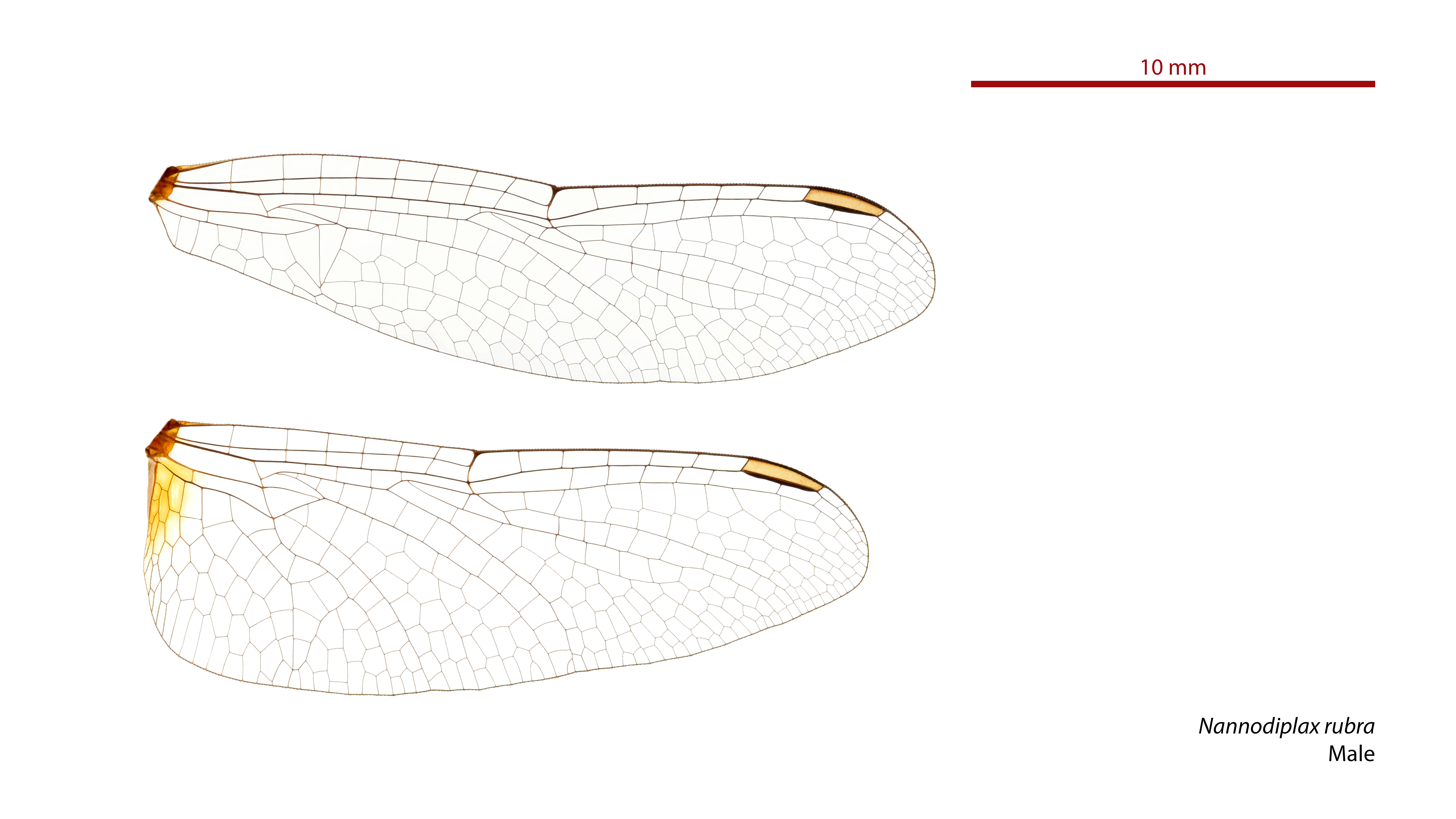
Photo of male wings

== See also ==
- List of Odonata species of Australia
