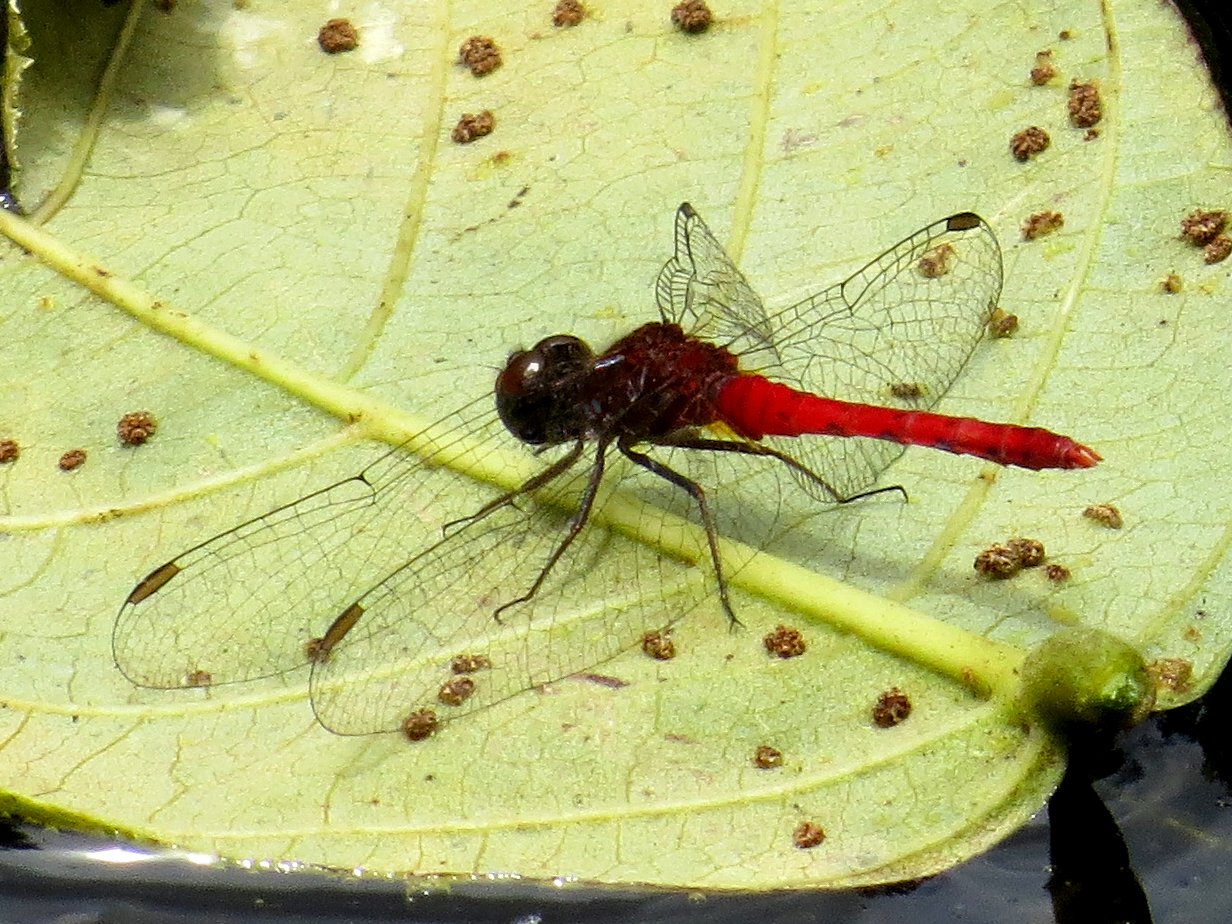
- Male Nannodiplax rubra
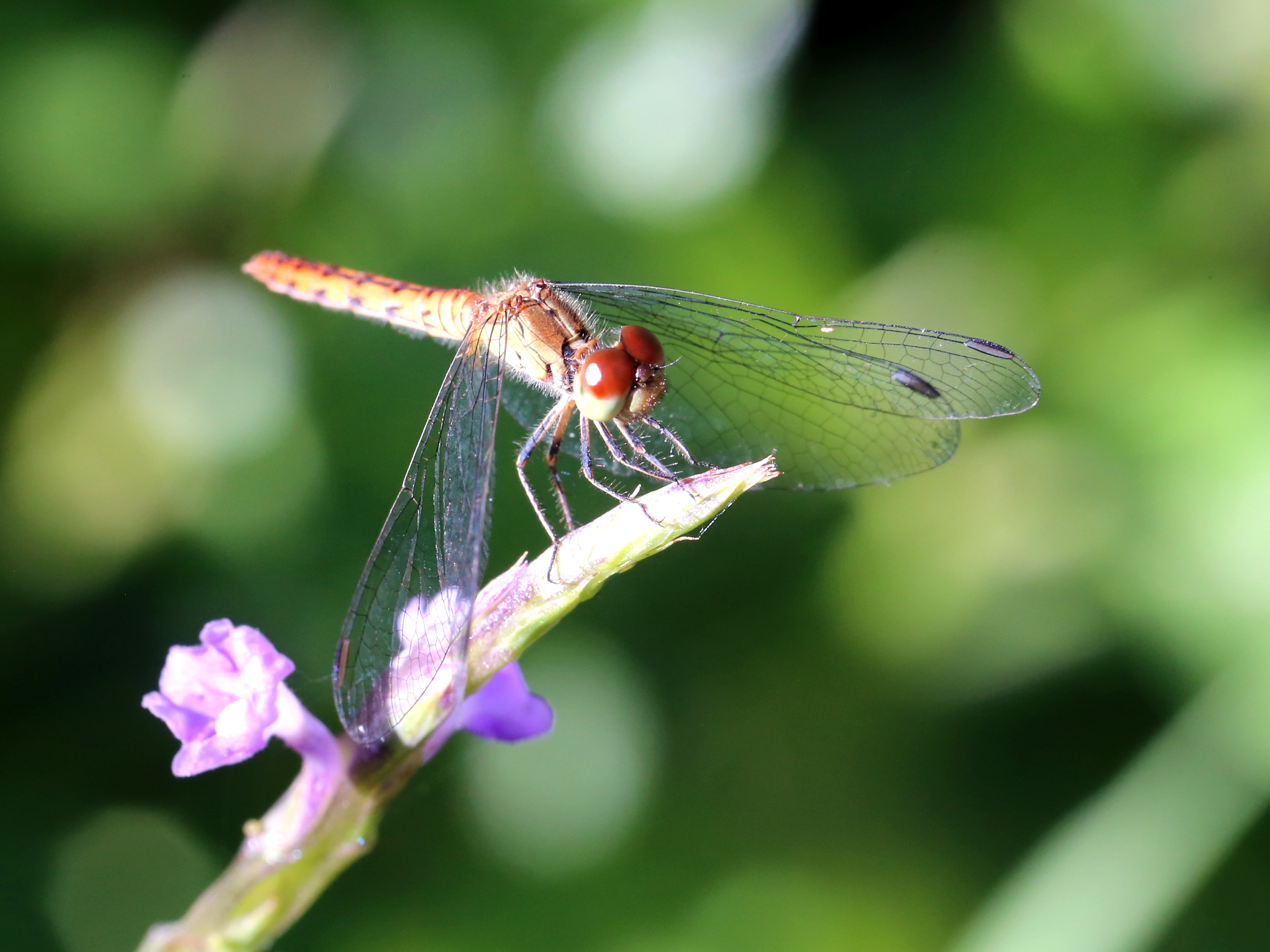
- Female Nannodiplax rubra

Scientific classification
- Kingdom: Animalia
- Phylum: Arthropoda
- Clade: Pancrustacea
- Class: Insecta
- Order: Odonata
- Infraorder: Anisoptera
- Family: Libellulidae
- Subfamily: Sympetrinae
- Genus: Nannodiplax; Brauer, 1868

= Nannodiplax =

Genus of dragonflies

Nannodiplax is a genus of dragonflies in the family Libellulidae. There is only one known species of this genus which occurs in New Guinea and Australia.

== Species ==
The genus Nannodiplax includes a single species:

- Nannodiplax rubra Brauer, 1868

== Etymology ==
The genus name Nannodiplax combines the Greek νάννος (nannos, "dwarf") with Diplax, a genus name derived from the Greek δίς (dis, "twice") and πλάξ (plax, "flat and broad"). The name probably refers to the small size of members of the genus.
