= Armagomphus =

Scientific classification
- Kingdom: Animalia
- Phylum: Arthropoda
- Clade: Pancrustacea
- Class: Insecta
- Order: Odonata
- Suborder: Anisoptera
- Family: Gomphidae
- Genus: Armagomphus; Carle, 1986

Genus of dragonflies

Armagomphus is a monotypic genus of dragonflies in the family Gomphidae, endemic to south-western Australia. The single known species is small in size with black and yellow markings.

== Species ==
The genus contains only one species:

- Armagomphus armiger (Tillyard, 1913) - Armourtail

== Etymology ==
The genus name Armagomphus is derived from the Latin arma ("arms", "armour" or "weapons of war"), combined with Gomphus, a genus name derived from the Greek γόμφος (gomphos, "peg" or "nail"), referring to the shape of the male abdomen. The name refers to the claw-like structure at the tip of the larva.

== See also ==
- List of Odonata species of Australia
