= Armagomphus armiger =

Armourtail

Conservation status
- Vulnerable (IUCN 3.1)

Scientific classification
- Kingdom: Animalia
- Phylum: Arthropoda
- Clade: Pancrustacea
- Class: Insecta
- Order: Odonata
- Suborder: Anisoptera
- Family: Gomphidae
- Genus: Armagomphus; Carle, 1986
- Species: A. armiger

Binomial name
- Armagomphus armiger (Tillyard, 1913)

Synonyms
- Austrogomphus armiger Tillyard, 1913

Species of dragonfly

Armagomphus armiger is a species of dragonfly of the family Gomphidae, known as an armourtail. It is the only known species of the monotypic genus Armagomphus.

Armagomphus armiger is endemic to south-western Australia, where it inhabits streams and rivers. It is a small dragonfly with black and yellow markings.

== Etymology ==
The genus name Armagomphus is derived from the Latin arma ("arms", "armour" or "weapons of war"), combined with Gomphus, a genus name derived from the Greek γόμφος (gomphos, "peg" or "nail"), referring to the shape of the male abdomen. The name refers to the claw-like structure at the tip of the larva.

The species name armiger is Latin for "bearing arms" or "armed", referring to the spurs at the tip of the male abdomen.

== Gallery ==
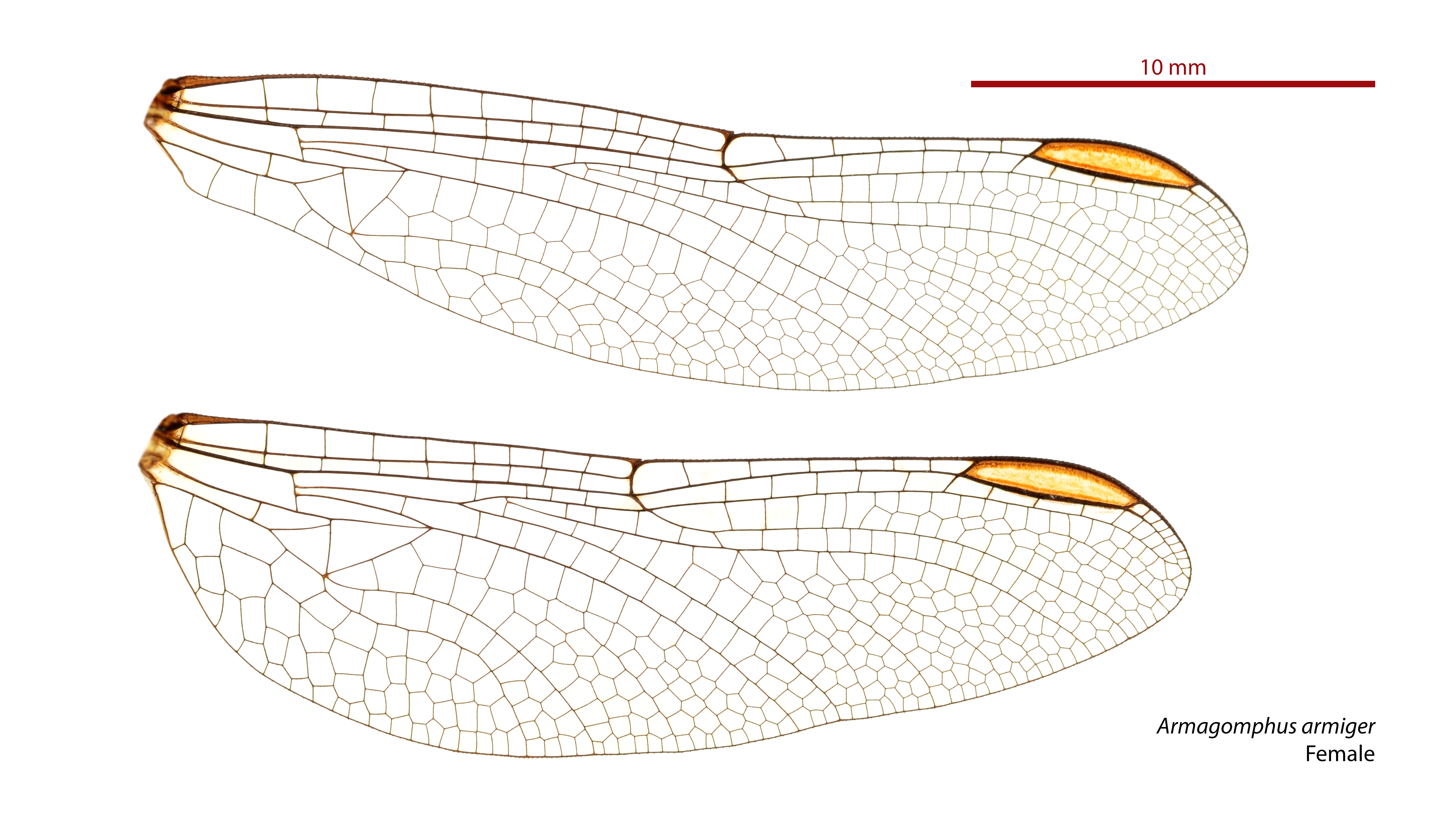
Female wings

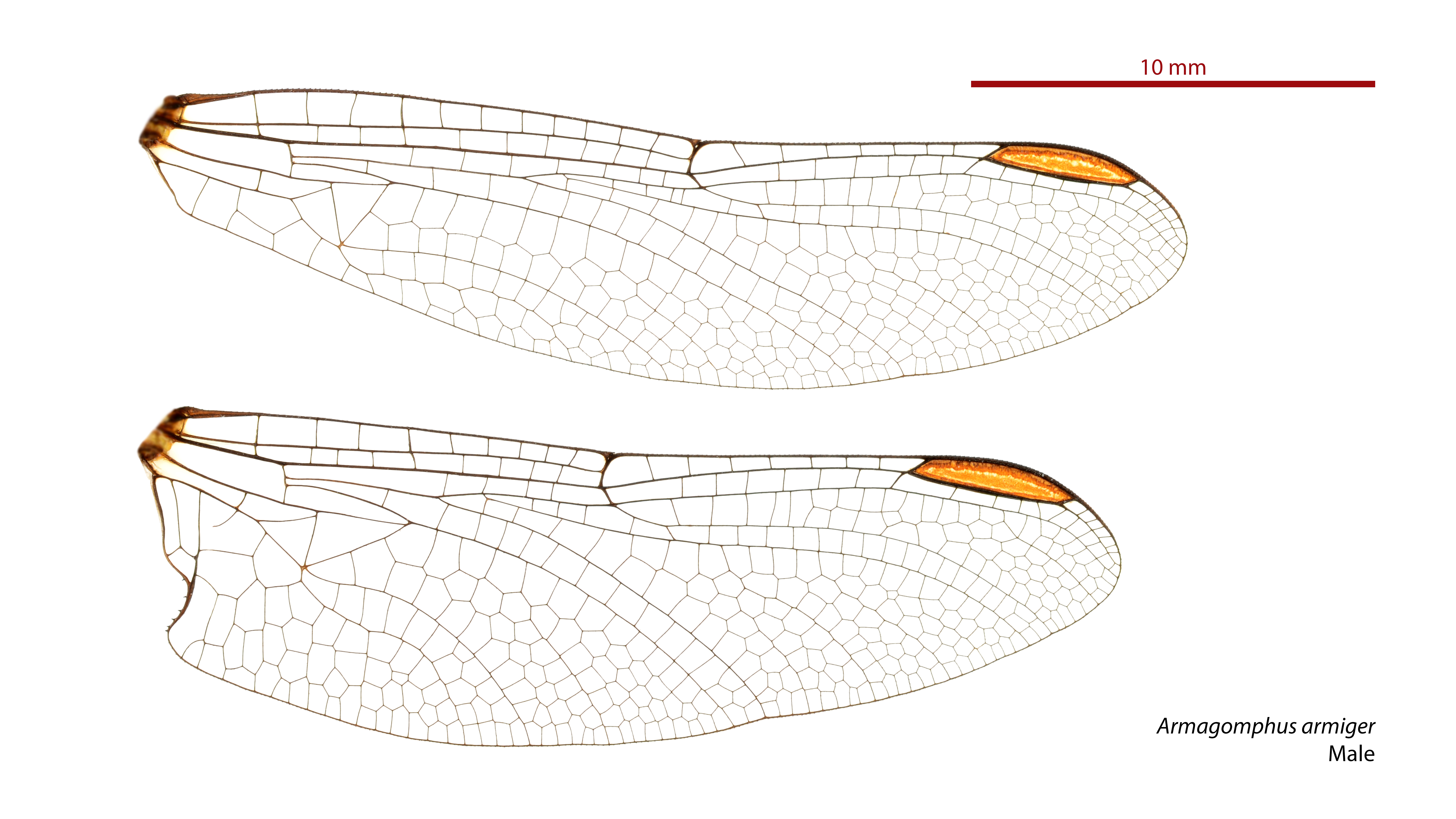
Male wings

== See also ==
- List of Odonata species of Australia
