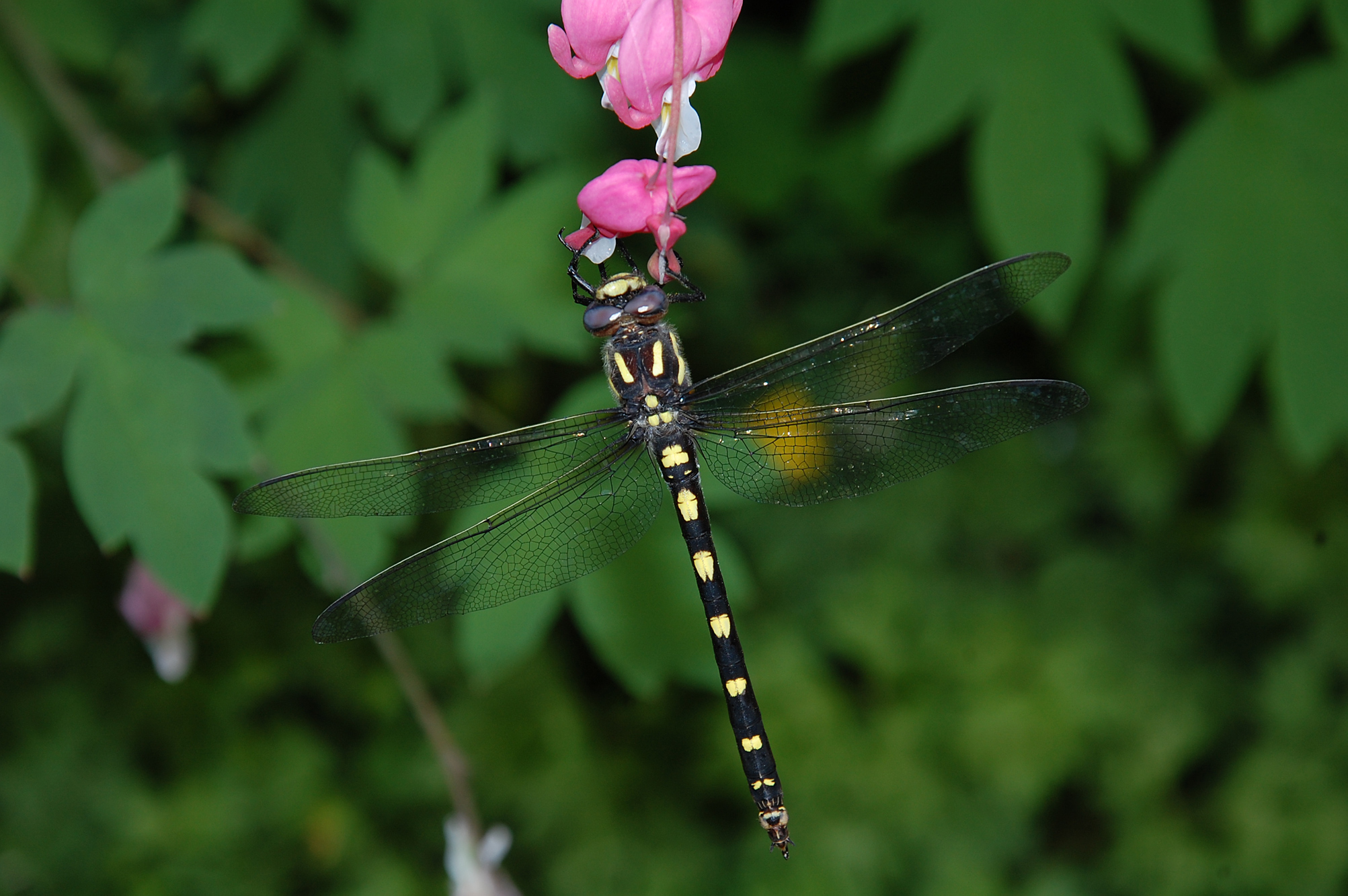

Conservation status
- Least Concern (IUCN 3.1)

Scientific classification
- Kingdom: Animalia
- Phylum: Arthropoda
- Clade: Pancrustacea
- Class: Insecta
- Order: Odonata
- Infraorder: Anisoptera
- Superfamily: Cordulegastroidea
- Family: Cordulegastridae
- Genus: Zoraena
- Species: Z. dorsalis

Binomial name
- Zoraena dorsalis (Hagen in Selys, 1858)

Synonyms
- Cordulegaster dorsalis Hagen, 1858

= Zoraena dorsalis =

Species of dragonfly

Zoraena dorsalis (Pacific spiketail) is a dragonfly in the family Cordulegastridae.
