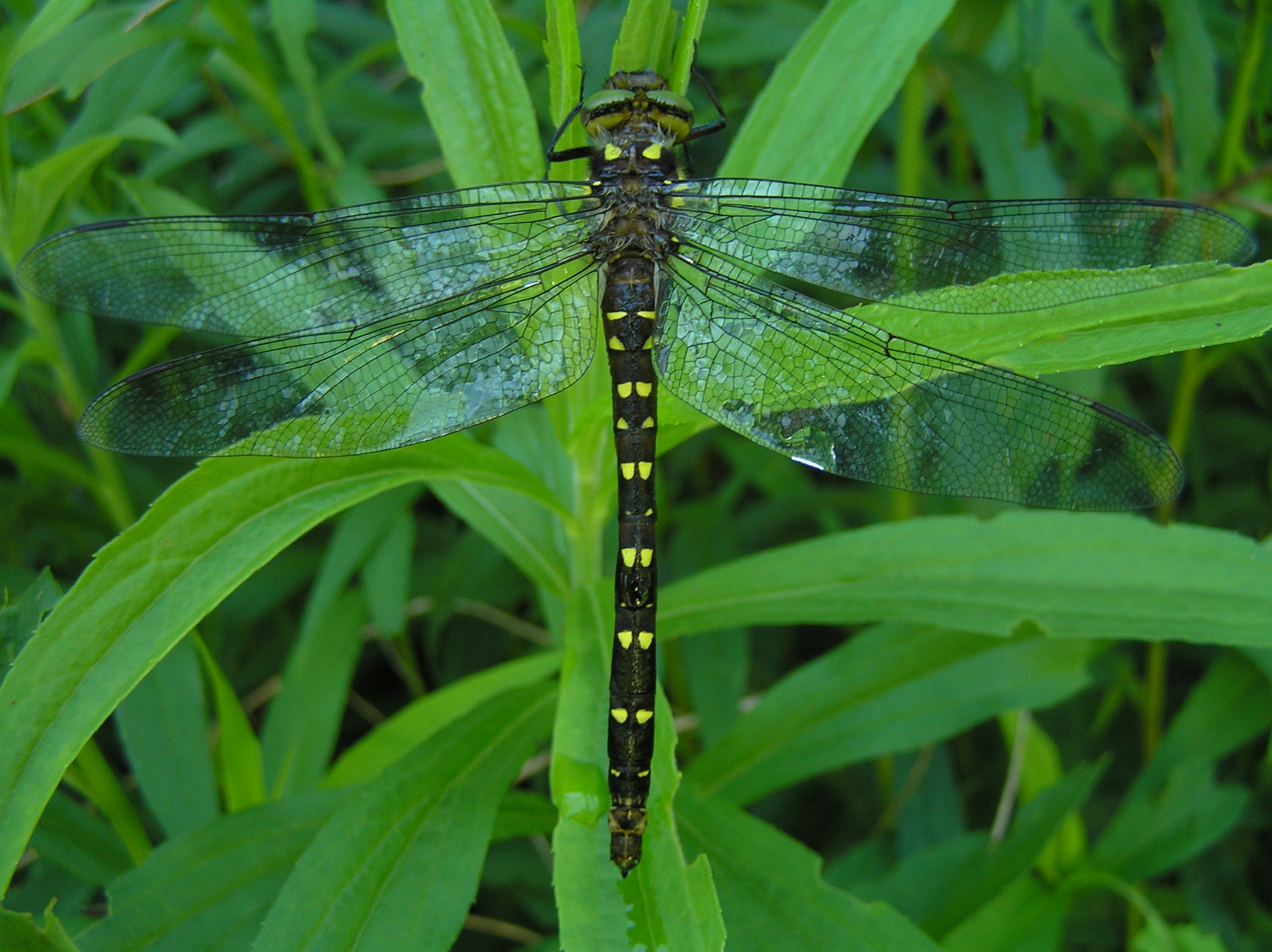

Conservation status
- Least Concern (IUCN 3.1)

Scientific classification
- Kingdom: Animalia
- Phylum: Arthropoda
- Clade: Pancrustacea
- Class: Insecta
- Order: Odonata
- Infraorder: Anisoptera
- Superfamily: Cordulegastroidea
- Family: Cordulegastridae
- Genus: Zoraena
- Species: Z. maculata

Binomial name
- Zoraena maculata (Selys, 1854)

Synonyms
- Cordulegaster maculata Selys, 1854

= Zoraena maculata =

Species of dragonfly

Zoraena maculata, also known as the twin-spotted spiketail, is a dragonfly of the family Cordulegastridae. Its body length varies in size from 2.5 to 3.0 inches.

This species was described by Edmond de Sélys Longchamps in 1854.
