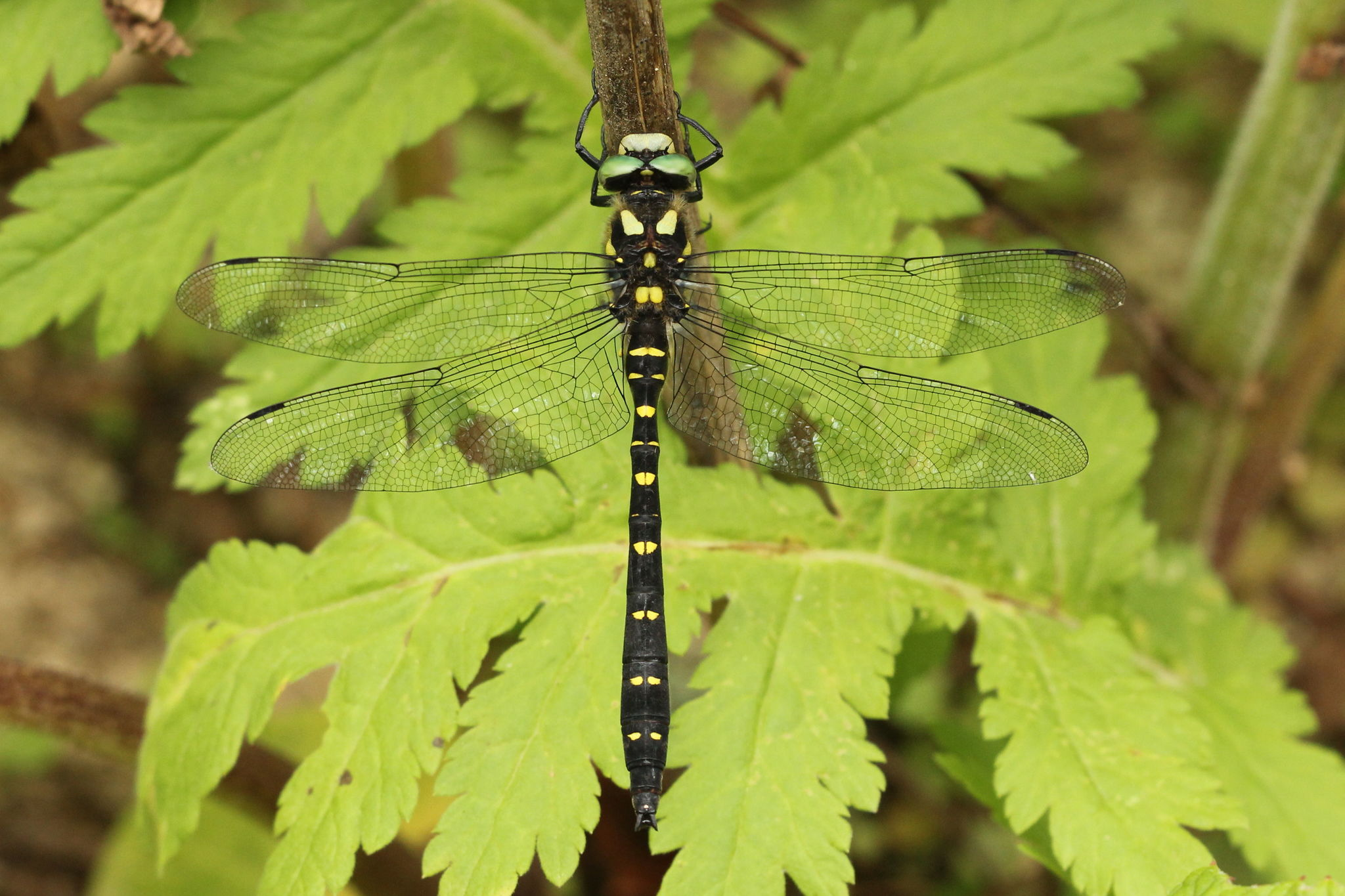

Conservation status
- Least Concern (IUCN 3.1)

Scientific classification
- Kingdom: Animalia
- Phylum: Arthropoda
- Clade: Pancrustacea
- Class: Insecta
- Order: Odonata
- Infraorder: Anisoptera
- Superfamily: Cordulegastroidea
- Family: Cordulegastridae
- Genus: Thecagaster
- Species: T. mzymtae

Binomial name
- Thecagaster mzymtae (Bartenev, 1929)

Synonyms
- Cordulegaster mzymtae Bartenev, 1929

= Thecagaster mzymtae =

Species of dragonfly

Thecagaster mzymtae is a species of dragonfly in the family Cordulegastridae. It is found in Georgia and Turkey. Its natural habitat is rivers. It is threatened by habitat loss.
