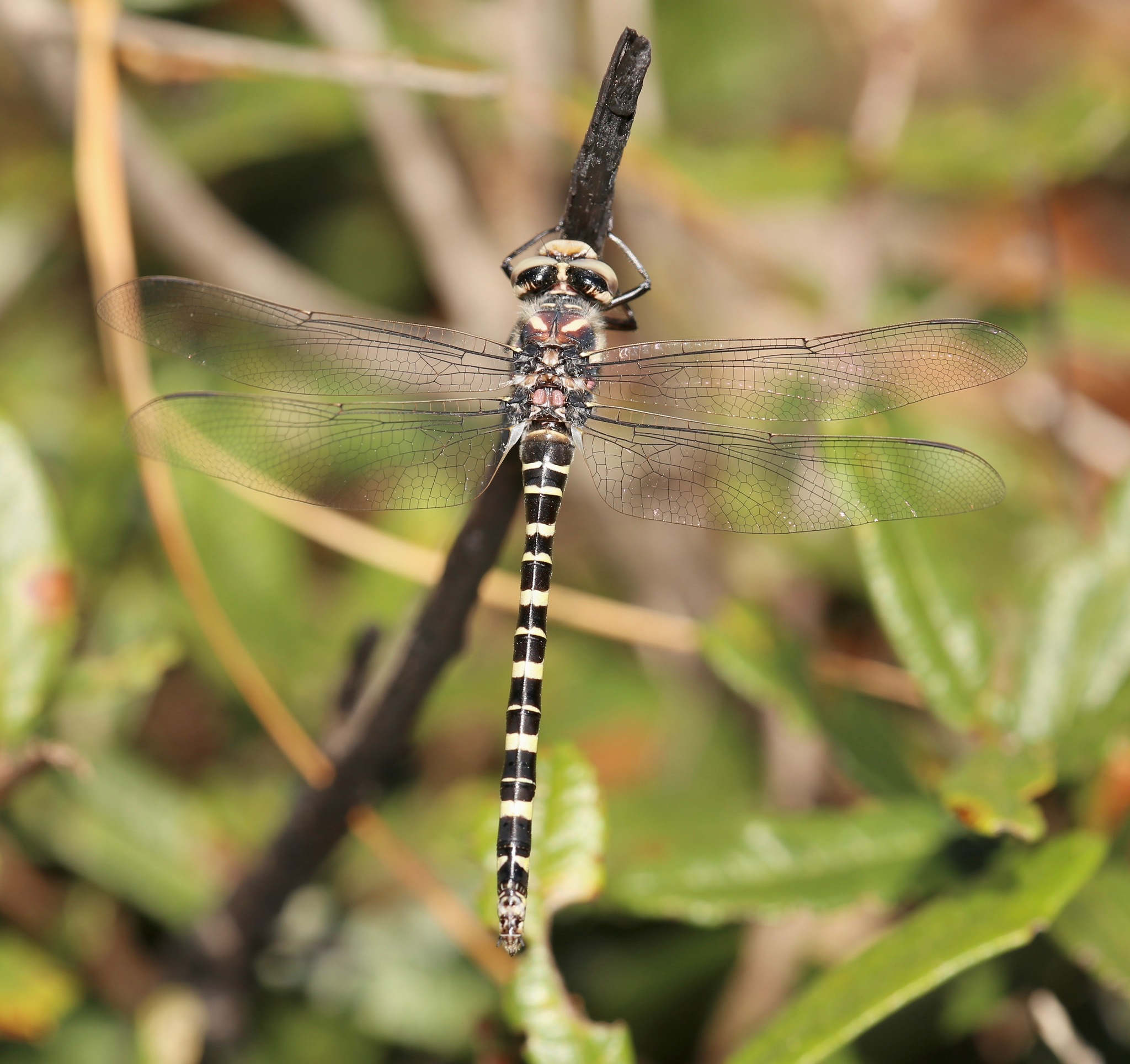

Conservation status
- Least Concern (IUCN 3.1)

Scientific classification
- Kingdom: Animalia
- Phylum: Arthropoda
- Clade: Pancrustacea
- Class: Insecta
- Order: Odonata
- Infraorder: Anisoptera
- Superfamily: Cordulegastroidea
- Family: Cordulegastridae
- Genus: Zoraena
- Species: Z. sayi

Binomial name
- Zoraena sayi (Selys, 1854)

Synonyms
- Cordulegaster sayi Selys, 1854

= Zoraena sayi =

Species of dragonfly

Zoraena sayi, commonly known as Say's spiketail, is a species of dragonfly in the family Cordulegastridae endemic to the United States.
