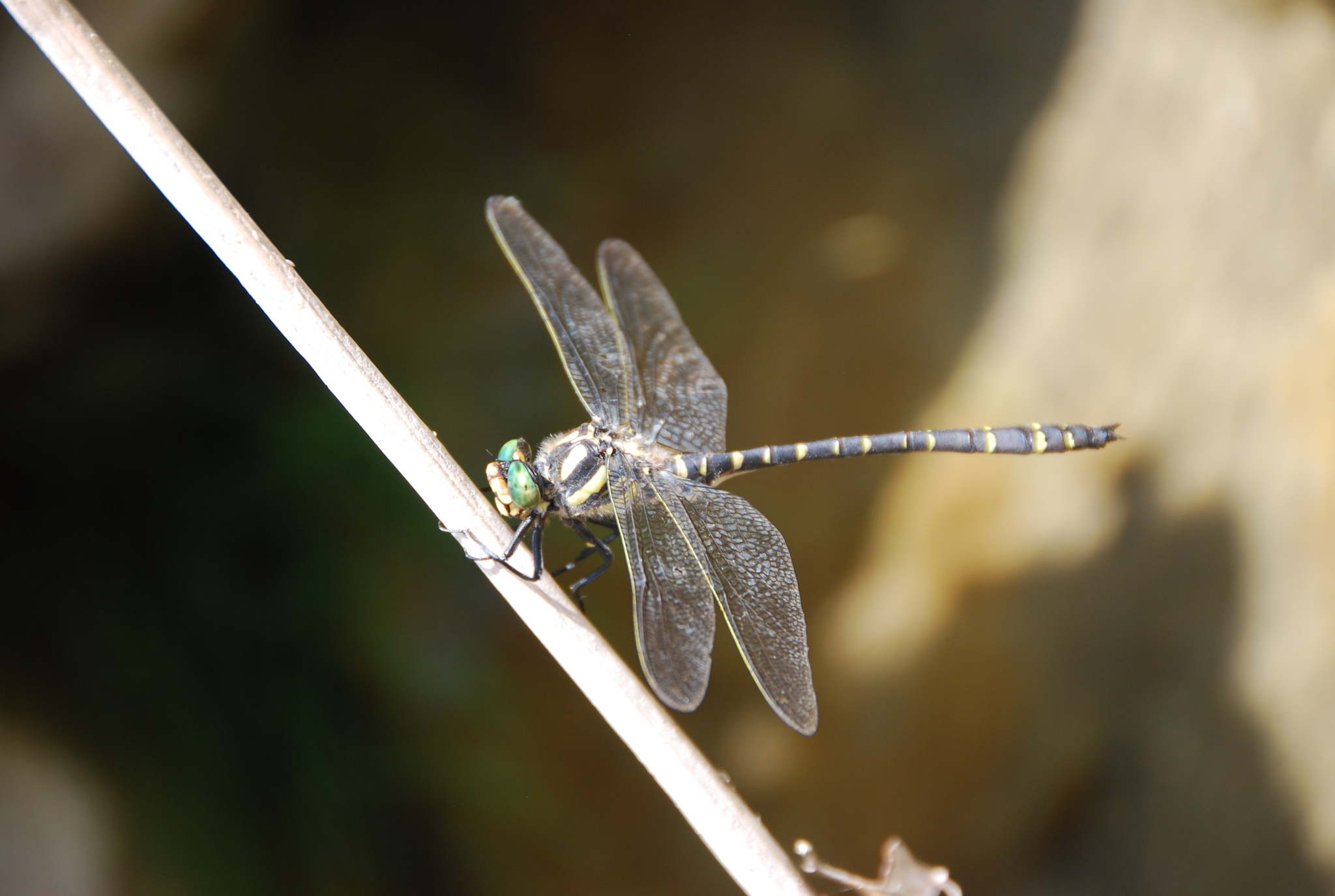

Conservation status
- Near Threatened (IUCN 3.1)

Scientific classification
- Kingdom: Animalia
- Phylum: Arthropoda
- Clade: Pancrustacea
- Class: Insecta
- Order: Odonata
- Infraorder: Anisoptera
- Superfamily: Cordulegastroidea
- Family: Cordulegastridae
- Genus: Cordulegaster
- Species: C. trinacriae

Binomial name
- Cordulegaster trinacriae Waterston, 1976

= Cordulegaster trinacriae =

Species of dragonfly

Cordulegaster trinacriae is a species of dragonfly in the family Cordulegastridae. It is endemic to central-southern Italy, from Abruzzo south to Calabria and Sicily, from where it was first described (hence the scientific name) (Corso 2019, Corso et al. 2020, Corso et al. 2025). Its natural habitats are humid forests, rivers and freshwater springs. It is threatened by habitat loss, water pollution, global warming and, as limiting direct impact, by the destructive tourism trend of "acqua-trekking".

== Sources ==
- Corso A., 2019. Morphological variability of Cordulegaster trinacriae in Italy (Odonata: Cordulegastridae). Odonatologica 48 (3/4): 175-201.
- Corso A., Penna V., Janni O., De Lisio L., Biscaccianti A., Holuša O. & Fabio Mastropasqua, 2020. New data on the distribution of the Italian endemic Cordulegaster trinacriae (Odonata: Cordulegastridae). Odonatologica 49 (3-4): 259-287. DOI: 10.5281/zenodo.4268551
- Corso A., Silvestrini W. & Amata C. 2025. Atlas of the Distribution and Taxonomy of the Odonata of Sicily. Natura Edizioni Scientifiche, Bologna, Pp 320.
