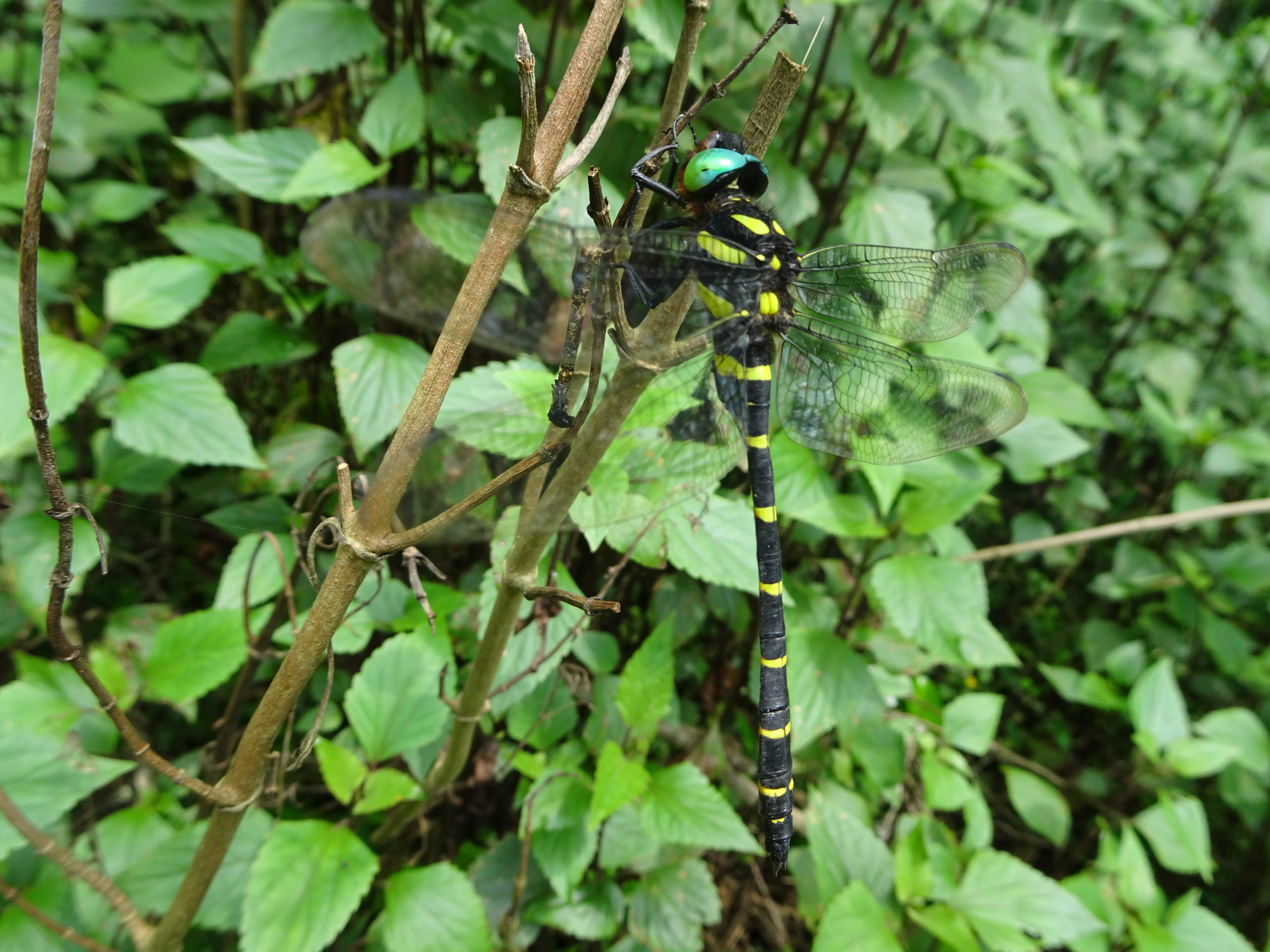

Scientific classification
- Kingdom: Animalia
- Phylum: Arthropoda
- Class: Insecta
- Order: Odonata
- Infraorder: Anisoptera
- Family: Cordulegastridae
- Genus: Anotogaster
- Species: A. nipalensis

Binomial name
- Anotogaster nipalensis (Selys, 1854)

= Anotogaster nipalensis =

Species of insect

Anotogaster nipalensis, commonly called the nepali golden-ringed dragonfly, is a species of dragonfly in the family Cordulegastridae. It is found in Nepal, Sikkim, and Arunachal Pradesh.
