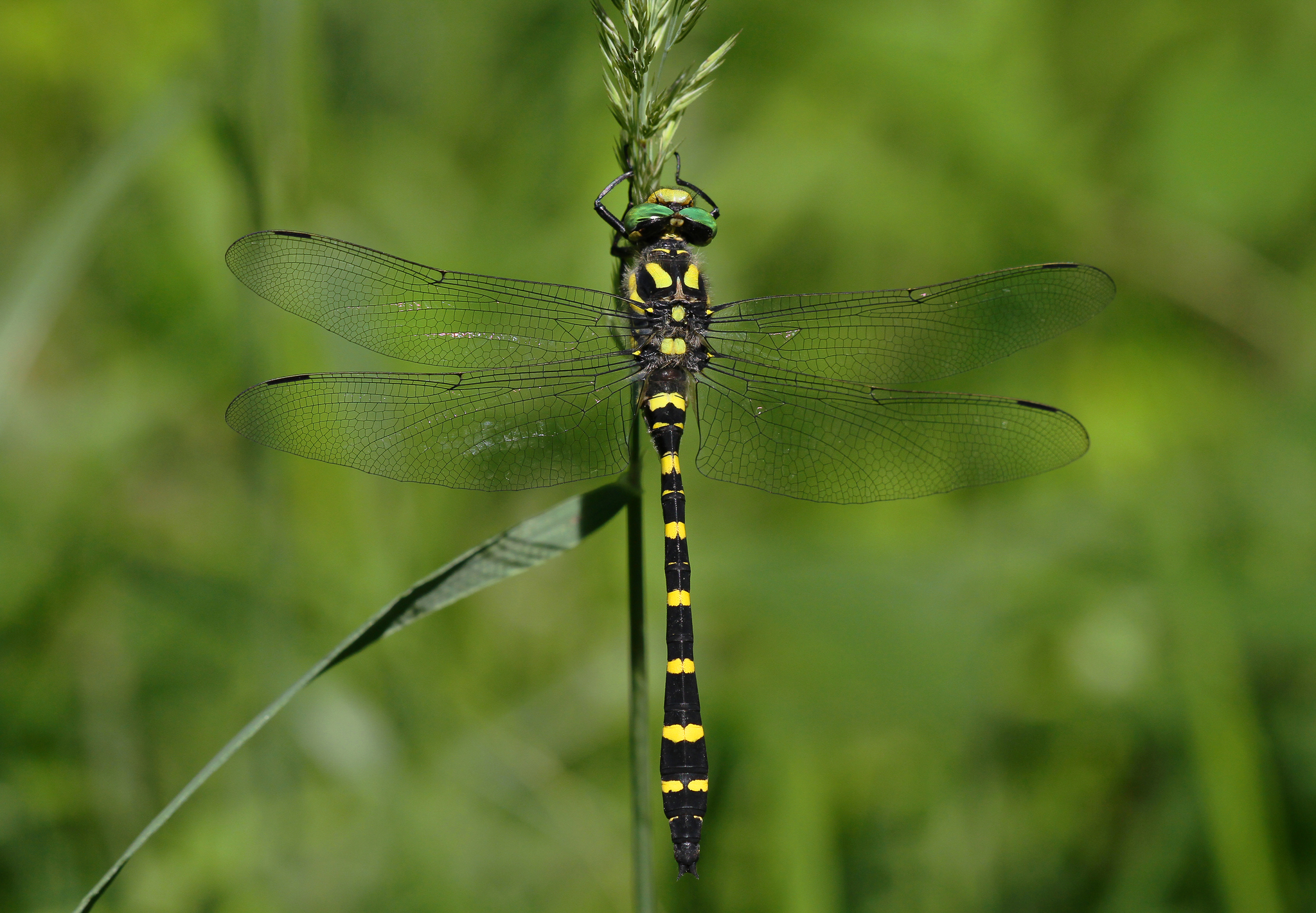

Conservation status
- Least Concern (IUCN 3.1)

Scientific classification
- Kingdom: Animalia
- Phylum: Arthropoda
- Class: Insecta
- Order: Odonata
- Infraorder: Anisoptera
- Family: Cordulegastridae
- Genus: Cordulegaster
- Species: C. heros

Binomial name
- Cordulegaster heros Theischinger, 1979

= Cordulegaster heros =

Species of dragonfly

Cordulegaster heros, commonly known as the Balkan goldenring, is a species of central-eastern European spiketail dragonfly. It is assessed as "Least Concern" on the IUCN's Red List.

== Distribution and habitat ==
The Balkan goldenring is endemic to Europe. It is commonly recorded in Slovenia, and is also found in eastern Italy, Austria, the Czech Republic, the Carpathian mountains of Slovakia and Ukraine, and throughout the Balkan region, extending from Croatia and Romania south to Greece through coastal and inland regions.

Balkan goldenrings live in wetlands.

== Conservation ==
Balkan goldenrings are threatened by habitat loss, which can be caused by human waterworks, logging, and agriculture, or by climate change-induced droughts. The species is particularly vulnerable to loss or alteration of streams.
