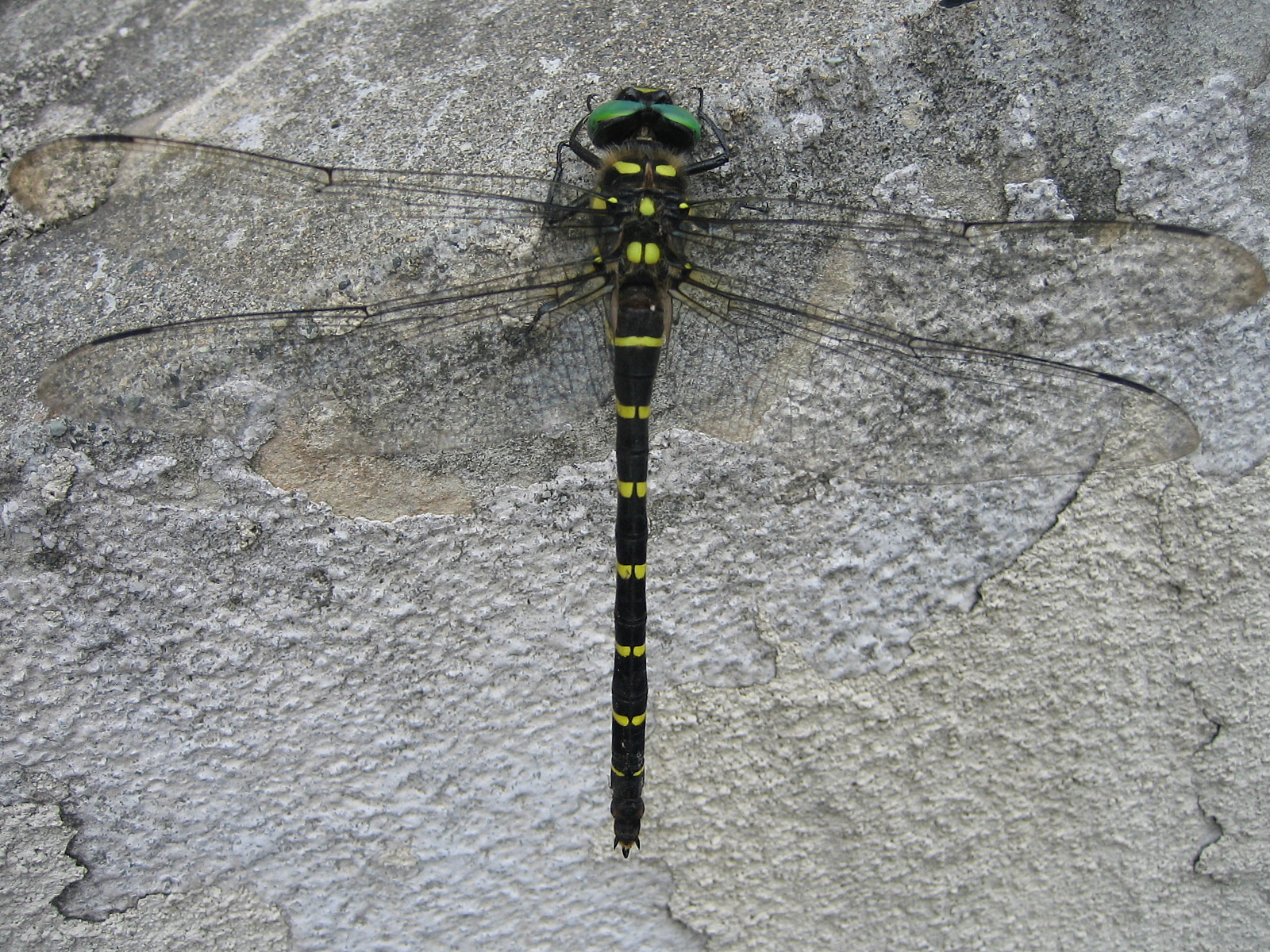
- Anotogaster sieboldii

Scientific classification
- Kingdom: Animalia
- Phylum: Arthropoda
- Clade: Pancrustacea
- Class: Insecta
- Order: Odonata
- Infraorder: Anisoptera
- Superfamily: Cordulegastroidea
- Family: Cordulegastridae
- Subfamily: Cordulegastrinae
- Genus: Anotogaster; Sélys, 1854

Synonyms
- Anatogaster

= Anotogaster =

Genus of dragonflies

Anotogaster is a genus in the dragonfly family Cordulegastridae. There are about 12 described species in Anotogaster, found mainly in Asia.

== Species ==
These species belong to the genus Anotogaster:

- Anotogaster amamensis Karube, Futahashi & Kawashima, 2025
- Anotogaster basalis Selys, 1854
- Anotogaster chaoi Zhou, 1998
- Anotogaster gigantica Fraser, 1924
- Anotogaster gregoryi Fraser, 1924
- Anotogaster klossi Fraser, 1919
- Anotogaster kuchenbeiseri (Förster, 1899)
- Anotogaster myosa Needham, 1930
- Anotogaster nipalensis (Selys, 1854)
- Anotogaster sakaii Zhou, 1988
- Anotogaster sapaensis Karube, 2012
- Anotogaster sieboldii (Selys, 1854)
