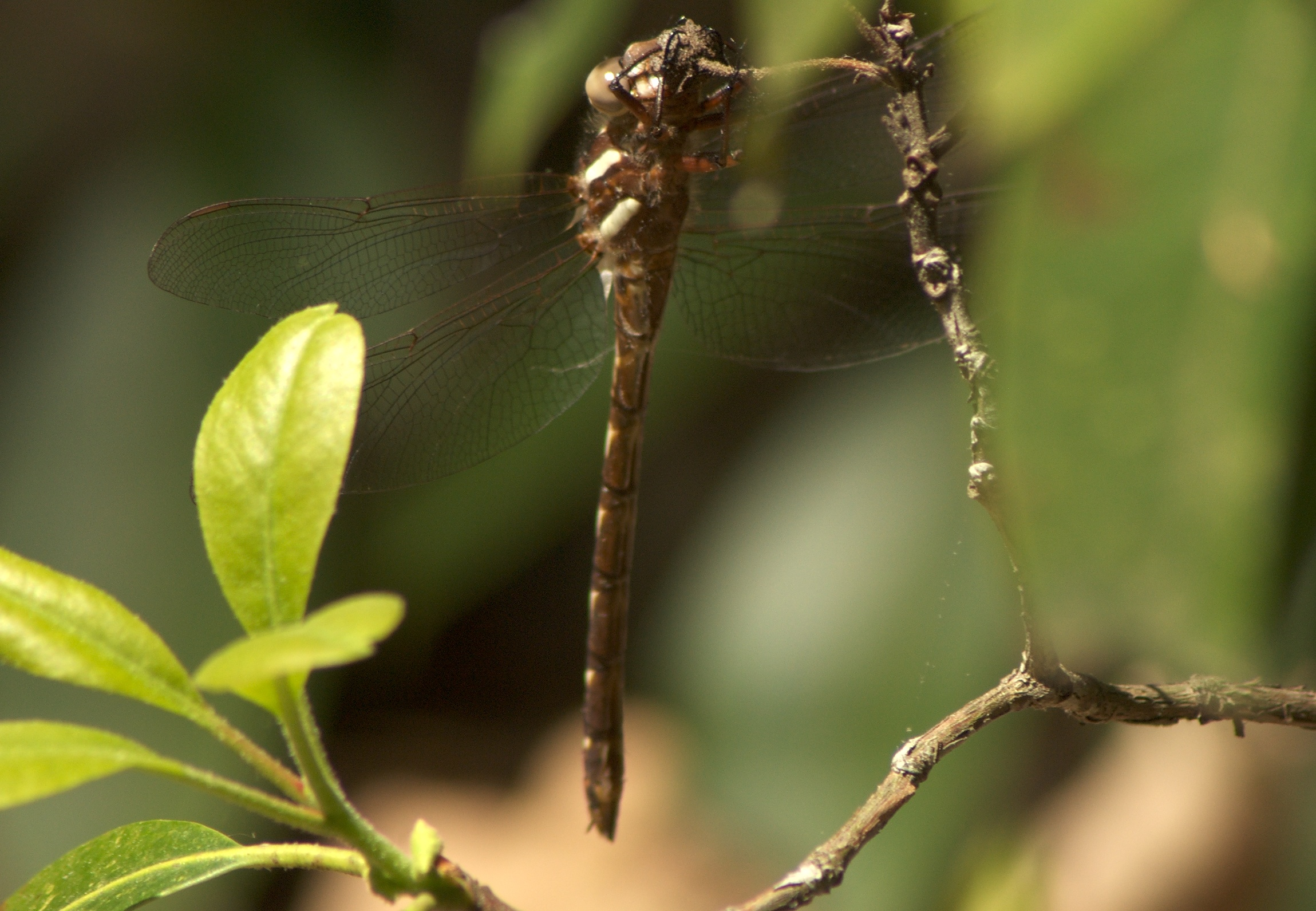

Conservation status
- Least Concern (IUCN 3.1)

Scientific classification
- Kingdom: Animalia
- Phylum: Arthropoda
- Clade: Pancrustacea
- Class: Insecta
- Order: Odonata
- Infraorder: Anisoptera
- Superfamily: Cordulegastroidea
- Family: Cordulegastridae
- Genus: Zoraena
- Species: Z. bilineata

Binomial name
- Zoraena bilineata Carle, 1983

Synonyms
- Cordulegaster bilineata (Carle, 1983)

= Zoraena bilineata =

Species of dragonfly

Zoraena bilineata, the brown spiketail, is a species of spiketail in the dragonfly family Cordulegastridae. It is found in North America.

The IUCN conservation status of Zoraena bilineata is "LC", least concern, with no immediate threat to the species' survival. The population is stable. The IUCN status was reviewed in 2017.
