= Cordulegaster vanbrinkae =

Conservation status
- Data Deficient (IUCN 3.1)

Scientific classification
- Kingdom: Animalia
- Phylum: Arthropoda
- Class: Insecta
- Order: Odonata
- Infraorder: Anisoptera
- Family: Cordulegastridae
- Genus: Cordulegaster
- Species: C. vanbrinkae

Binomial name
- Cordulegaster vanbrinkae Lohmann, 1993

Species of dragonfly

Cordulegaster vanbrinkae is a species of dragonfly in the family Cordulegastridae. It is endemic to Iran and Armenia. Its natural habitat is rivers.
