= A. sieboldii =

A. sieboldii may refer to:

- Anotogaster sieboldii, the oniyanma, the largest dragonfly species native to Japan
- Amphiesma sieboldii, the Sikkim keelback, a grass snake species found in South Asia

== Synonyms ==
- Aralia sieboldii, a synonym for Fatsia japonica, the fatsi or Japanese aralia, a plant species native to southern Japan

== See also ==
- Sieboldii
