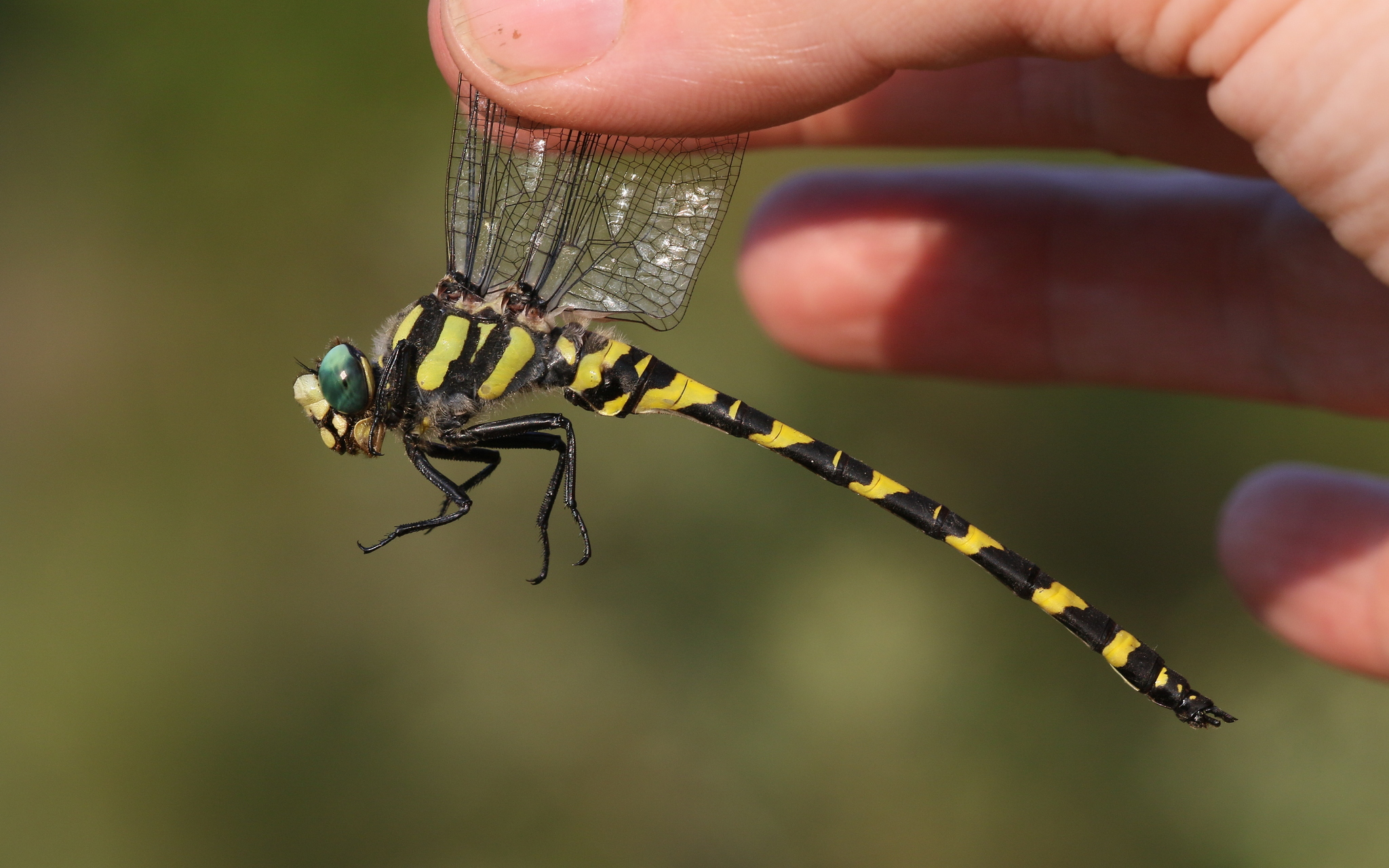

Conservation status
- Endangered (IUCN 3.1)

Scientific classification
- Kingdom: Animalia
- Phylum: Arthropoda
- Clade: Pancrustacea
- Class: Insecta
- Order: Odonata
- Infraorder: Anisoptera
- Superfamily: Cordulegastroidea
- Family: Cordulegastridae
- Genus: Thecagaster
- Species: T. helladica

Binomial name
- Thecagaster helladica (Lohmann, 1993)

Synonyms
- Cordulegaster helladica (Lohmann, 1993)

= Thecagaster helladica =

Species of dragonfly

Thecagaster helladica is a species of dragonfly in the family Cordulegastridae. It is endemic to Greece. Its natural habitats are subtropical or tropical dry forests, rivers, and freshwater springs. It is threatened by habitat loss.
