= Zoraena diastatops =

Conservation status
- Least Concern (IUCN 3.1)

Scientific classification
- Kingdom: Animalia
- Phylum: Arthropoda
- Clade: Pancrustacea
- Class: Insecta
- Order: Odonata
- Infraorder: Anisoptera
- Superfamily: Cordulegastroidea
- Family: Cordulegastridae
- Genus: Zoraena
- Species: Z. diastatops

Binomial name
- Zoraena diastatops (Selys, 1854)

Synonyms
- Cordulegaster diastatops (Selys, 1854); Zoraena lateralis (Scudder, 1866)

Species of dragonfly

Zoraena diastatops, the delta-spotted spiketail, is a species of spiketail in the family of dragonflies known as Cordulegastridae. It is found in North America.

The IUCN conservation status of this species is "LC", least concern, with no immediate threat to the species' survival. The population is stable.

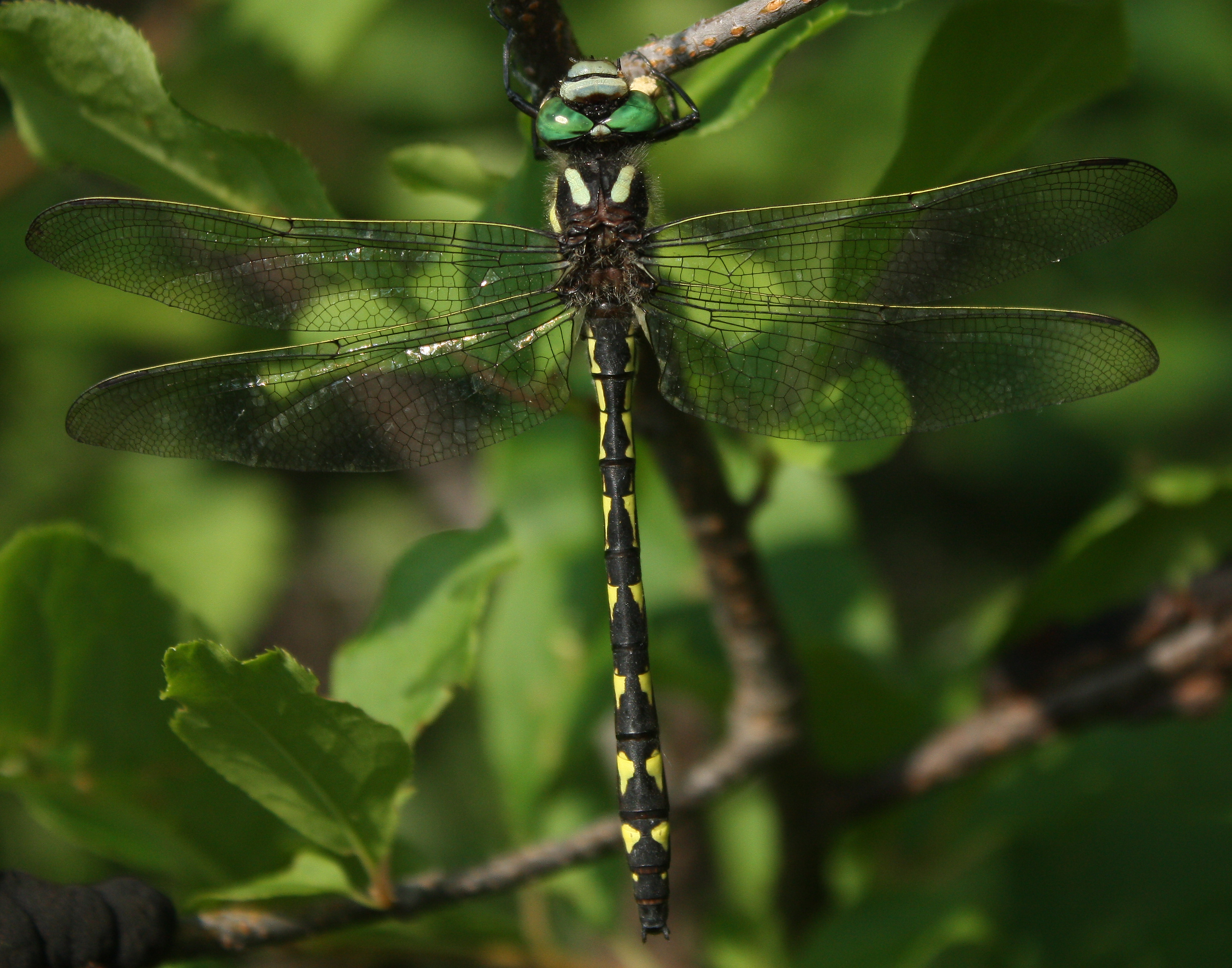
Delta-spotted spiketail, Zoraena diastatops

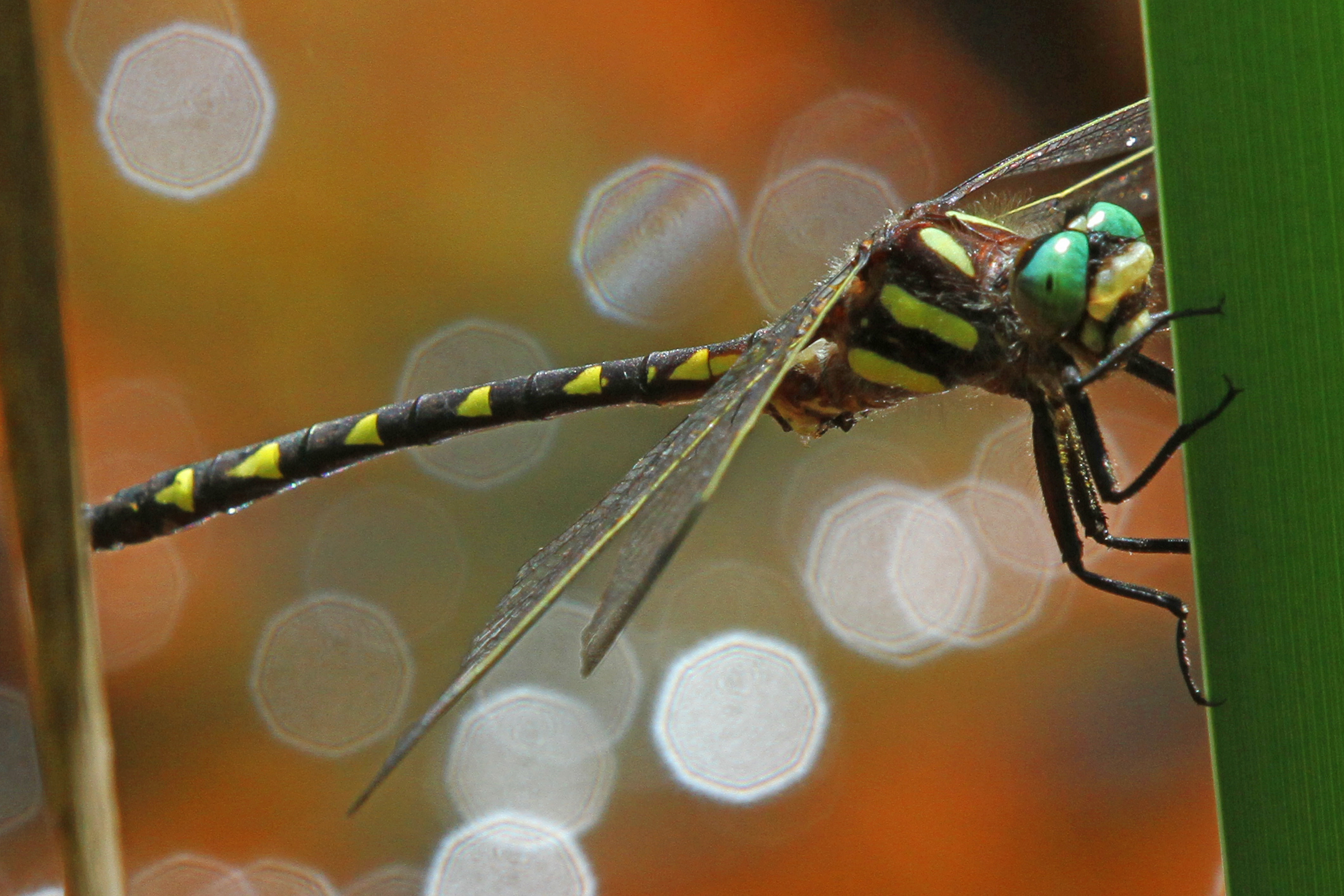
Delta-spotted spiketail, Zoraena diastatops
