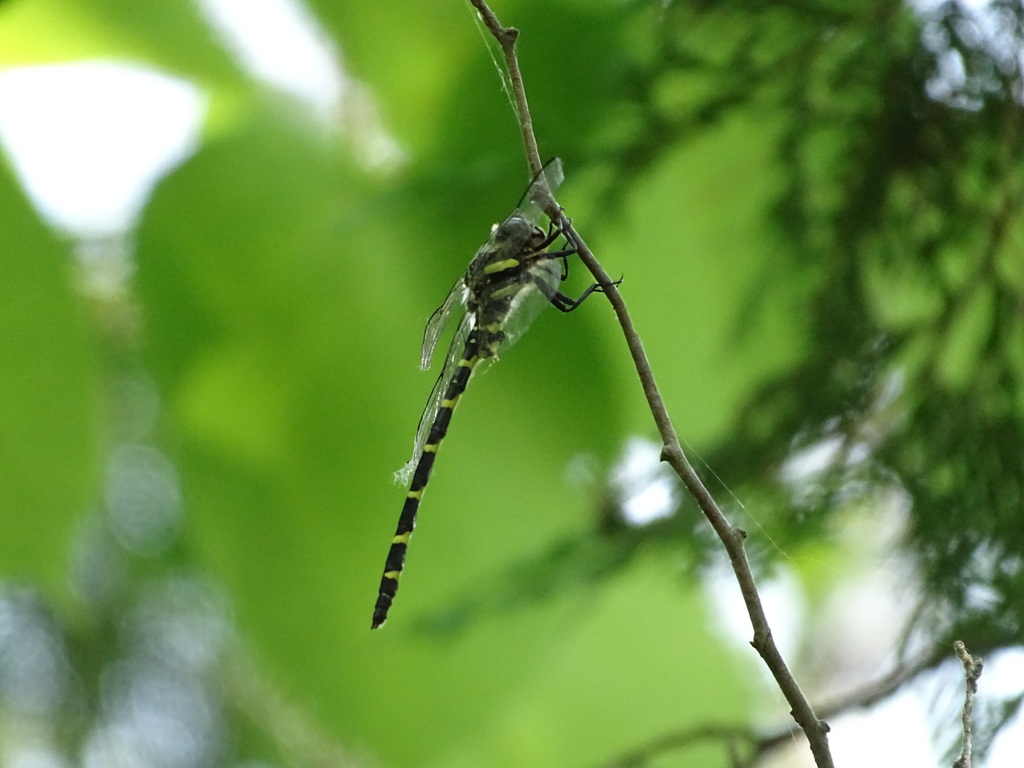

Conservation status
- Least Concern (IUCN 3.1)

Scientific classification
- Kingdom: Animalia
- Phylum: Arthropoda
- Clade: Pancrustacea
- Class: Insecta
- Order: Odonata
- Infraorder: Anisoptera
- Superfamily: Cordulegastroidea
- Family: Cordulegastridae
- Genus: Zoraena
- Species: Z. erronea

Binomial name
- Zoraena erronea (Selys, 1878)

Synonyms
- Cordulegaster erronea Selys, 1878

= Zoraena erronea =

Species of dragonfly

Zoraena erronea, the tiger spiketail, is a species of spiketail in the dragonfly family Cordulegastridae. It is found in North America.

The IUCN conservation status of this species is "LC", least concern, with no immediate threat to the species' survival. The population is stable.
