= Cordulegaster diadema =

Conservation status
- Least Concern (IUCN 3.1)

Scientific classification
- Kingdom: Animalia
- Phylum: Arthropoda
- Class: Insecta
- Order: Odonata
- Infraorder: Anisoptera
- Family: Cordulegastridae
- Genus: Cordulegaster
- Species: C. diadema

Binomial name
- Cordulegaster diadema Sélys, 1868

Species of dragonfly

Cordulegaster diadema, commonly known as the Apache spiketail, is a species of dragonfly in the family Cordulegastridae. The mature adult is usually 74-88 millimeters long. It ranges from southwestern United States to Mexico and Costa Rica. The back of the head is yellow to brown with yellow to black hairs, though some have been reported with a black head with white hairs. The first proximal segment of the legs are yellow. The thorax has two lateral stripes with a yellow stripe between them.
