= Cordulegaster princeps =

Conservation status
- Least Concern (IUCN 3.1)

Scientific classification
- Kingdom: Animalia
- Phylum: Arthropoda
- Class: Insecta
- Order: Odonata
- Infraorder: Anisoptera
- Family: Cordulegastridae
- Genus: Cordulegaster
- Species: C. princeps

Binomial name
- Cordulegaster princeps Morton, 1915

Species of dragonfly

Cordulegaster princeps is a species of dragonfly in the family Cordulegastridae. It is endemic to Morocco. Its natural habitat is rivers. It is threatened by habitat loss.
