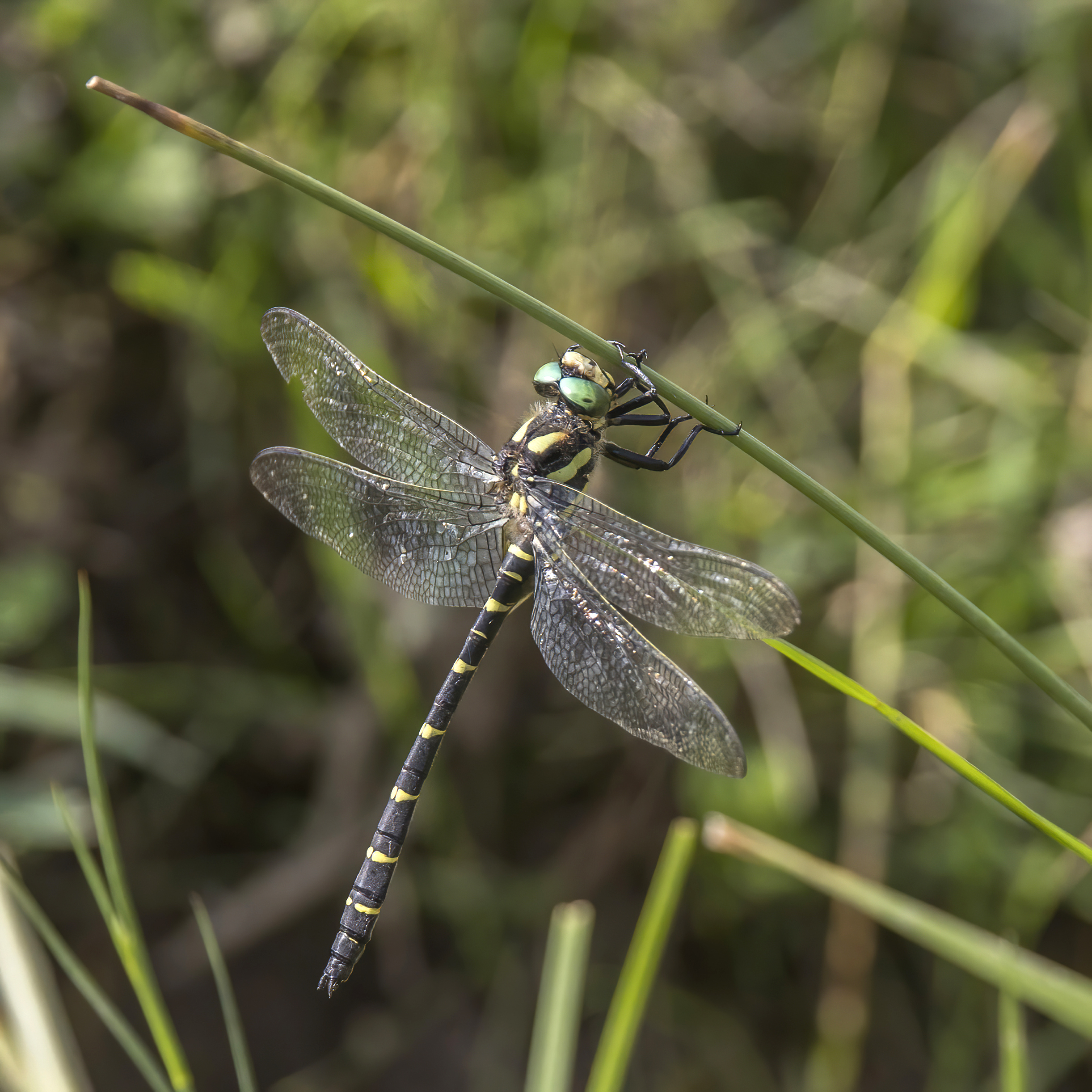
- Male, Romania

Conservation status
- Near Threatened (IUCN 3.1)

Scientific classification
- Kingdom: Animalia
- Phylum: Arthropoda
- Clade: Pancrustacea
- Class: Insecta
- Order: Odonata
- Infraorder: Anisoptera
- Superfamily: Cordulegastroidea
- Family: Cordulegastridae
- Genus: Thecagaster
- Species: T. bidentata

Binomial name
- Thecagaster bidentata (Selys, 1843)

Synonyms
- Cordulegaster bidentata Selys, 1843

= Thecagaster bidentata =

Species of dragonfly

Thecagaster bidentata, also known as sombre goldenring or two-toothed goldenring, is a species of dragonfly in the family Cordulegastridae.

This species was formerly a member of the genus Cordulegaster, and is sometimes referred to as Cordulegaster bidentata.

== Description ==
This species is identifiable by its black body and yellow rings. Adults are approximately 8 centimetres (3.1 in) in body length with a 10 centimetres (3.9 in) wingspan, and have a similar appearance to the related species Cordulegaster boltonii.

== Distribution and habitat ==
This species is primarily found in Central and Southern Europe, spreading as far south as Sicily, where the subspecies Thecagaster bidentata sicilica is found. It lives primarily around mountain springs. This species is scattered throughout Central and Western Europe. The population rate is declining, the biggest threat to this species being droughts which are a result of global warming.

== Behaviour and development ==
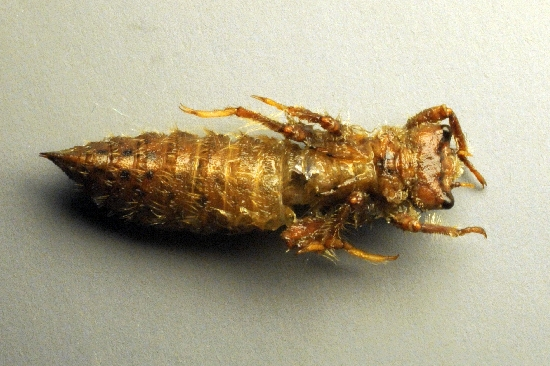
Larva

Thecagaster bidentata breeds in mountain springs, and the larvae are benthic, living in the lowest reaches of the water. As a result of this, larval sites are difficult to locate and study. Breeding takes place in May–June, with eggs being laid in the upper reaches of the streams. Larval development takes between three and five years, and can be slowed if cold weather causes the water to freeze. The larvae may sometimes leave the water, hunting for small arthropods on the ground at night.
