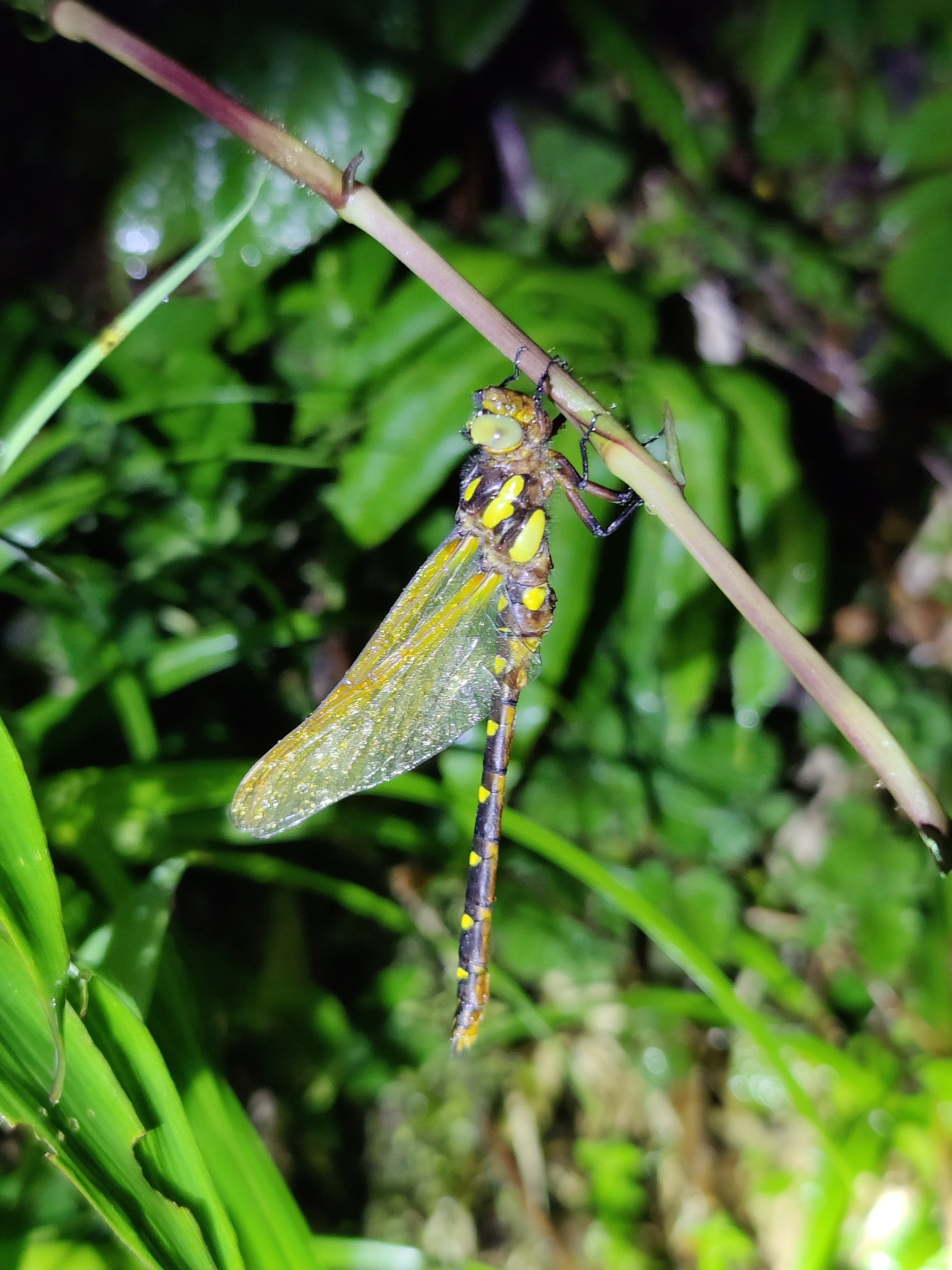
- Neallogaster hermionae, India

Scientific classification
- Kingdom: Animalia
- Phylum: Arthropoda
- Clade: Pancrustacea
- Class: Insecta
- Order: Odonata
- Infraorder: Anisoptera
- Family: Cordulegastridae
- Genus: Neallogaster; Cowley, 1934

Synonyms
- Allogaster Selys, 1878

= Neallogaster =

Genus of dragonflies

Neallogaster is a genus in the dragonfly family Cordulegastridae. There are about eight described species in Neallogaster, found in Asia.

== Species ==
These species belong to the genus Neallogaster:

- Neallogaster annandalei (Fraser, 1923)
- Neallogaster choui Yang & Li, 1994
- Neallogaster hermionae (Fraser, 1927)
- Neallogaster jinensis (Zhu & Han, 1992)
- Neallogaster latifrons Selys, 1878
- Neallogaster lunifera (Selys, 1878)
- Neallogaster ornata Asahina, 1982
- Neallogaster schmidti Asahina, 1982
