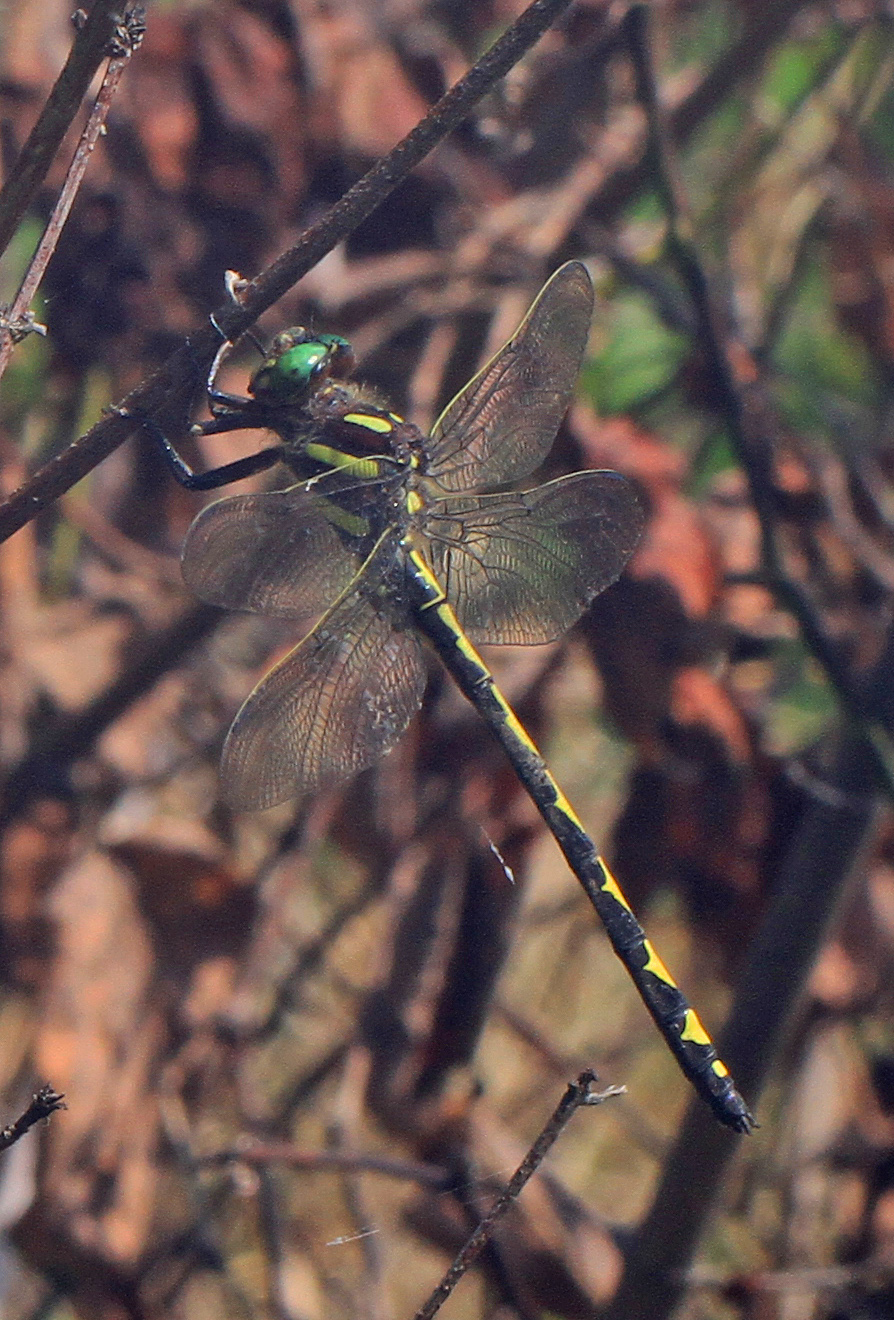

Conservation status
- Least Concern (IUCN 3.1)

Scientific classification
- Kingdom: Animalia
- Phylum: Arthropoda
- Clade: Pancrustacea
- Class: Insecta
- Order: Odonata
- Infraorder: Anisoptera
- Family: Cordulegastridae
- Genus: Zoraena
- Species: Z. obliqua

Binomial name
- Zoraena obliqua (Say, 1840)

Synonyms
- Cordulegaster obliqua (Say, 1840)

= Zoraena obliqua =

Species of dragonfly

Zoraena obliqua, the arrowhead spiketail, is a species of spiketail in the dragonfly family Cordulegastridae. It is found in North America, often in clearings near small rivers and streams. The larvae can be found surviving in streams designated as intermittent, and may live up to 5 years before emerging as an adult in early summer.

The IUCN conservation status of this species is "LC", least concern, with no immediate threat to the species' survival. The population is stable. The IUCN status was reviewed in 2017.

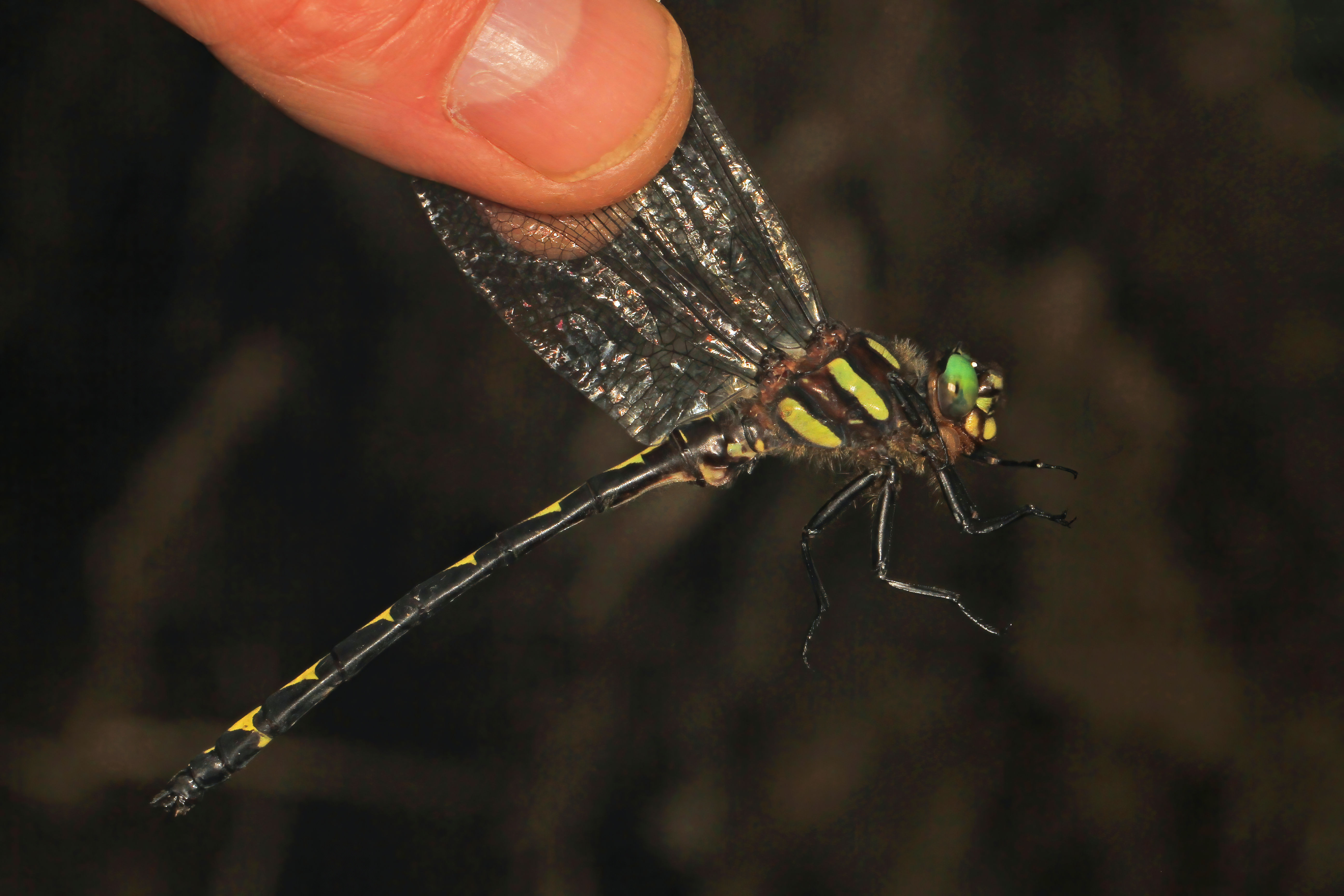
Arrowhead spiketail, Zoraena obliqua

== Subspecies ==
These two subspecies belong to this species:

- Zoraena obliqua fasciata Rambur, 1842
- Zoraena obliqua obliqua (Say, 1839)
