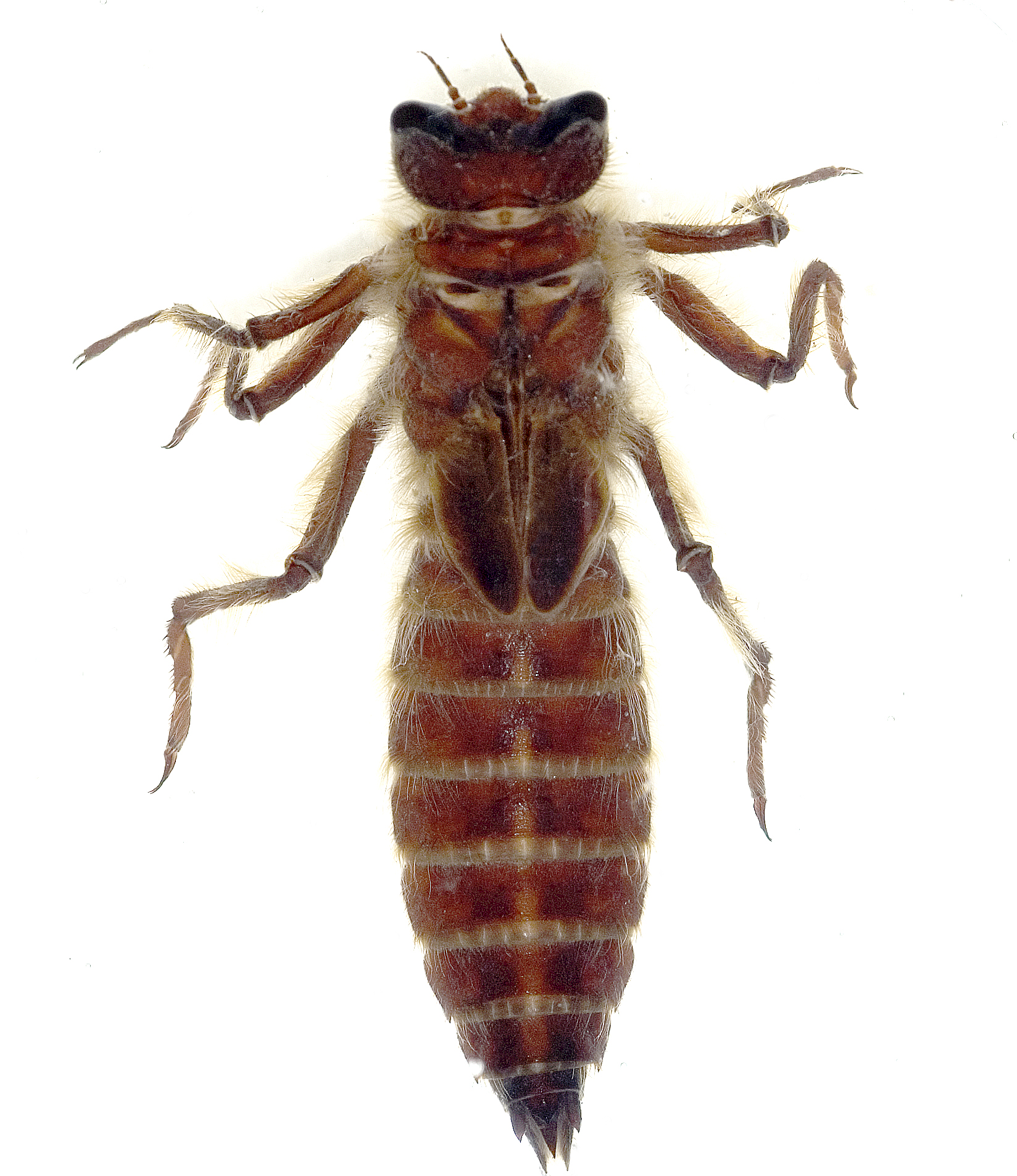
- Nymph of Neopetalia punctata

Scientific classification
- Kingdom: Animalia
- Phylum: Arthropoda
- Clade: Pancrustacea
- Class: Insecta
- Order: Odonata
- Infraorder: Anisoptera
- Clade: Cavilabiata
- Superfamily: Cordulegastroidea
- Family: Neopetaliidae; Tillyard and Fraser, 1940
- Genus: Neopetalia; Cowley, 1934

Species
- Neopetalia punctata (Hagen, 1854)
- Distribution of Neopetalia

= Neopetalia =

Genus of dragonflies

Neopetalia is a monotypic genus of dragonflies and the only genus in the family Neopetaliidae, which is placed in the superfamily Cordulegastroidea. Its only species, Neopetalia punctata, commonly known as the spotwing, is endemic to Chile.

Neopetalia punctata inhabits cool temperate forests of south-central Chile, where its larvae develop in spring-fed seeps and small forest streams. Adults are large, robust dragonflies with broad wings marked with distinctive dark reddish-brown spots. The species is assessed as Data Deficient by the IUCN.

== Description ==
The sole species, Neopetalia punctata, is a large, robust dragonfly with broad wings and a dark body marked with yellow. The wings have a series of dark reddish-brown spots along the leading edge, a characteristic shared with the related Australian members of the former Neopetaliidae.

Adults inhabit cool forest environments and spend much of their time flying beneath or above the forest canopy. Activity is greatest during sunny periods following cloud cover, while in prolonged sunshine adults often retreat into the canopy. At dawn and dusk they patrol along forest roads and streams a few metres above the ground.

The larvae inhabit spring-fed seeps, small forest streams and quiet silty pools, where they live partly buried in fine sediment as ambush predators. Larval development is thought to take about three years.

== Distribution and habitat ==
Neopetalia is restricted to south-central Chile, where its sole species occurs from near sea level to about 1,800 m elevation. It inhabits cool temperate forests, particularly around spring-fed seeps, small forest streams and quiet silty pools beneath dense forest canopy.

The larvae are found in fine sediment, often buried in the substrate of seepage areas and slow-flowing pools adjoining small streams. Although Neopetalia punctata has a relatively broad geographic range, suitable breeding habitat is highly localised.

== Behaviour and life cycle ==
Adults spend much of their time flying above spring seeps and beneath the forest canopy, becoming most active during sunny periods following cloud cover. After prolonged sunshine they often retreat high into the forest, while at dawn and dusk both sexes patrol along forest roads and streams a few metres above the ground.

The larvae are ambush predators that remain buried in fine sediment with only the eyes and tip of the abdomen exposed. They feed primarily on mayfly larvae, and their development is thought to take about three years.

Females oviposit by hovering over the water surface and repeatedly striking it with the tip of the abdomen while releasing eggs. The expanded terminal abdominal plate, unique among dragonflies, is thought to assist in dispersing the egg mass across the water surface.

== Family classification ==
The species was first described in 1854 as Petalia punctata in the collaborative monograph Monographie des Caloptérygines by Selys with Hagen. Within the work, the new genus Petalia and its only species are explicitly attributed to Hagen. Modern catalogues differ in how they cite the authorship, with some attributing the species simply to Hagen, while others use the citation "Hagen in Selys, 1854". In 1934, John Cowley transferred the species to his newly established genus Neopetalia.

Tillyard and Fraser established the subfamily Neopetalinae in 1940 to accommodate Neopetalia and several related genera from South America and Australia. Fraser retained this arrangement in his later classifications. By 1971 the group was being treated as the family Neopetaliidae in catalogues, although the first publication to adopt family rank has not been identified. In 1994, F. L. Carle and J. A. Louton revised the family, transferring the Australian and most South American genera to the newly established family Austropetaliidae, leaving Neopetalia as the sole genus of Neopetaliidae.

Molecular phylogenetic studies now place Neopetaliidae as one of the three extant families of the superfamily Cordulegastroidea, together with Chlorogomphidae and Cordulegastridae.

== Etymology ==
The family name Neopetaliidae is derived from the type genus Neopetalia, with the zoological suffix -idae denoting a family.

The genus name Neopetalia combines the Greek νέος (néos, "new") with Petalia, the original genus in which the species was described by Hagen in 1854. Cowley introduced the replacement name Neopetalia in 1934.

The species name punctata is Latin for "spotted", referring to the distinctive series of dark spots along the leading edge of the wings.
