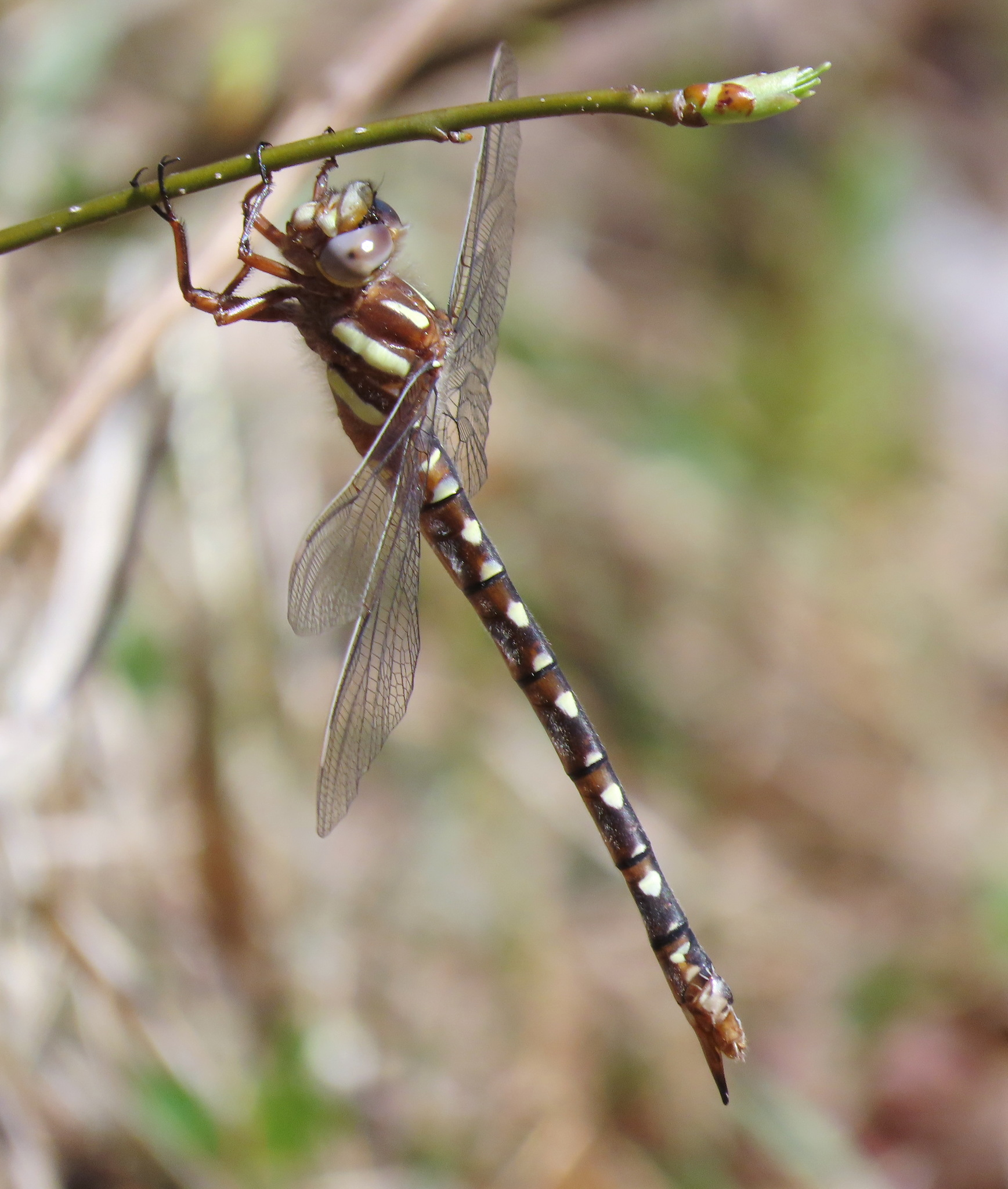
- Zoraena maculata, Virginia

Scientific classification
- Kingdom: Animalia
- Phylum: Arthropoda
- Clade: Pancrustacea
- Class: Insecta
- Order: Odonata
- Infraorder: Anisoptera
- Family: Cordulegastridae
- Genus: Zoraena; Kirby, 1890

= Zoraena =

Genus of dragonflies

Zoraena is a genus in the dragonfly family Cordulegastridae. There are about nine described species in Zoraena, found in North America.

== Species ==
These species belong to the genus Zoraena:

- Zoraena bilineata Carle, 1983 (brown spiketail)
- Zoraena diastatops (Selys, 1854) (delta-spotted spiketail)
- Zoraena dorsalis (Hagen in Selys, 1858) (Pacific spiketail)
- Zoraena erronea (Selys, 1878) (tiger spiketail)
- Zoraena maculata (Selys, 1854) (twin-spotted spiketail)
- Zoraena obliqua (Say, 1840) (arrowhead spiketail)
- Zoraena sarracenia (Abbott & Hibbitts, 2011) (sarracenia spiketail)
- Zoraena sayi (Selys, 1854) (Say's spiketail)
- Zoraena talaria (Tennessen, 2004) (Ouachita spiketail)
