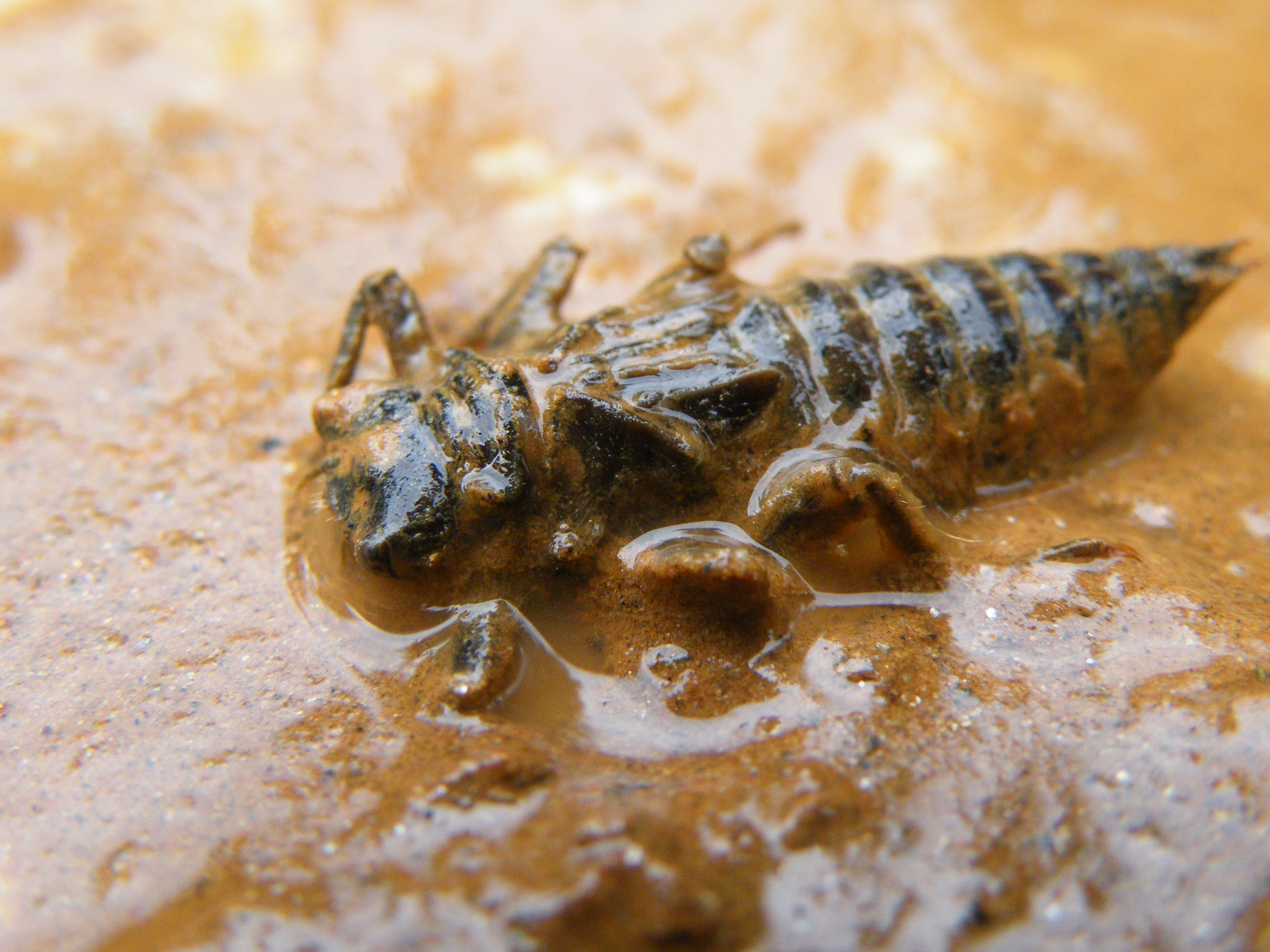
- Cordulegaster heros, Balkan Goldenring

Scientific classification
- Kingdom: Animalia
- Phylum: Arthropoda
- Clade: Pancrustacea
- Class: Insecta
- Order: Odonata
- Infraorder: Anisoptera
- Superfamily: Cordulegastroidea
- Family: Cordulegastridae
- Genus: Cordulegaster; Leach in Brewster, 1815

Synonyms
- Cordrulegaster Brauner, 1902; Cordylegaster Billberg, 1820; Cordylogaster Agassiz, 1846; Zoraena Kirby, 1890

= Cordulegaster =

Genus of dragonflies

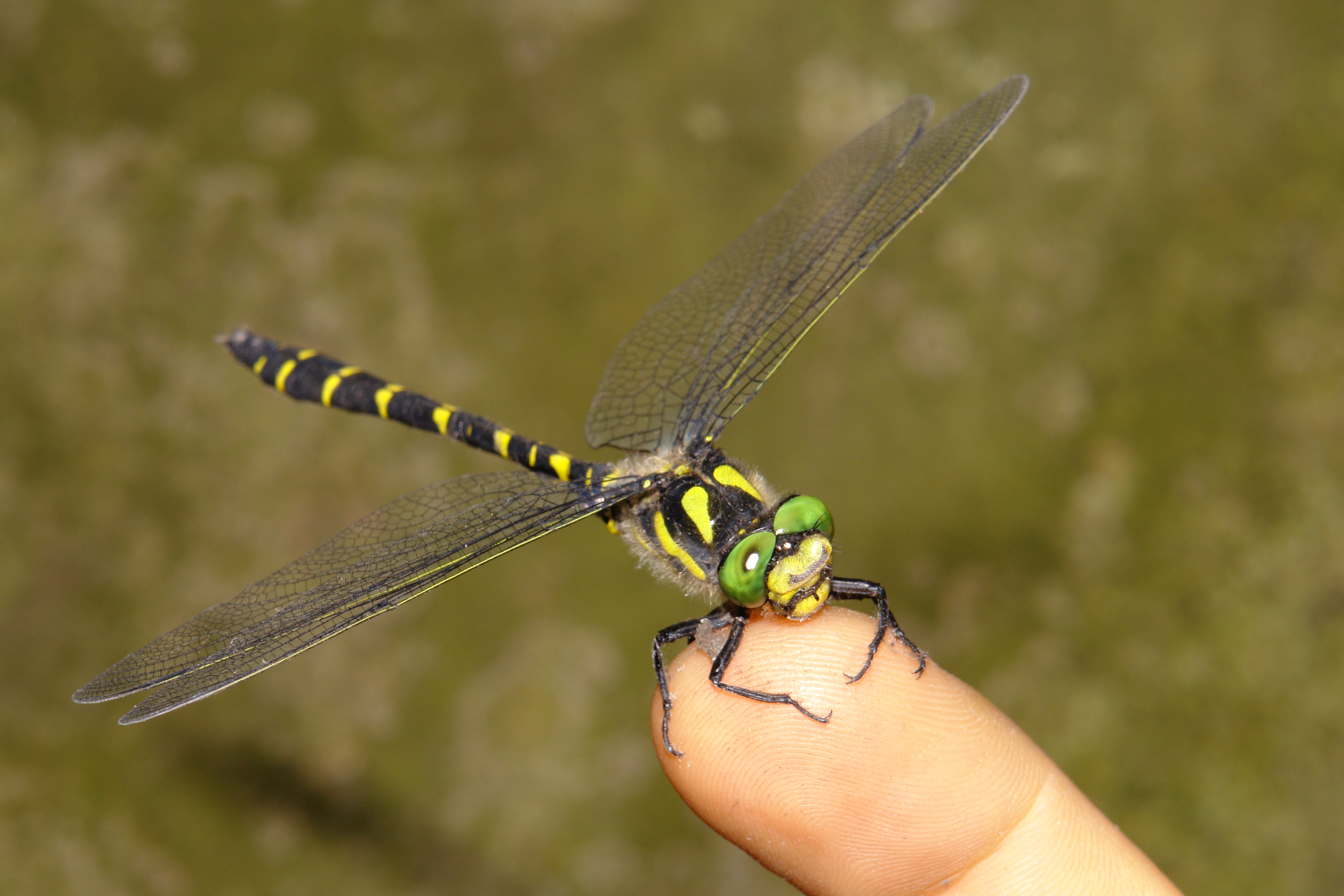
Cordulegaster heros, Balkan Goldenring

Cordulegaster is a genus of golden-ringed dragonflies in the family Cordulegastridae. There are about 10 described species in Cordulegaster, found mainly in North America, Europe, and Asia.

In accordance with research published in 2024, the species bidentata, helladica, and mzymtae were moved from the genus Cordulegaster to Thecagaster, and bilineata, diastatops, dorsalis, erronea, maculata, obliqua, and sayi were moved to the genus Zoraena.

== Etymology ==
The genus name Cordulegaster is presumed to be derived from the Greek κορδύλη (kordylē, "club") and γαστήρ (gastēr, "belly" or "abdomen").

== Species ==
The following species are currently placed in Cordulegaster:

- Cordulegaster boltonii (Donovan, 1807) (common goldenring)
- Cordulegaster diadema Selys, 1868 (apache spiketail)
- Cordulegaster heros Theischinger, 1979 (balkan goldenring)
- Cordulegaster kalkmani Schneider et al., 2021
- Cordulegaster parvistigma (Selys, 1873)
- Cordulegaster picta Selys, 1854 (Turkish goldenring)
- Cordulegaster princeps Morton, 1916 (atlas goldenring)
- Cordulegaster trinacriae Waterston, 1976 (Italian goldenring)
- Cordulegaster vanbrinkae Lohmann, 1993
- Cordulegaster virginiae Novelo-Gutiérrez, 2018 (cloudforest spiketail)
