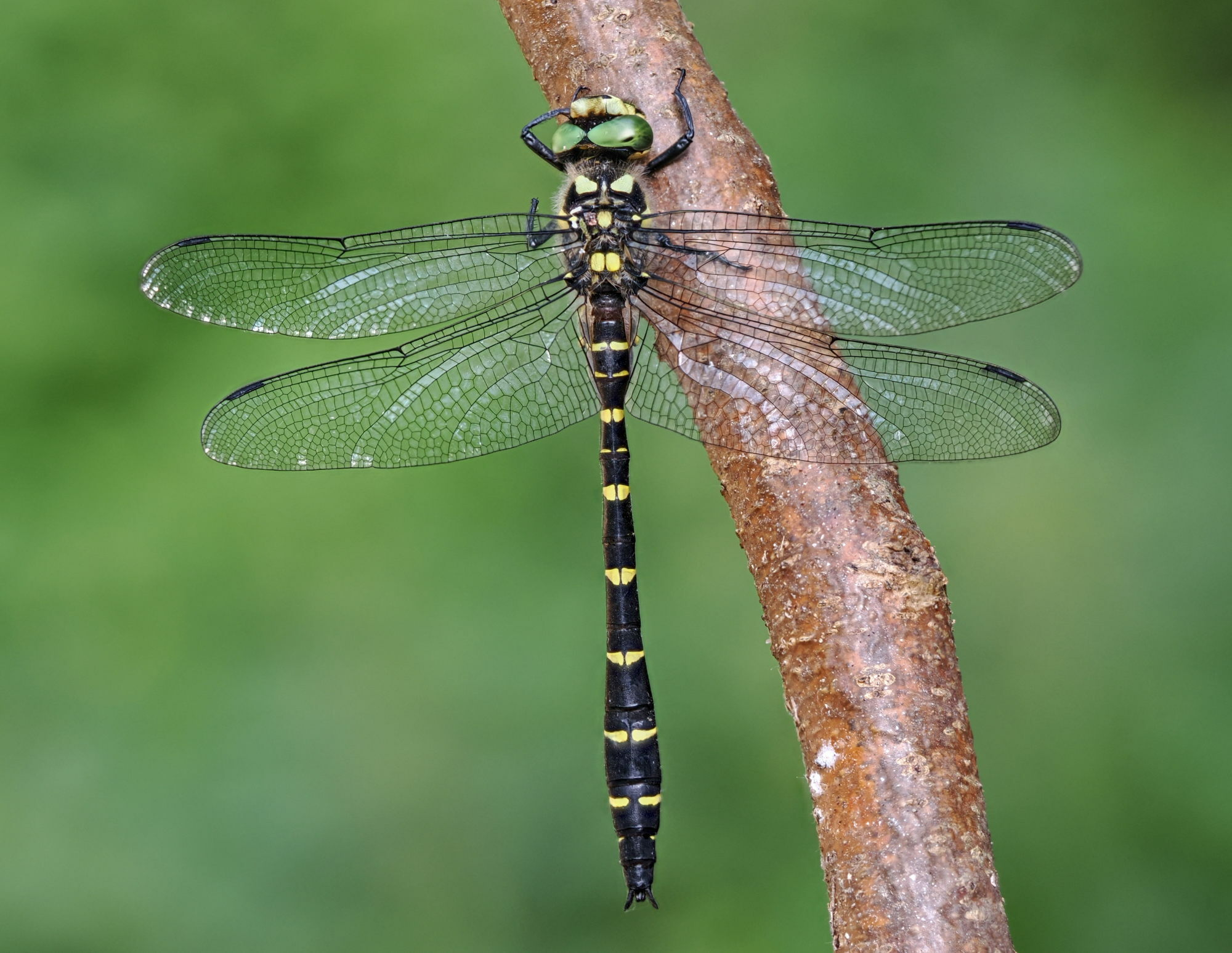
- Thecagaster bidentata, Italy

Scientific classification
- Kingdom: Animalia
- Phylum: Arthropoda
- Clade: Pancrustacea
- Class: Insecta
- Order: Odonata
- Infraorder: Anisoptera
- Family: Cordulegastridae
- Genus: Thecagaster; Selys, 1854

= Thecagaster =

Genus of dragonflies

Thecagaster is a genus of the dragonfly family Cordulegastridae. There are about 11 described species in Thecagaster, found in Europe and Asia.

== Species ==
These species belong to the genus Thecagaster:

- Thecagaster amasina (Morton, 1916)
- Thecagaster bidentata (Selys, 1843)
- Thecagaster brevistigma Selys, 1854
- Thecagaster buchholzi (Lohmann, 1993)
- Thecagaster charpentieri (Kolenati, 1846)
- Thecagaster cilicia (Schneider et al, 2021)
- Thecagaster coronata (Morton, 1916)
- Thecagaster helladica (Lohmann, 1993)
- Thecagaster insignis (Schneider, 1845)
- Thecagaster mzymtae (Bartenev, 1929)
- Thecagaster pekinensis (Selys, 1886)
