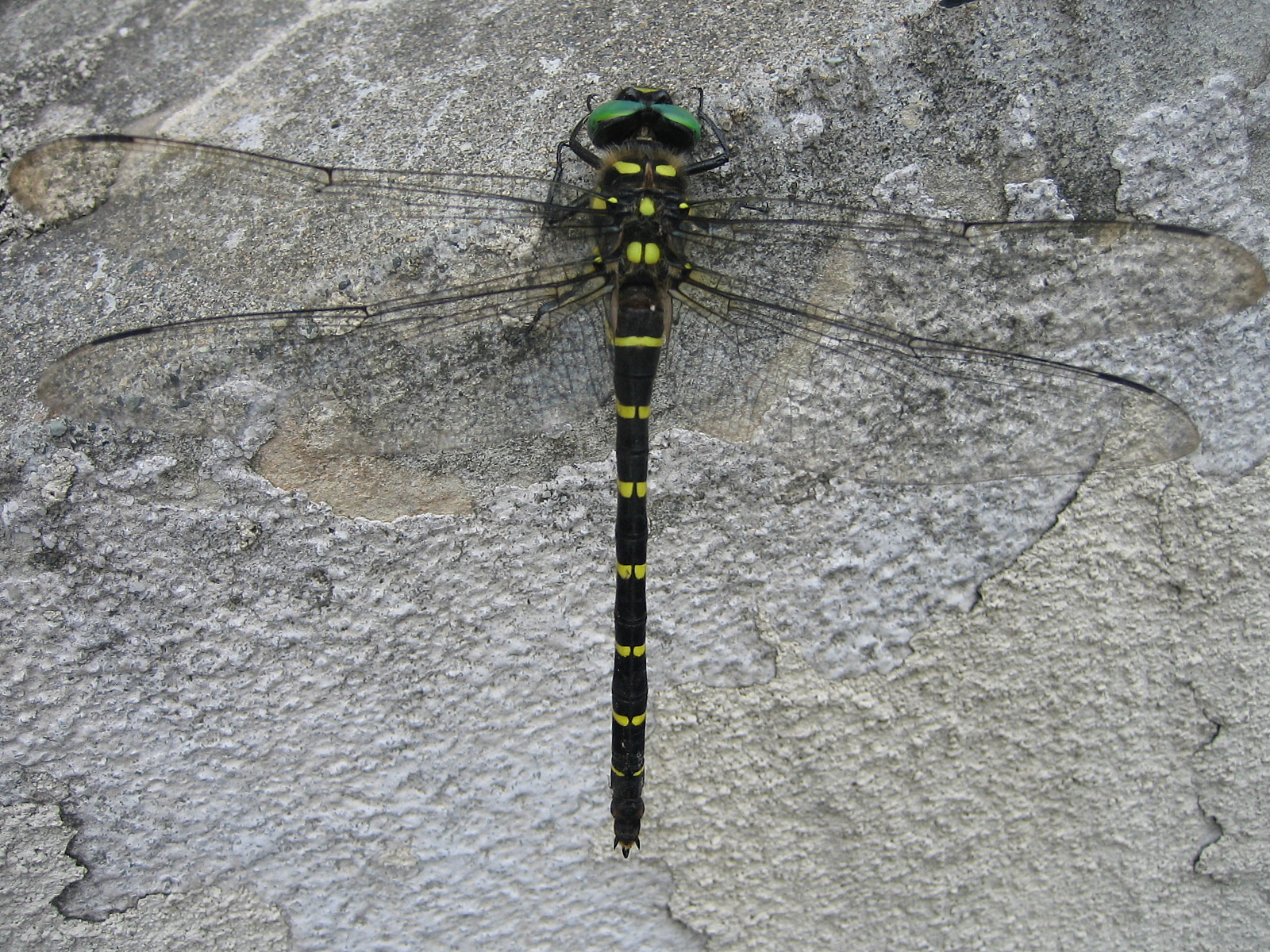
- Adult

Conservation status
- Least Concern (IUCN 3.1)

Scientific classification
- Kingdom: Animalia
- Phylum: Arthropoda
- Class: Insecta
- Order: Odonata
- Infraorder: Anisoptera
- Family: Cordulegastridae
- Genus: Anotogaster
- Species: A. sieboldii

Binomial name
- Anotogaster sieboldii Sélys, 1854

= Anotogaster sieboldii =

Species of dragonfly

Anotogaster sieboldii, as known as golden-ringed dragonfly, jumbo dragonfly, Siebold's dragonfly or oniyanma (オニヤンマ、鬼蜻蜓、馬大頭) in Japanese, 無霸勾蜓 in Chinese and 장수잠자리 ("jang-su-jamjari", means 'General Dragonfly') in Korean is the largest species of dragonfly native to Eastern Asia, especially Japan, Taiwan, China, Korean Peninsula. It can grow between 95 and 100 mm in length.

== Life cycle ==
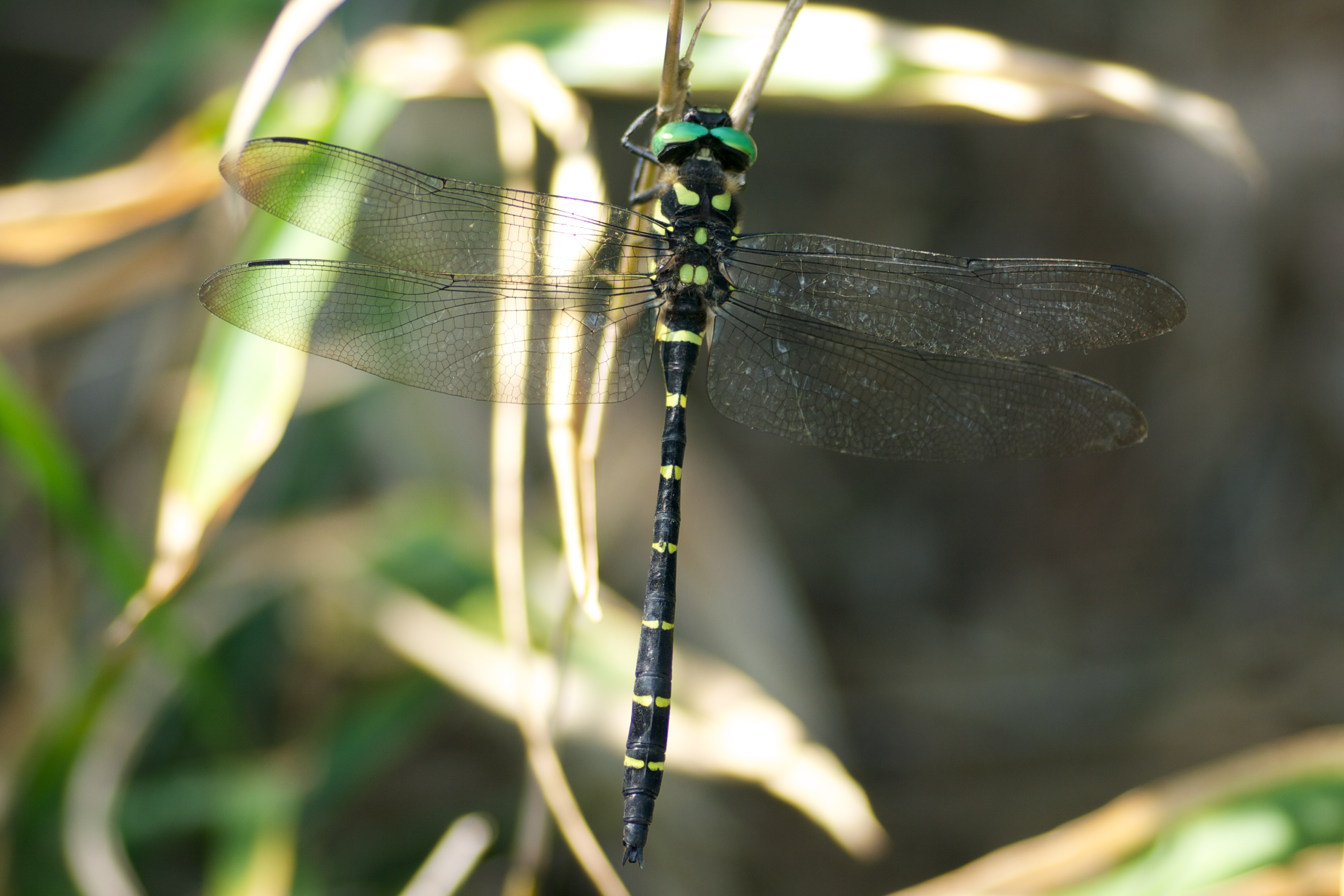
An adult on a twig. photographed in Nasu Highlands of Tochigi, Japan

Eggs hatch within a month of being laid. Nymphs can live for three to five years, moulting as many as ten times and growing as large as five centimeters in length. Like adult dragonfly, nymphs are predatory insects. Once nymphs reach sufficient size, they hunt tadpoles, aquatic insects and small fish. The adult dragonfly mate and lay eggs within one to two months of metamorphosis. After mating, females head toward small creeks or ponds, not fast-moving rivers or lakes, to lay eggs. They will sometimes fly perpendicularly to the water, laying their eggs in mud or sand under the surface.

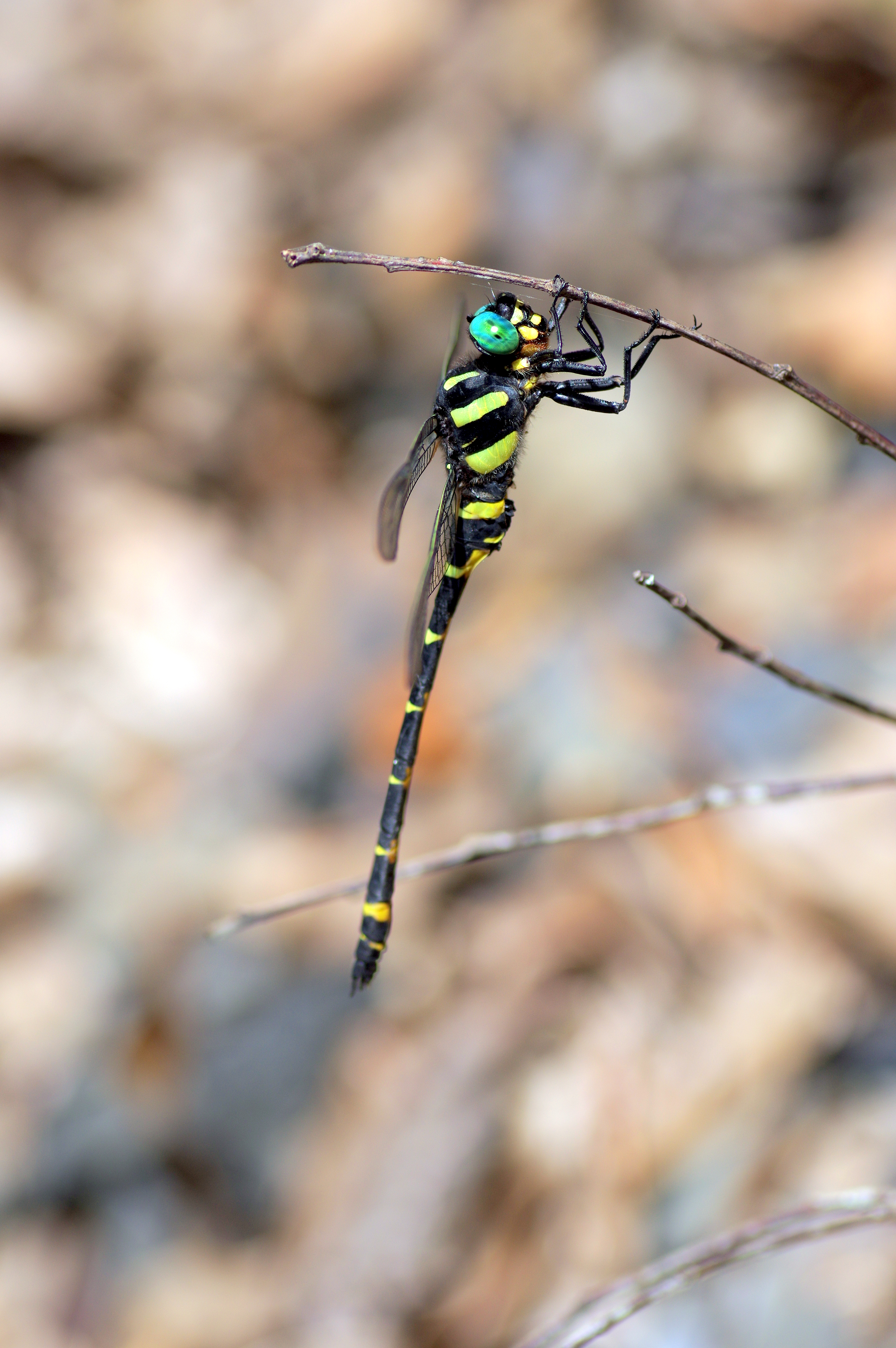
Anotogaster sieboldii

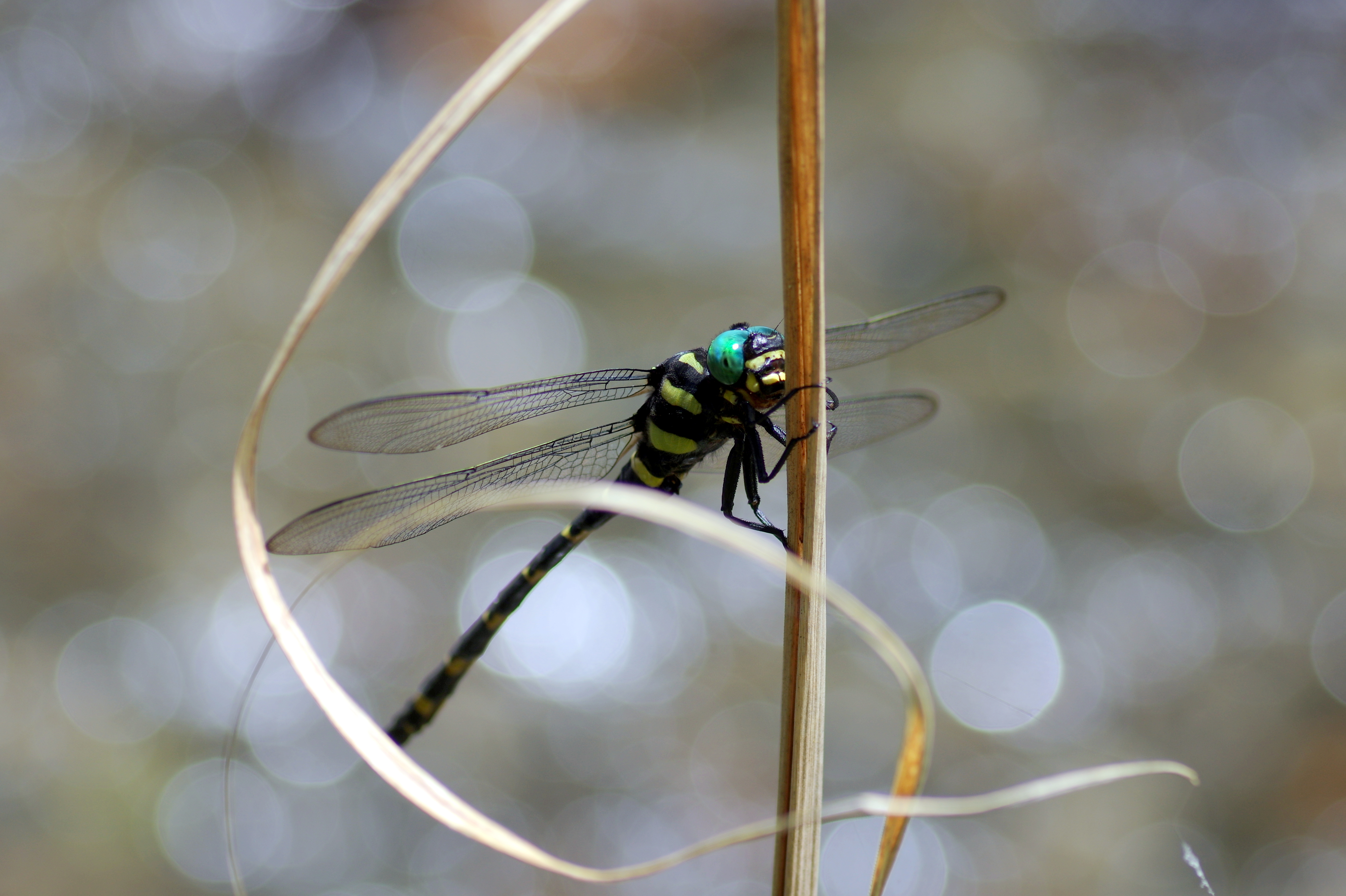
Anotogaster sieboldii

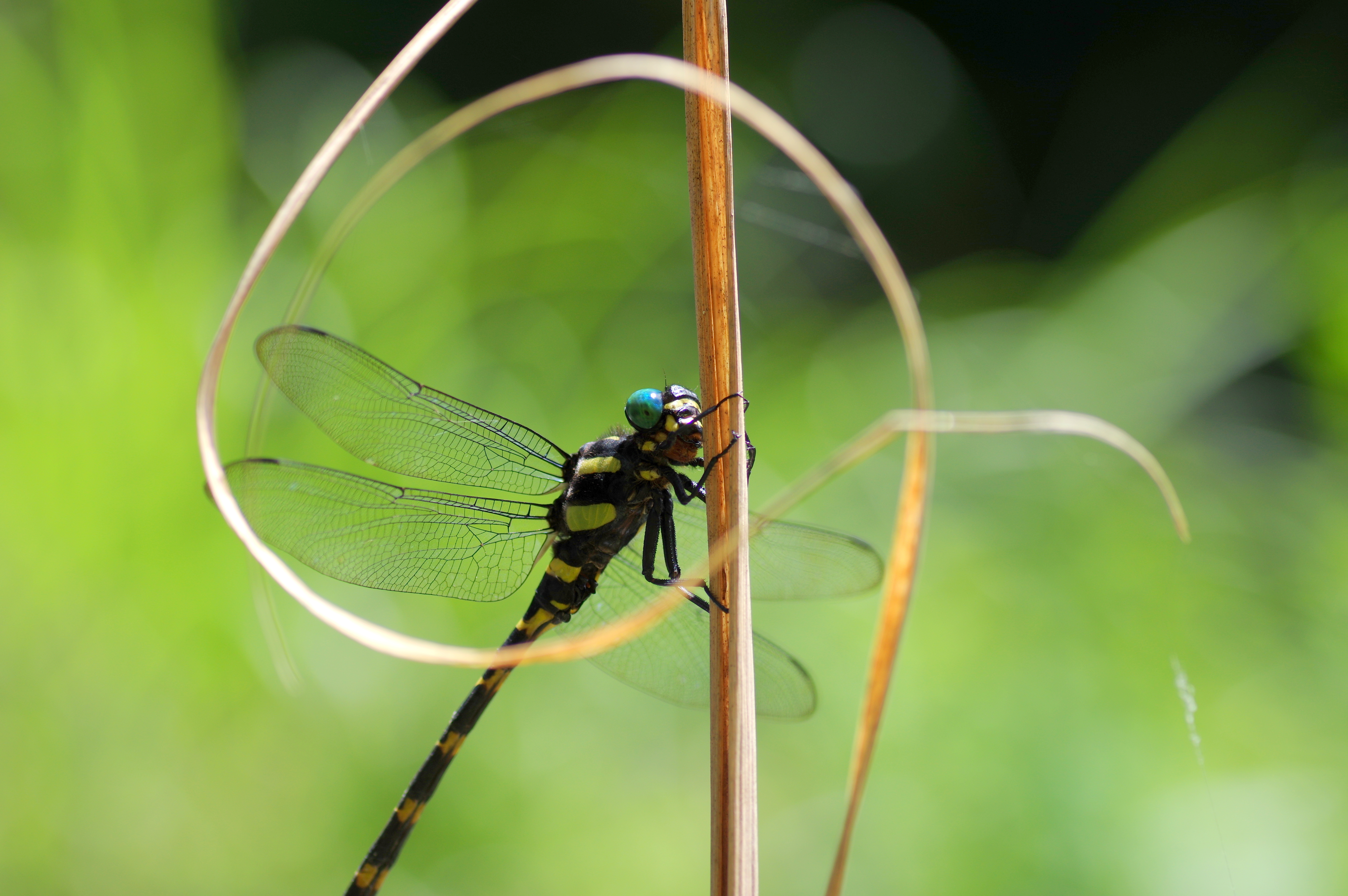
Anotogaster sieboldii
