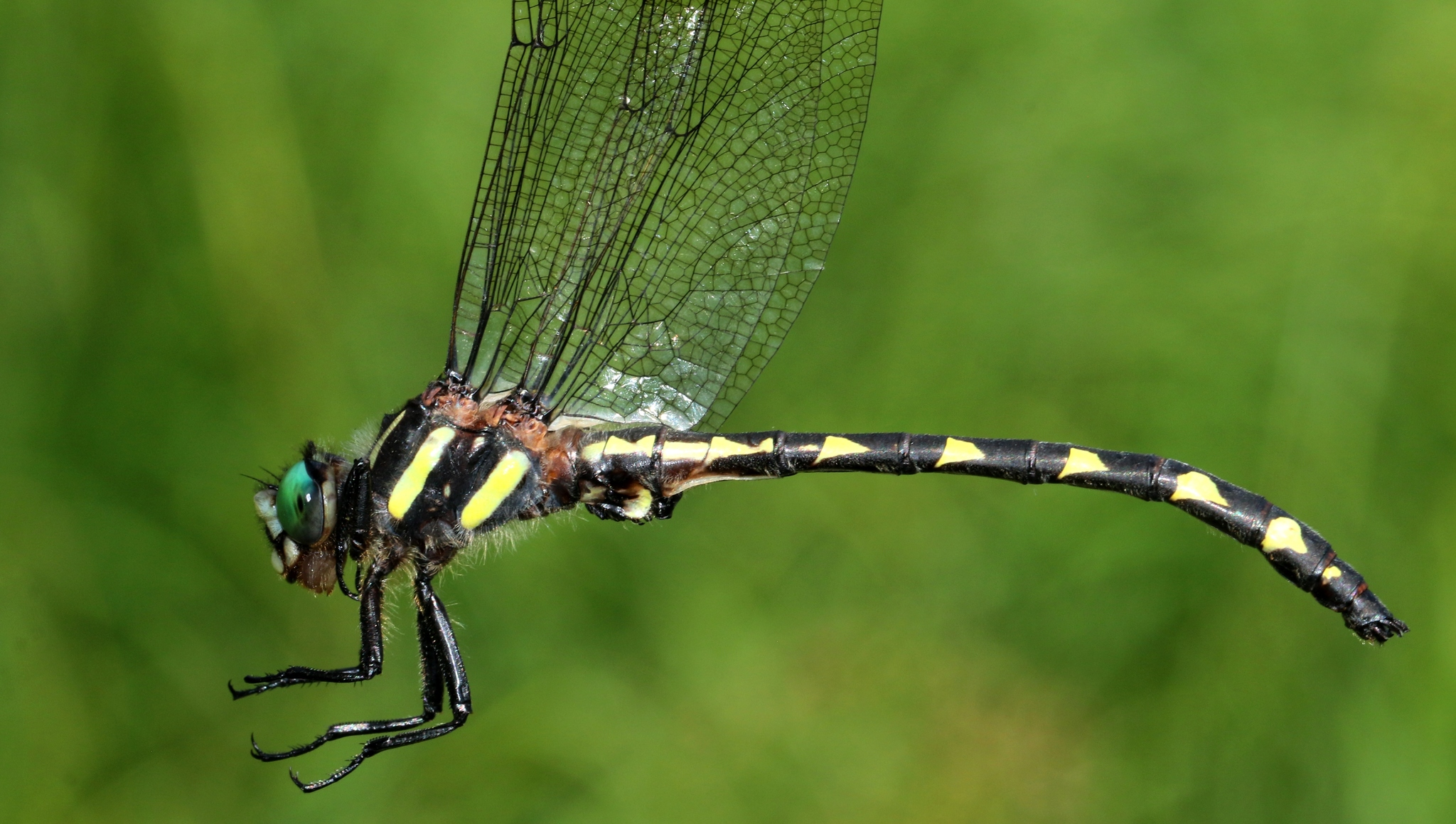
- Delta-spotted spiketail (Cordulegaster diastatops)

Scientific classification
- Kingdom: Animalia
- Phylum: Arthropoda
- Clade: Pancrustacea
- Class: Insecta
- Order: Odonata
- Infraorder: Anisoptera
- Clade: Cavilabiata
- Superfamily: Cordulegastroidea; Selys, 1854

Families
- Chlorogomphidae; Cordulegastridae; Neopetaliidae
- Distribution of Cordulegastroidea

= Cordulegastroidea =

Cordulegastroidea Temporal range: Barremian to present Possible Late Jurassic record

Superfamily of dragonflies

Cordulegastroidea is a superfamily of dragonflies comprising the families Chlorogomphidae, Cordulegastridae and Neopetaliidae.

The superfamily includes both living and extinct lineages, with fossils known from the Late Jurassic (possibly) and the Early Cretaceous.

== Taxonomic history ==
Selys established the suprageneric taxon Cordulegaster as the fourth legion of the Gomphines in his Synopsis des Gomphines (1854).

Hagen later recognised the group as the subfamily Cordulegasterina. Modern authorities differ in their attribution of the superfamily name: the World Odonata List follows Selys (1854), whereas Dijkstra et al. (2013) attribute Cordulegastroidea to Hagen (1875) and Carter et al. (2026) attribute it to Hagen (1877).

Modern classifications place three living families in the superfamily: Chlorogomphidae, Cordulegastridae and Neopetaliidae.

== Phylogeny ==
Phylogenetic studies generally support Cordulegastroidea as a monophyletic group comprising Chlorogomphidae, Cordulegastridae and Neopetaliidae.

Within modern dragonflies, Cordulegastroidea is generally recovered as the sister group to Libelluloidea.

== Families ==
The following families are currently placed in Cordulegastroidea:

- Chlorogomphidae Needham, 1903
- Cordulegastridae Hagen, 1875
- Neopetaliidae Tillyard & Fraser, 1940

== Fossil record ==
The oldest confirmed fossils assigned to Cordulegastroidea belong to the extinct families Mesochlorogomphidae and Araripechlorogomphidae, which are regarded as close relatives of the Chlorogomphidae.

In a phylogenetic classification proposed by Bechly in 1996, Cordulegastroidea and related extinct stem groups were placed in the broader group Chlorogomphida.

The family Hemeroscopidae may also belong to this lineage, but its placement remains uncertain.

== Etymology ==
The superfamily name Cordulegastroidea is derived from the type genus Cordulegaster and the zoological suffix -oidea, used for superfamilies.

The genus name Cordulegaster is presumably derived from the Greek κορδύλη (kordylē, "club") and γαστήρ (gastēr, "belly" or "abdomen").

== See also ==
- List of dragonflies of the world
