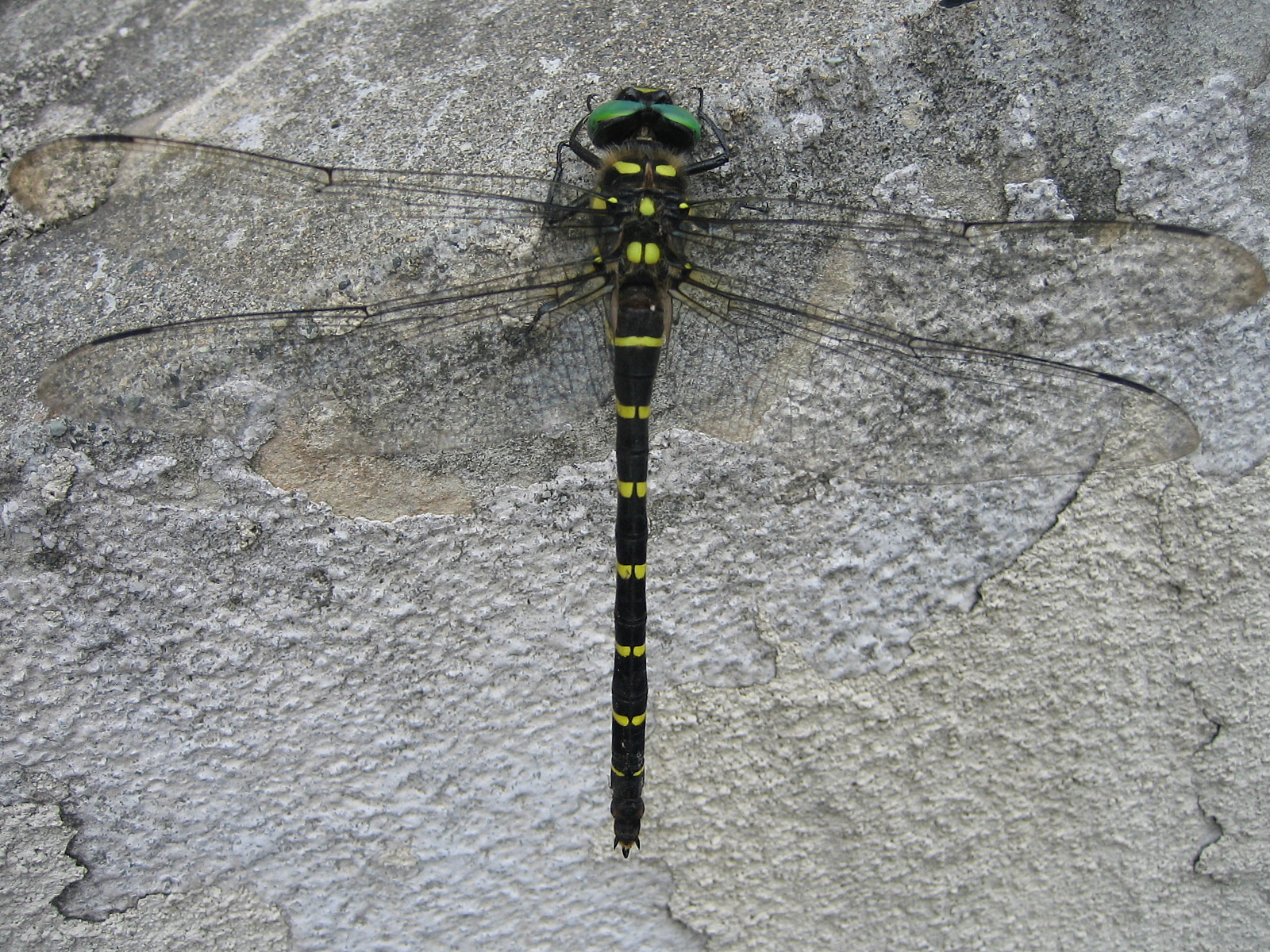
- Anotogaster sieboldii

Scientific classification
- Kingdom: Animalia
- Phylum: Arthropoda
- Clade: Pancrustacea
- Class: Insecta
- Order: Odonata
- Infraorder: Anisoptera
- Superfamily: Cordulegastroidea
- Family: Cordulegastridae; Selys, 1854

Genera
- Anotogaster; Cordulegaster; Neallogaster; Thecagaster; Zoraena

= Cordulegastridae =

Family of dragonflies

The Cordulegastridae are a family of Odonata (dragonflies) from the suborder Anisoptera. They are commonly known as spiketails. Some vernacular names for the species of this family are biddie and flying adder. They have large, brown or black bodies with yellow markings, and narrow unpatterned wings. Their bright eyes touch at a single point, and they can be found along small, clear, woodland streams, flying slowly 30 to 70 cm above the water. When disturbed, however, they can fly very rapidly. They usually hunt high in forest vegetation, and prefer to capture prey resting on leaves or branches (known as gleaning).

== Description ==
Dragonflies within this family are typically large, between 2.5 and 3 inches long. They are characteristically black in color and have blue-green eyes. On their large black bodies they have paired yellow spots along the length of their abdomen. Females and males are generally similar but two key differences are the color of the forehead and the terminal segment of their abdomen. Males have yellow foreheads and slightly clubbed abdomen whereas females have brown foreheads and an ovipositor extending from the end of the abdomen.

== Genera ==
The following genera are currently placed in Cordulegastridae:

- Anotogaster Selys, 1854
- Cordulegaster Leach, 1815
- Neallogaster Cowley, 1934
- Thecagaster Selys, 1854
- Zoraena Kirby, 1890

== Taxonomy ==
The type genus Cordulegaster was described by William Elford Leach in 1815 for a group of large dragonflies distinguished by their elongated abdomen and prominent ovipositor.

The World Odonata List treats the authorship of Cordulegastridae as Selys, 1854. Selys established the suprageneric taxon Cordulegaster as the fourth legion of the Gomphines in his Synopsis des Gomphines (1854).

Hagen later recognised the group as the subfamily Cordulegasterina in 1875. Modern authorities differ in their interpretation of the family-group authorship: the World Odonata List follows Selys (1854), whereas Dijkstra et al. (2013) and Carter et al. (2026) attribute the family to Hagen (1875).

== Natural history ==
=== Life cycle and behavior ===
A typical lifespan of Cordulegastridae dragonflies is 3–5 years. Adults are usually active and flying between spring and early summer with a peak in June.

The Cordulegastridae usually lay their eggs in the sand in shallow water, the female hovering just above the water with her body in a vertical position, and making repeated dips into the water with her abdomen. The females trap air bubbles with hairs along their bodies to allow them to reach the bottom of the water and deposit eggs into the substrate. Males are remarkably territorial and their territorial behavior varies based on the oviposition of the females.

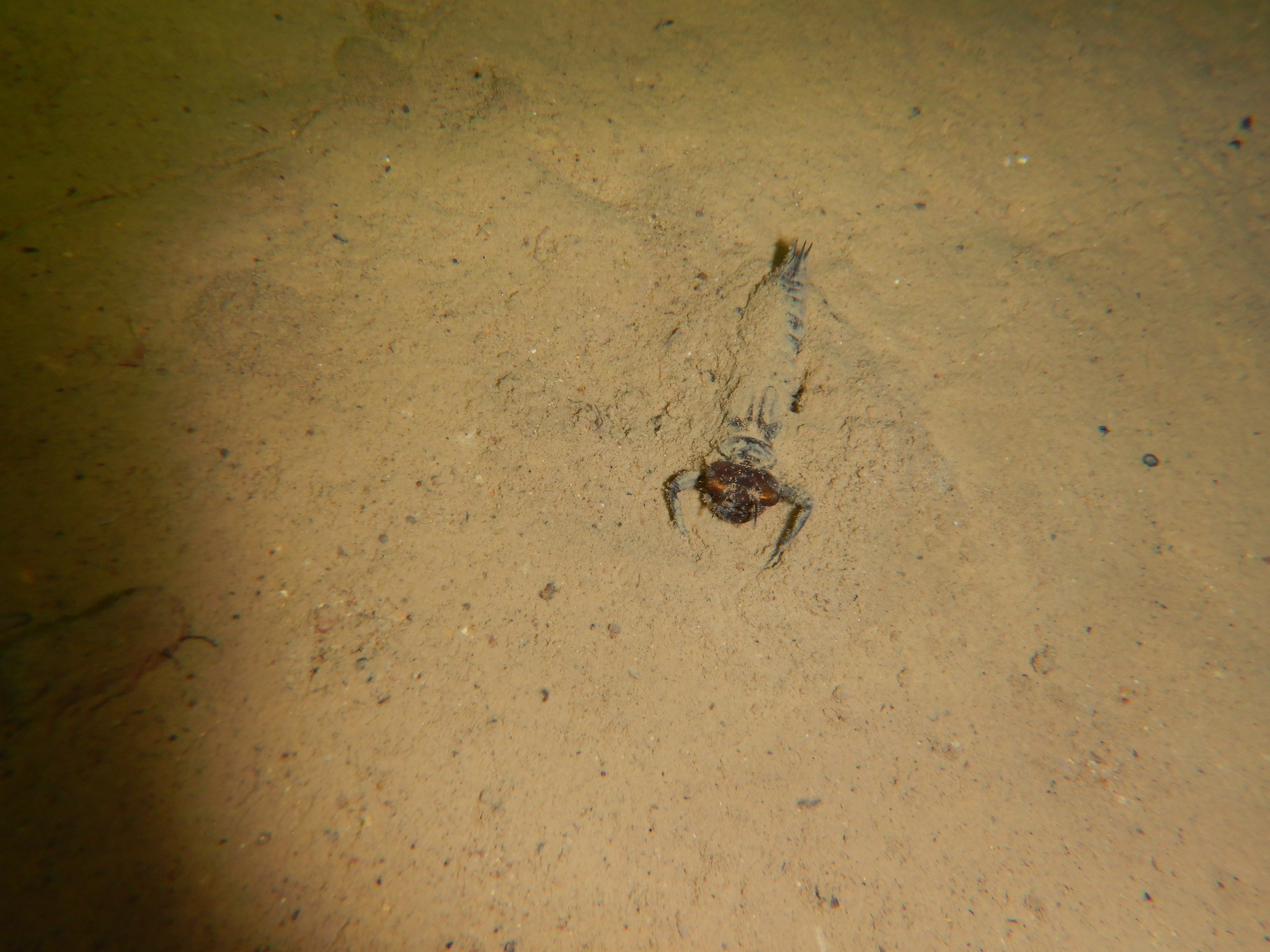
Cordulegastridae nymph buried in substrate

Cordulegastridae nymphs will almost entirely conceal themselves in sand or silt, exposing only their eyes to see, antennae for sensing prey, and the tip of their abdomen to breathe dissolved oxygen. Nymphs will consume any prey they can capture, going as far as eating smaller larvae of the same species. This family captures their prey by extending their labium, categorizing them as ambush predators.

=== Habitat ===
Since nymphs are aquatic and adults are terrestrial, their habitats are quite different. The preferred habitat of Cordulegastridae nymphs are small lotic or flowing streams with clean sand and silt substrates. Adults on the other hand fly above clear streams and small rivers in the woods, with females only entering the water to lay their eggs.

== Distribution ==
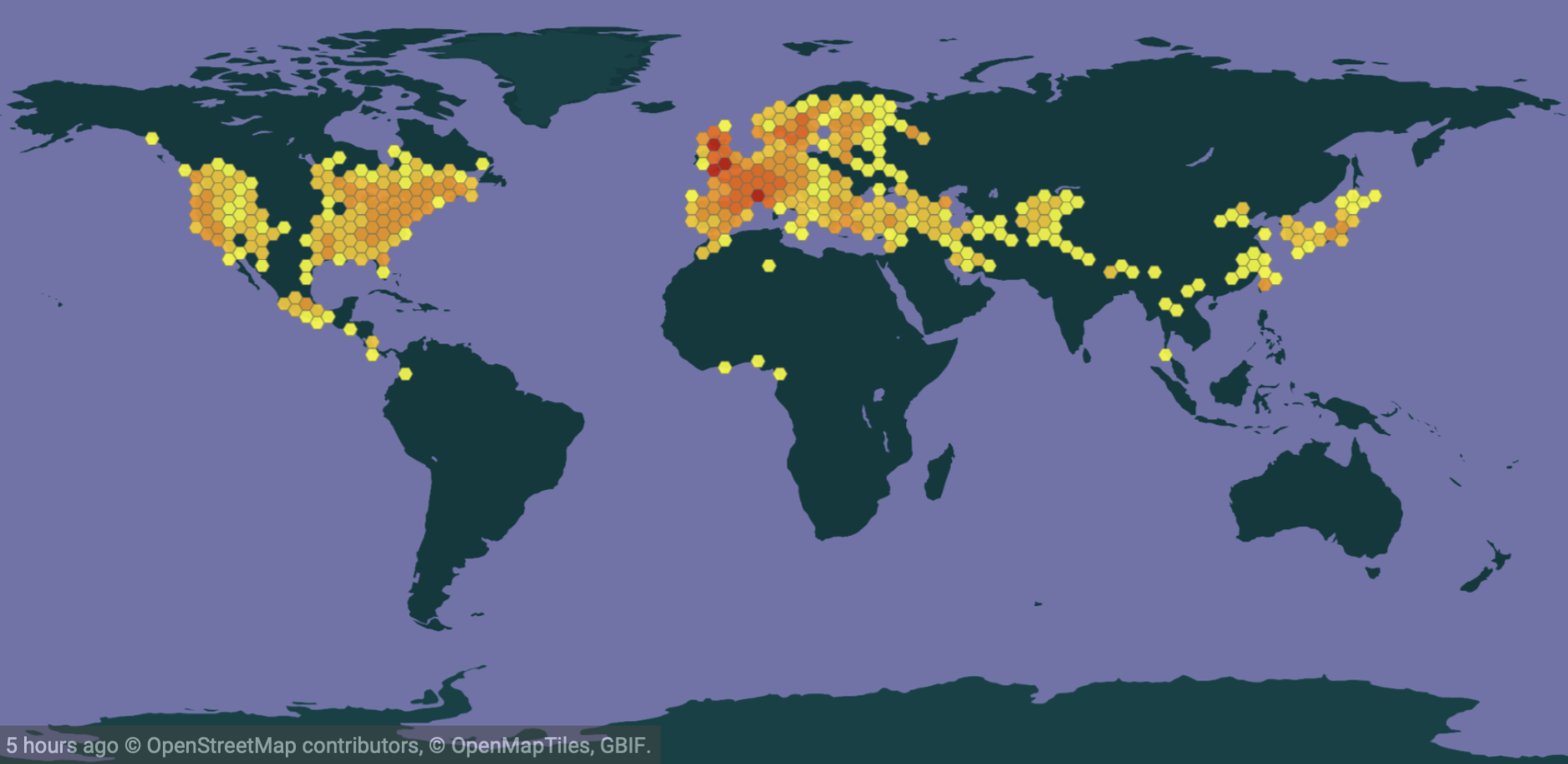
Map showing the frequency of reported Cordulegastridae dragonfly sightings around the globe.

Their distribution includes North America, South America, Europe, Asia and Africa. All eight species in North America belong to the genus Cordulegaster.

== Conservation ==
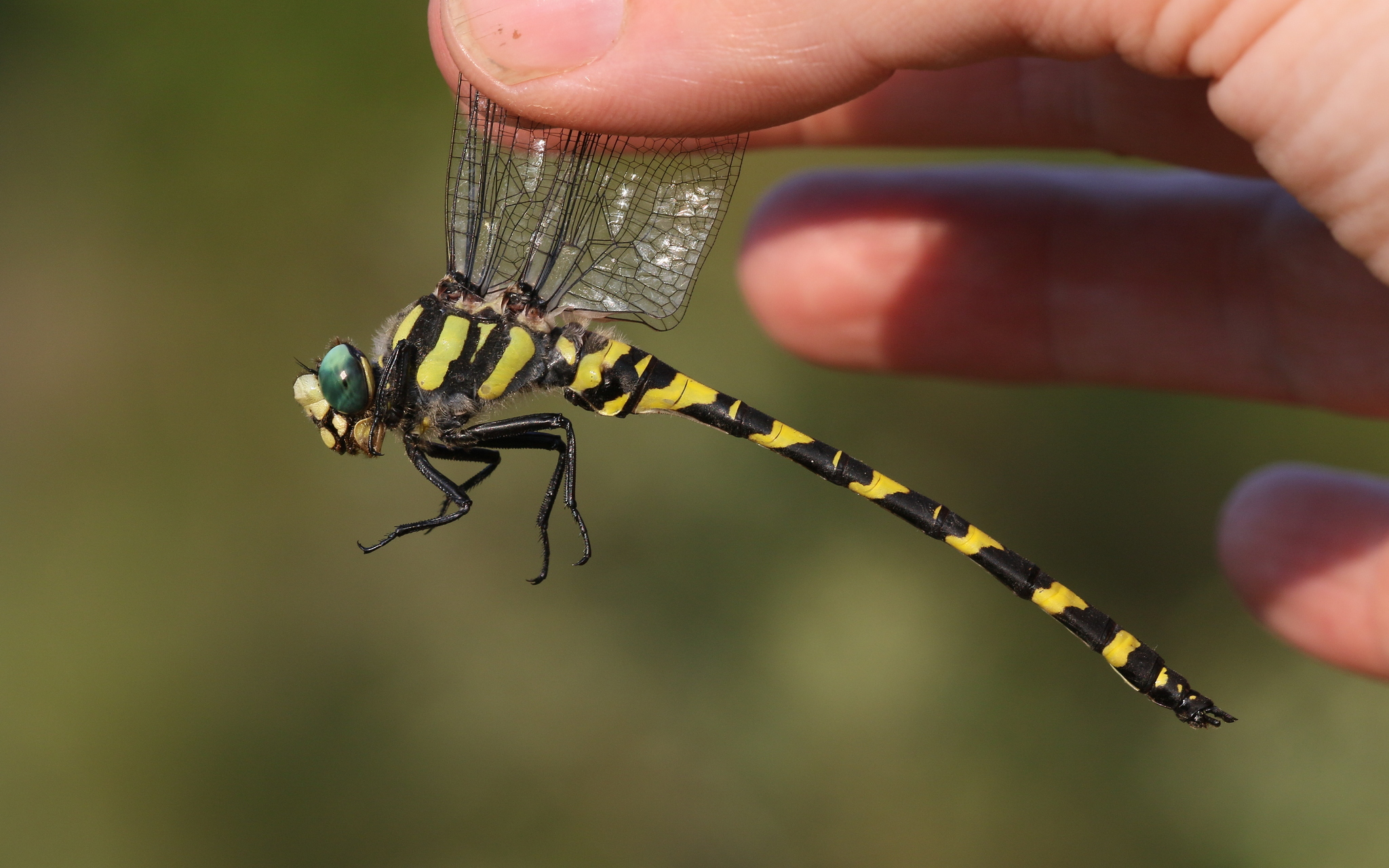
The endangered Cordulegaster helladica endemic to Greece

Although the conservation status of many, if not most, species of this family is unknown, there are multiple species that are of concern. From the Conservation Status Assessment of Odonata for the Northeastern United States, Cordulegaster erronea and Cordulegaster bilineata were identified as highly vulnerable, and Cordulegaster obliqua was identified as moderately vulnerable. There are several European species of concern according to the International Union for Conservation of Nature and Natural Resources (IUCN), including Cordulegaster trinacriae, Thecagaster bidentata, Thecagaster helladica and Zoraena sarracenia.

== Etymology ==
The name Cordulegastridae presumably comes from the Greek kordylinus, 'club-shaped' and gaster, belly. The common name spiketails refers to the females' prominent ovipositors.
