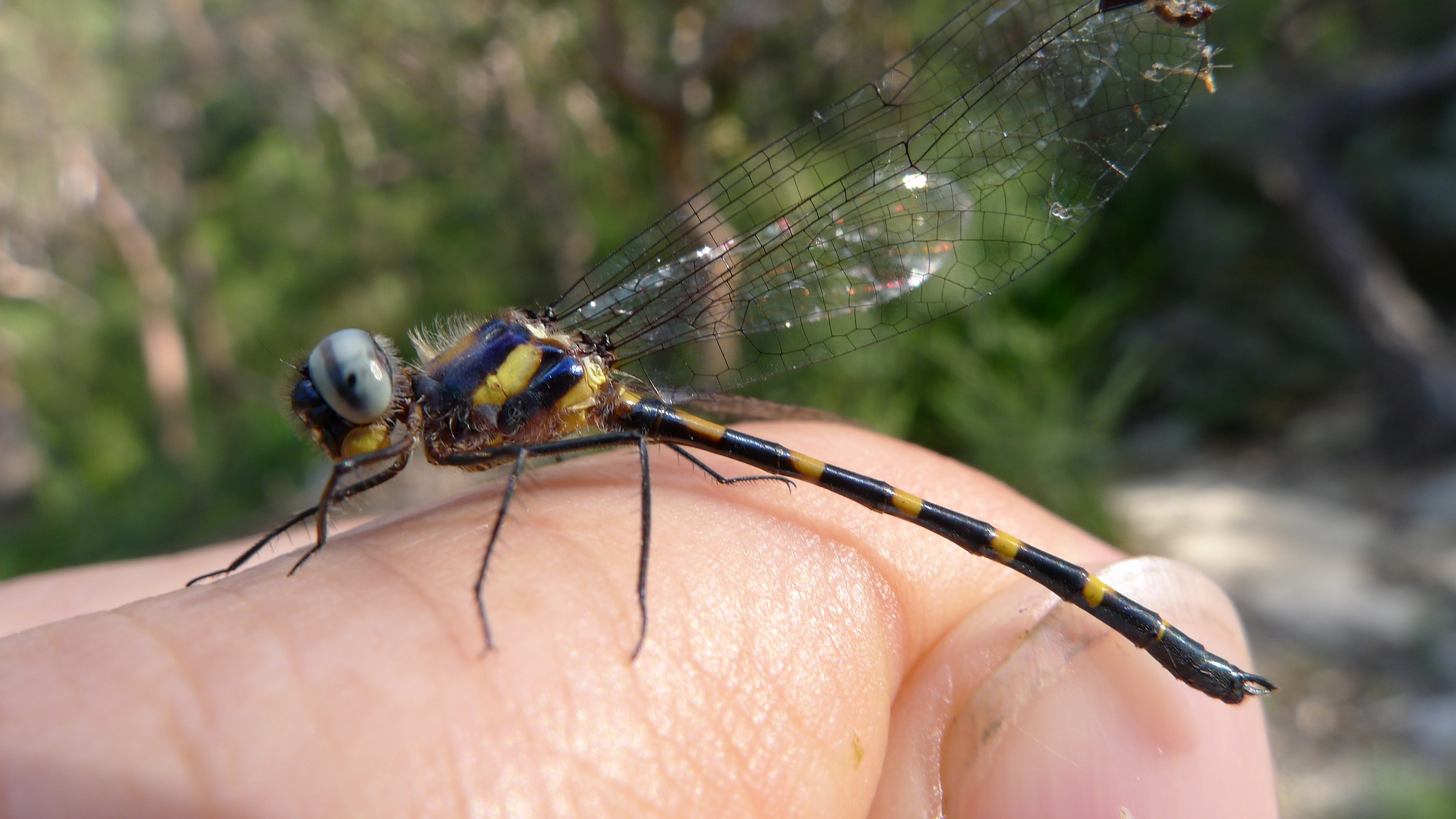
- Male

Conservation status
- Least Concern (IUCN 3.1)

Scientific classification
- Kingdom: Animalia
- Phylum: Arthropoda
- Clade: Pancrustacea
- Class: Insecta
- Order: Odonata
- Suborder: Anisoptera
- Superfamily: Libelluloidea
- Family: Austrocorduliidae
- Genus: Cordulephya
- Species: C. pygmaea

Binomial name
- Cordulephya pygmaea Selys, 1870
- Range in eastern Australia

= Cordulephya pygmaea =

Common shutwing

Species of dragonfly

Cordulephya pygmaea is a species of dragonfly in the family Austrocorduliidae, and is commonly known as the common shutwing. It is endemic to eastern Australia, where it inhabits streams.

It is small to tiny in size, black or purplish-black with yellowish markings. Unusually for Anisoptera, it rests with its wings folded above its body in a similar manner to many damselflies.

== Etymology ==
The genus name Cordulephya combines Cordulia, a genus name derived from the Greek κορδύλη (kordylē, "club" or "cudgel"), with Greek φυή (phyē, "form", "stature" or "growth"), thus meaning "having the form of Cordulia".

The species name pygmaea is derived from the Greek πυγμαῖος (pygmaios, "pygmy" or "dwarf"), referring to its small size.

== Gallery ==
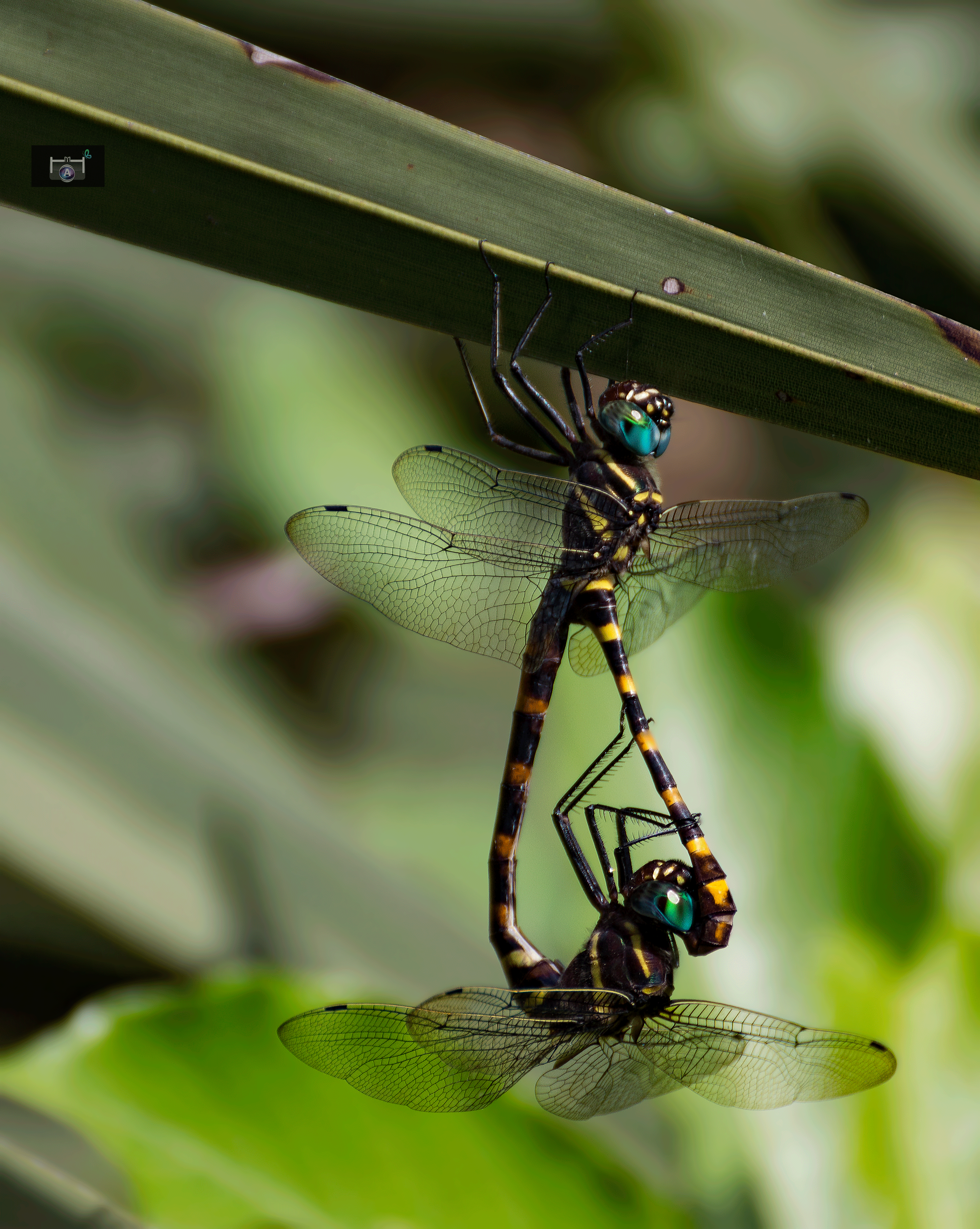
Mating pair

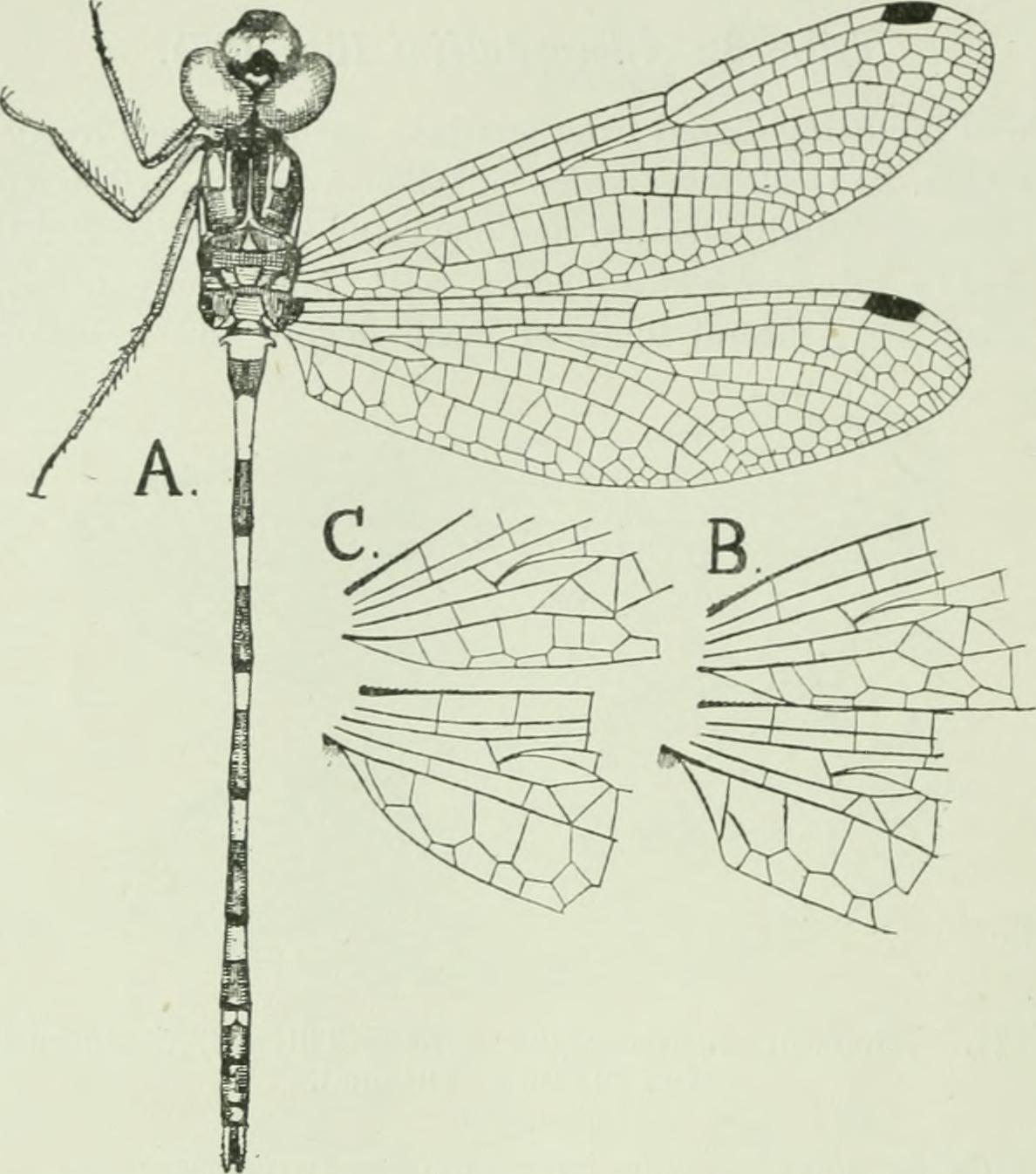
Drawing of a male Cordulephya pygmaea by R.J. Tillyard

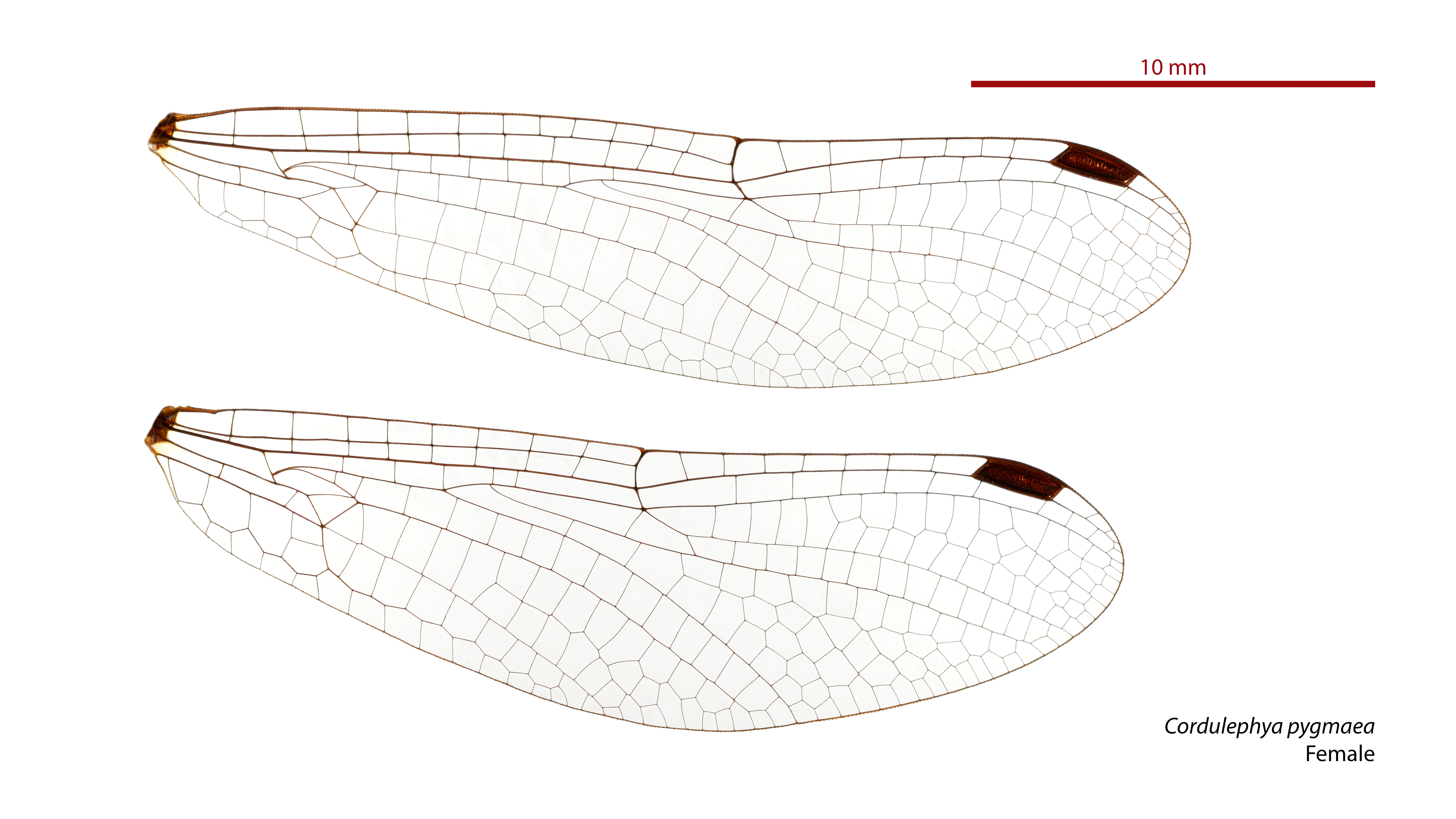
Female wings

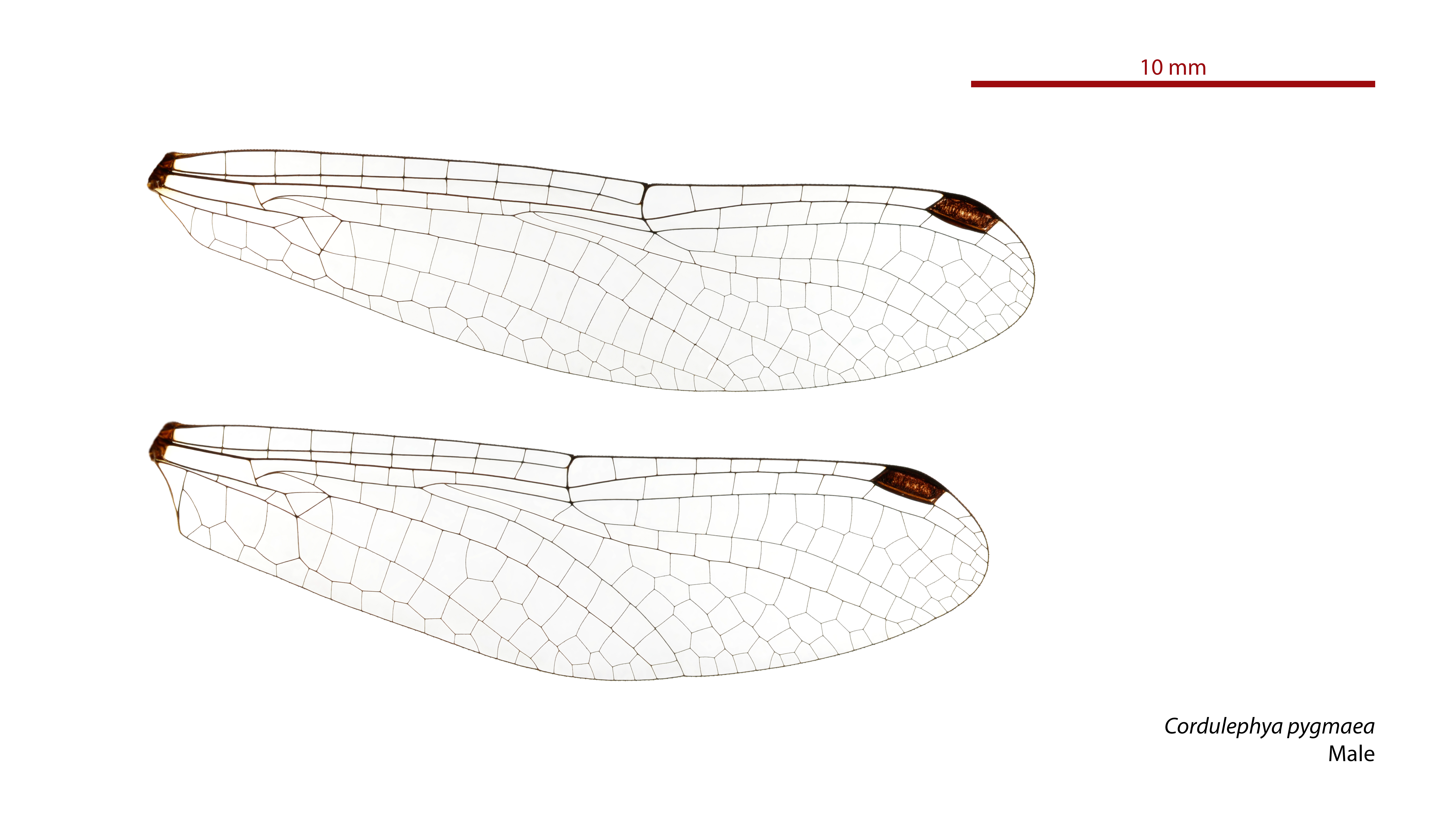
Male wings

== See also ==
- List of Odonata species of Australia
