= Cordulephya divergens =

Clubbed shutwing

Conservation status
- Vulnerable (IUCN 3.1)

Scientific classification
- Kingdom: Animalia
- Phylum: Arthropoda
- Clade: Pancrustacea
- Class: Insecta
- Order: Odonata
- Suborder: Anisoptera
- Superfamily: Libelluloidea
- Family: Austrocorduliidae
- Genus: Cordulephya
- Species: C. divergens

Binomial name
- Cordulephya divergens Tillyard, 1917
- Range in Sydney Basin, Australia

Species of dragonfly

Cordulephya divergens is a species of dragonfly in the family Austrocorduliidae. It is commonly known as the clubbed shutwing. It inhabits streams in the Sydney Basin, New South Wales, Australia.

It is a small to tiny dragonfly, black or purplish-black with yellowish markings, and rests with its wings folded above its body, similar to a damselfly.

== Etymology ==
The genus name Cordulephya combines Cordulia, a genus name derived from the Greek κορδύλη (kordylē, "club" or "cudgel"), with Greek φυή (phyē, "form", "stature" or "growth"), thus meaning "having the form of Cordulia".

The species name divergens is derived from the Latin divergo ("to diverge" or "spread apart"), referring to the divergent appendages.

== Gallery ==
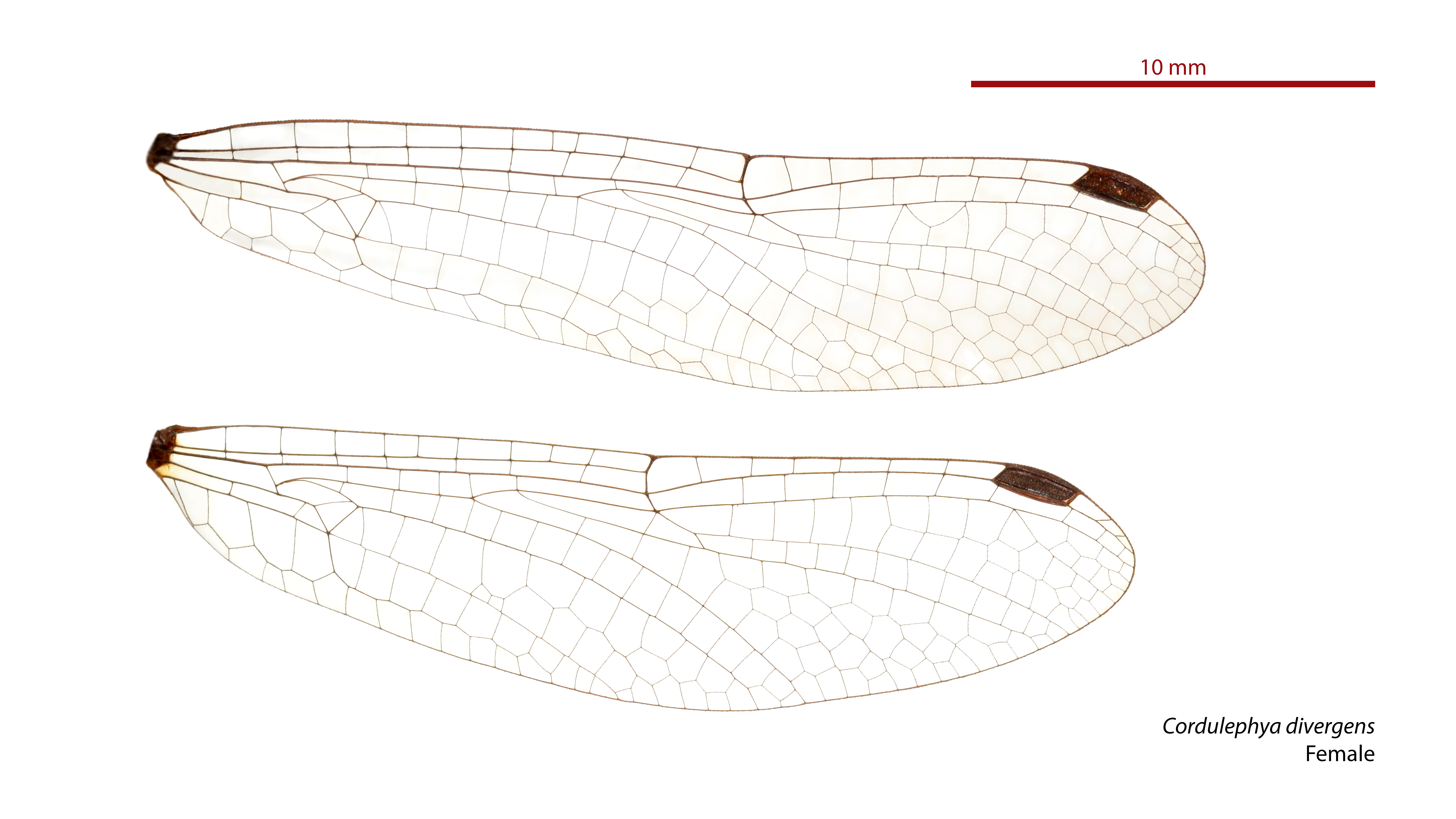
Female wings

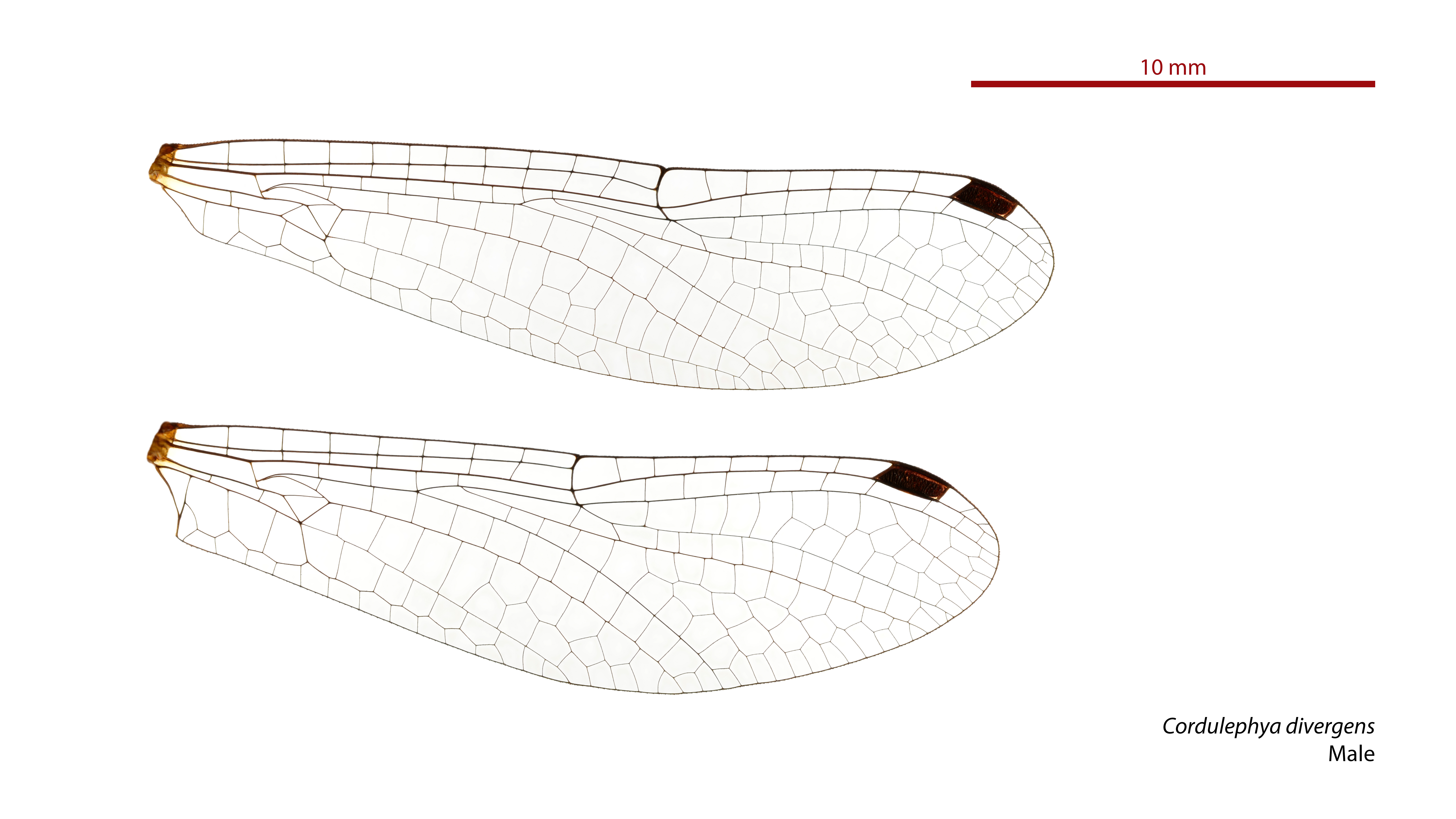
Male wings

== See also ==
- List of Odonata species of Australia
