= Cordulephyidae =

Scientific classification
- Kingdom: Animalia
- Phylum: Arthropoda
- Clade: Pancrustacea
- Class: Insecta
- Order: Odonata
- Infraorder: Anisoptera
- Superfamily: Libelluloidea
- Family: Cordulephyidae; Tillyard, 1917

Obsolete family of dragonflies

Cordulephyidae was formerly considered a distinct family of dragonflies occurring in Africa and Australia. Recent taxonomic revisions have classified the species previously placed in Cordulephyidae to now be in one of two families.

== Genera ==
The family, Cordulephyidae, had included the following two genera:

- Cordulephya Selys, 1870; this is now in the family Austrocorduliidae
- Neophya Selys, 1881; this is now in the family Neophyidae
