= Austrophya monteithorum =

Summit mystic

Conservation status
- Data Deficient (IUCN 3.1)

Scientific classification
- Kingdom: Animalia
- Phylum: Arthropoda
- Clade: Pancrustacea
- Class: Insecta
- Order: Odonata
- Suborder: Anisoptera
- Superfamily: Libelluloidea
- Family: Austrocorduliidae
- Genus: Austrophya
- Species: A. monteithorum

Binomial name
- Austrophya monteithorum Theischinger, 2019
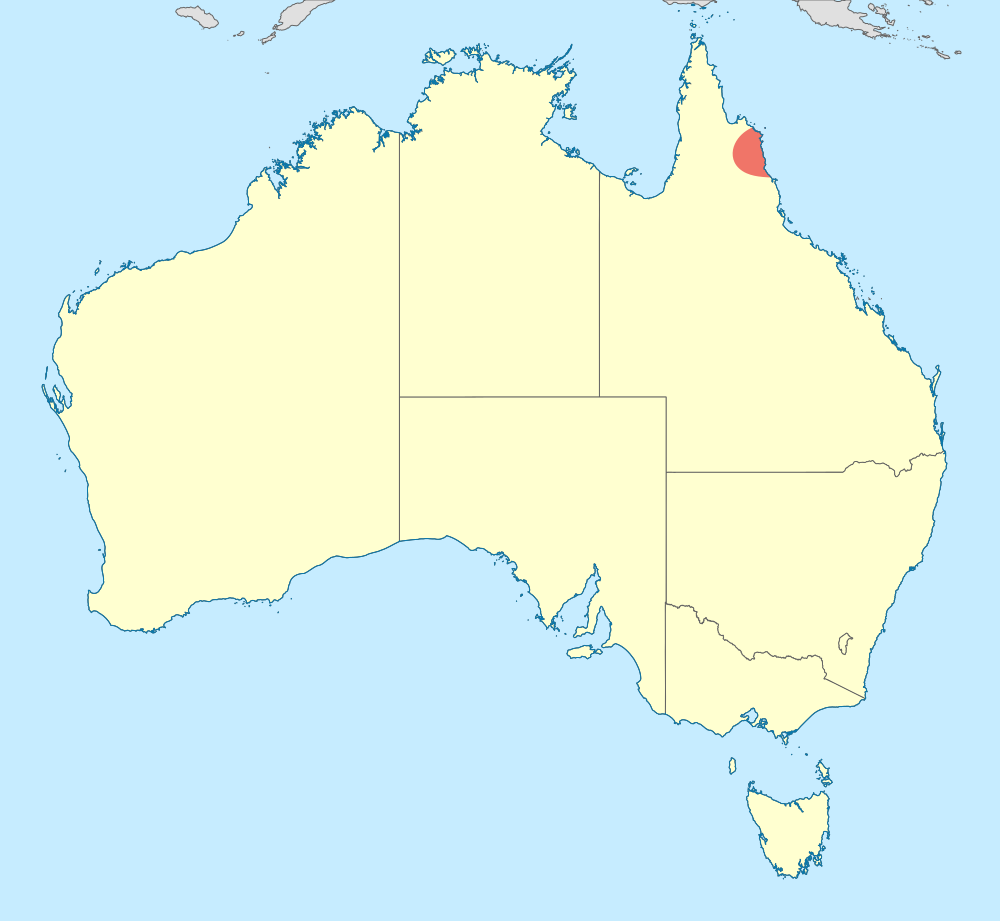
- Known distribution at Thornton Peak, Queensland

Species of dragonfly

Austrophya monteithorum is a species of dragonfly in the family Austrocorduliidae. It is commonly known as the summit mystic. It is listed as Data deficient by the IUCN. The species is endemic to the summit plateau of Thornton Peak in tropical Queensland, Australia.

== Description and ecology ==
Austrophya monteithorum is known only from larval specimens collected at the summit plateau of Thornton Peak.

== Etymology ==
The genus name Austrophya combines the prefix austro- (from Latin auster, meaning “south wind”, hence “southern”) with -phya, from Greek φυή (phyē, “growth” or “stature”).

The species name monteithorum is an eponym honouring Geoff and Sybil Monteith of the Queensland Museum, who collected the type material during an expedition to Thornton Peak in 1984.

== See also ==
- List of Odonata species of Australia
