= Cordulephya montana =

Mountain shutwing

Conservation status
- Near Threatened (IUCN 3.1)

Scientific classification
- Kingdom: Animalia
- Phylum: Arthropoda
- Clade: Pancrustacea
- Class: Insecta
- Order: Odonata
- Suborder: Anisoptera
- Superfamily: Libelluloidea
- Family: Austrocorduliidae
- Genus: Cordulephya
- Species: C. montana

Binomial name
- Cordulephya montana Tillyard, 1911
- Range in south-eastern Australia

Species of dragonfly

Cordulephya montana is a species of dragonfly in the family Austrocorduliidae. It is commonly known as the mountain shutwing. It inhabits streams in eastern New South Wales, Australia.

It is a small to tiny dragonfly, black or purplish-black with yellowish markings, and rests with its wings folded above its body, similar to a damselfly.

== Etymology ==
The genus name Cordulephya combines Cordulia, a genus name derived from the Greek κορδύλη (kordylē, "club" or "cudgel"), with Greek φυή (phyē, "form", "stature" or "growth"), thus meaning "having the form of Cordulia".

The species name montana is derived from the Latin montanus ("of the mountains" or "mountainous"), referring to the Blue Mountains of New South Wales, where the original specimens were collected.

== Gallery ==
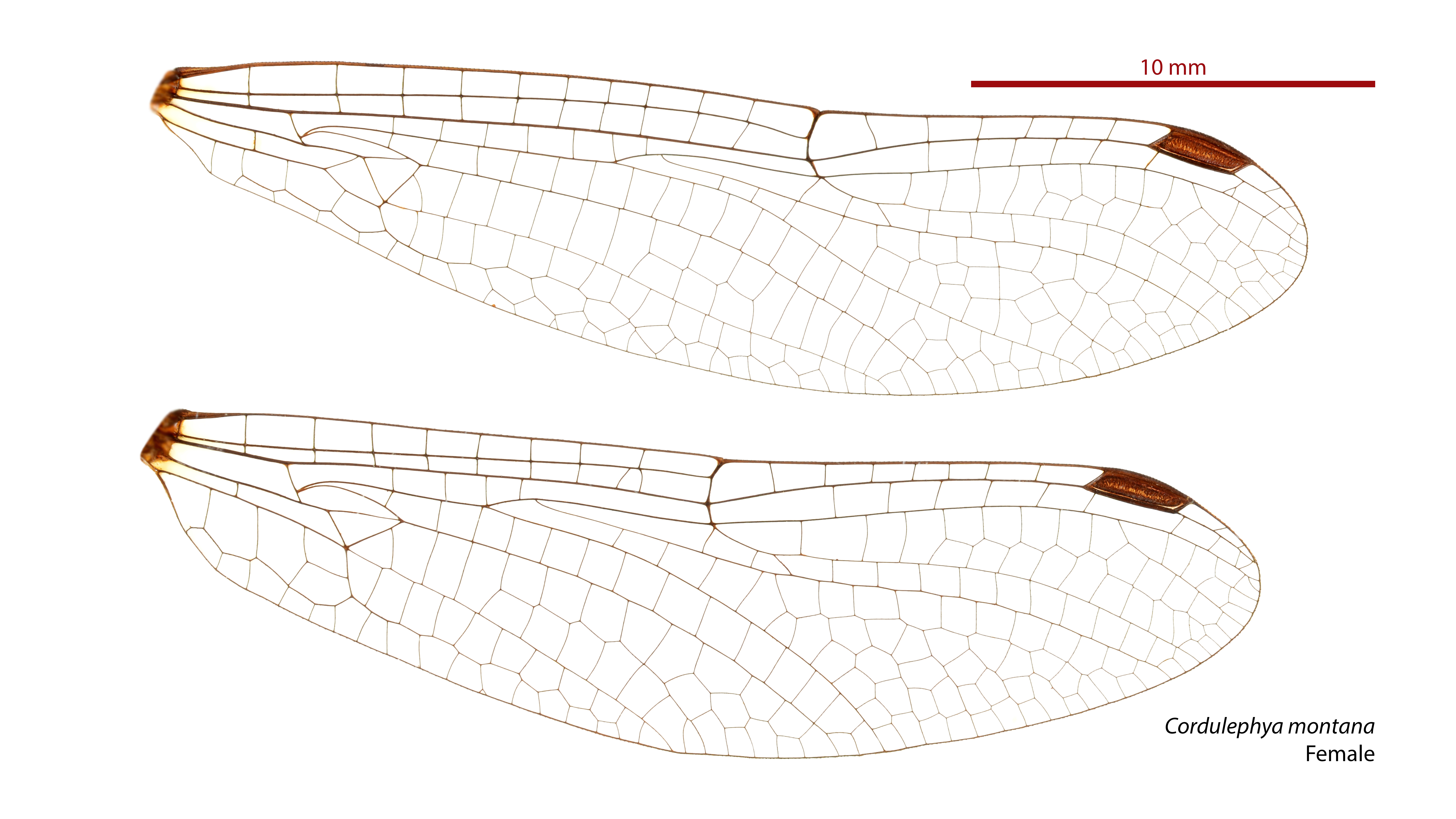
Female wings

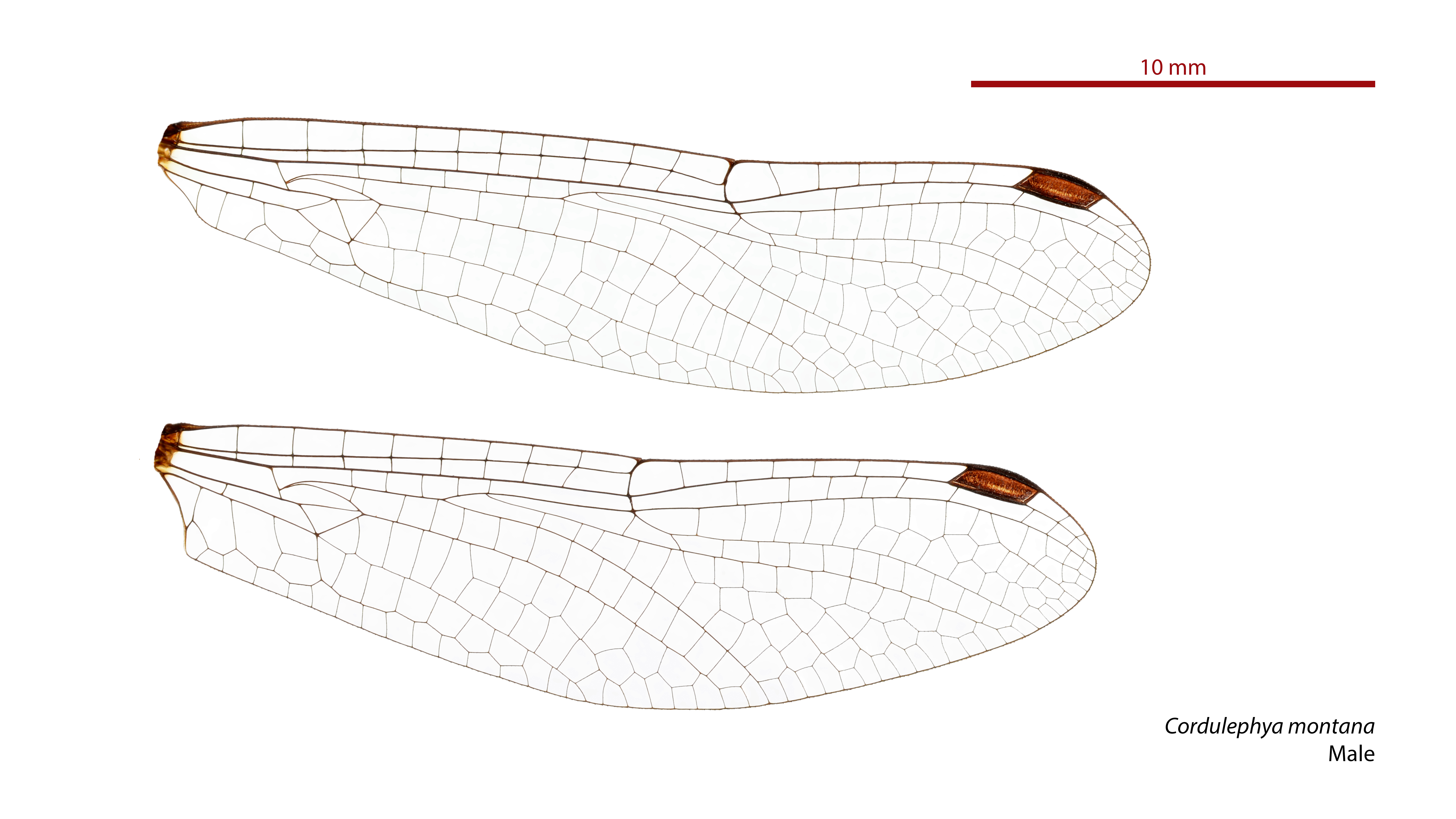
Male wings

== See also ==
- List of Odonata species of Australia
