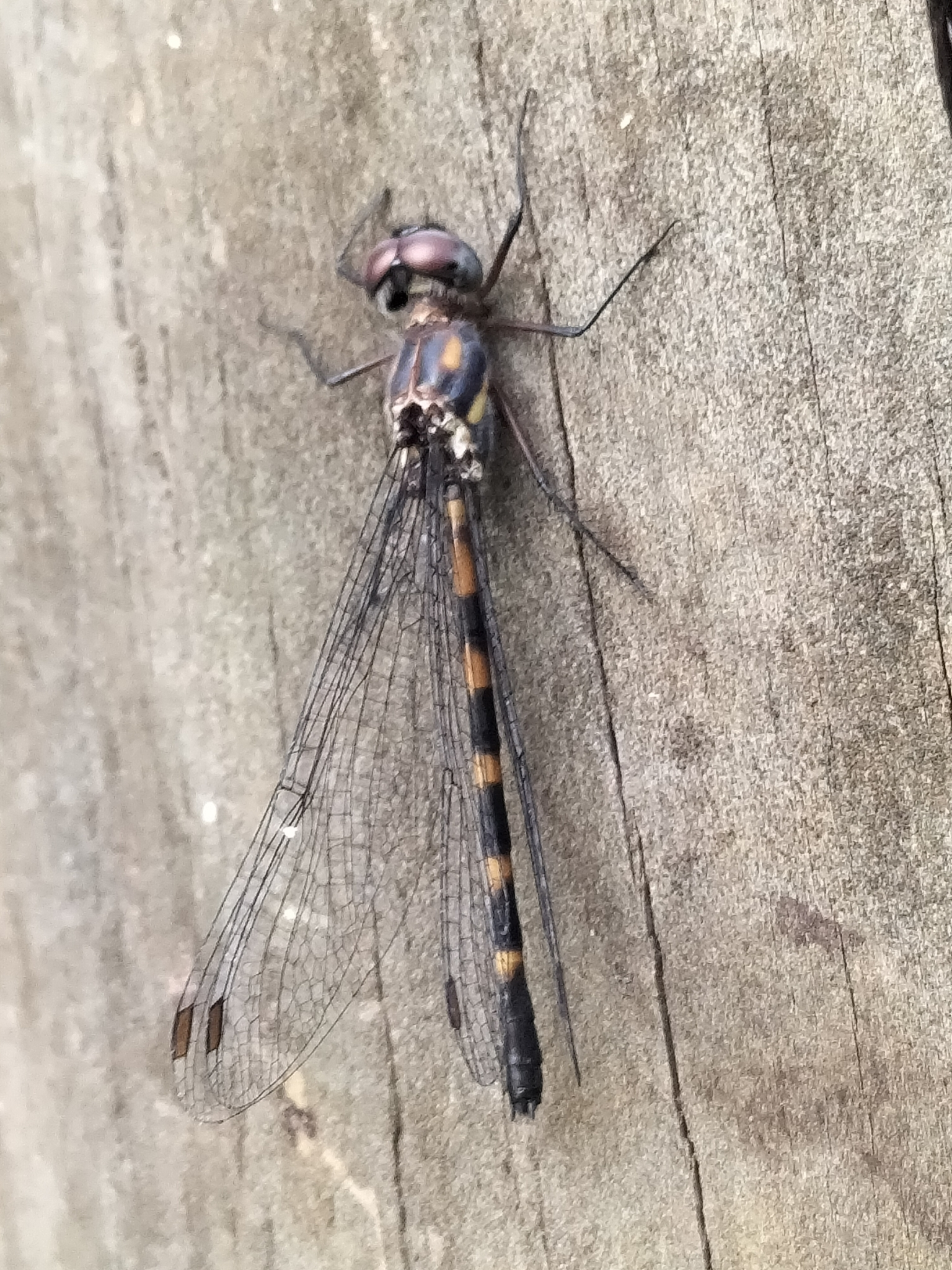
- Female

Conservation status
- Vulnerable (IUCN 3.1)

Scientific classification
- Kingdom: Animalia
- Phylum: Arthropoda
- Clade: Pancrustacea
- Class: Insecta
- Order: Odonata
- Suborder: Anisoptera
- Superfamily: Libelluloidea
- Family: Austrocorduliidae
- Genus: Cordulephya
- Species: C. bidens

Binomial name
- Cordulephya bidens Sjöstedt, 1917
- Range in tropical North Queensland, Australia

= Cordulephya bidens =

Tropical shutwing

Species of dragonfly

Cordulephya bidens is a species of dragonfly in the family Austrocorduliidae, commonly known as the tropical shutwing. It inhabits rainforest streams in northern Queensland, Australia.

Cordulephya bidens is a small to tiny, black or purplish-black dragonfly with yellowish markings. It rests with its wings folded above its body, similar to a damselfly.

== Etymology ==
The genus name Cordulephya combines Cordulia, a genus name derived from the Greek κορδύλη (kordylē, "club" or "cudgel"), with Greek φυή (phyē, "form", "stature" or "growth"), thus meaning "having the form of Cordulia".

The species name bidens is Latin for "two-toothed" or "with two teeth", likely referring to the teeth on the male appendages.

== Gallery ==
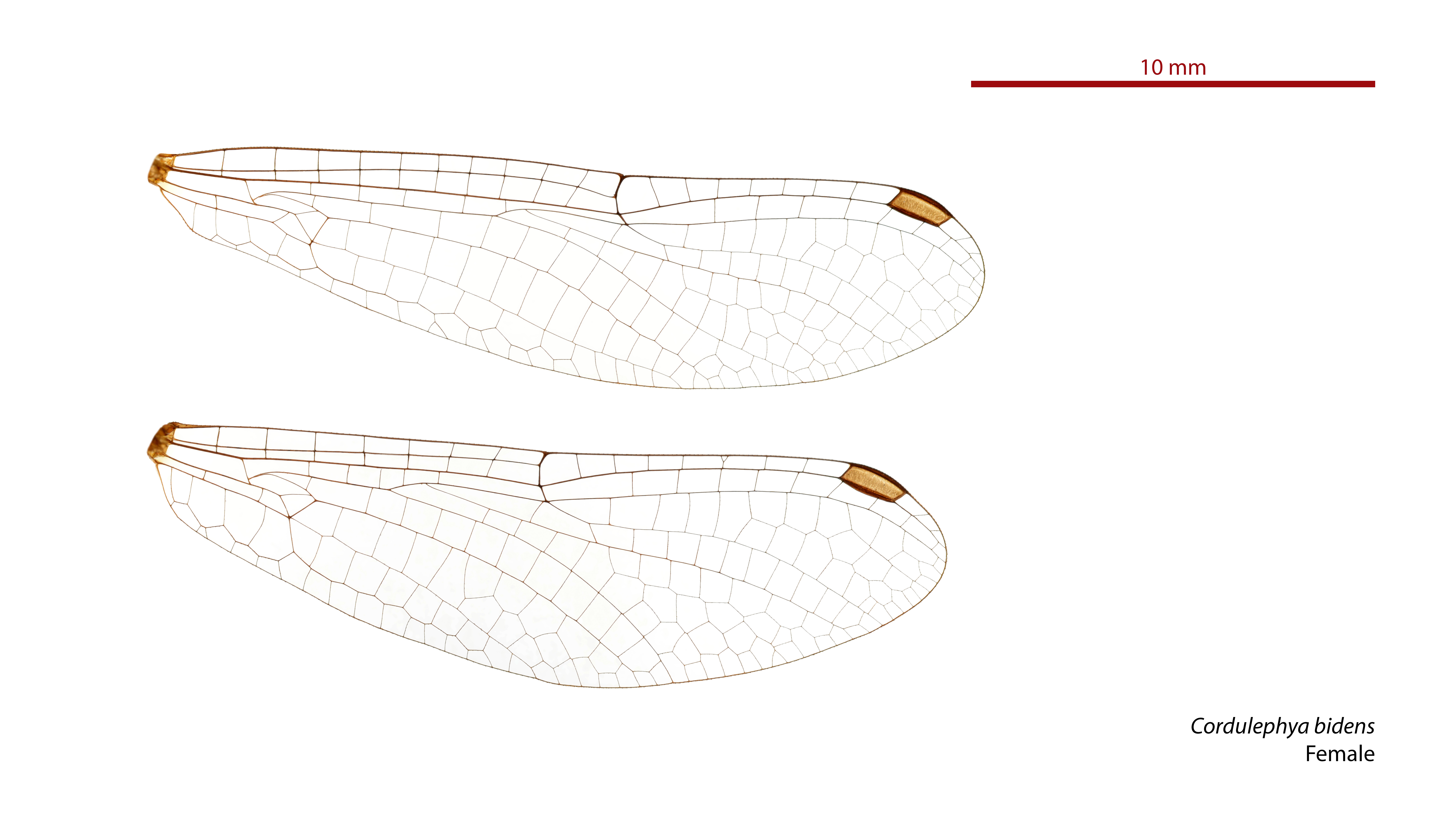
Female wings

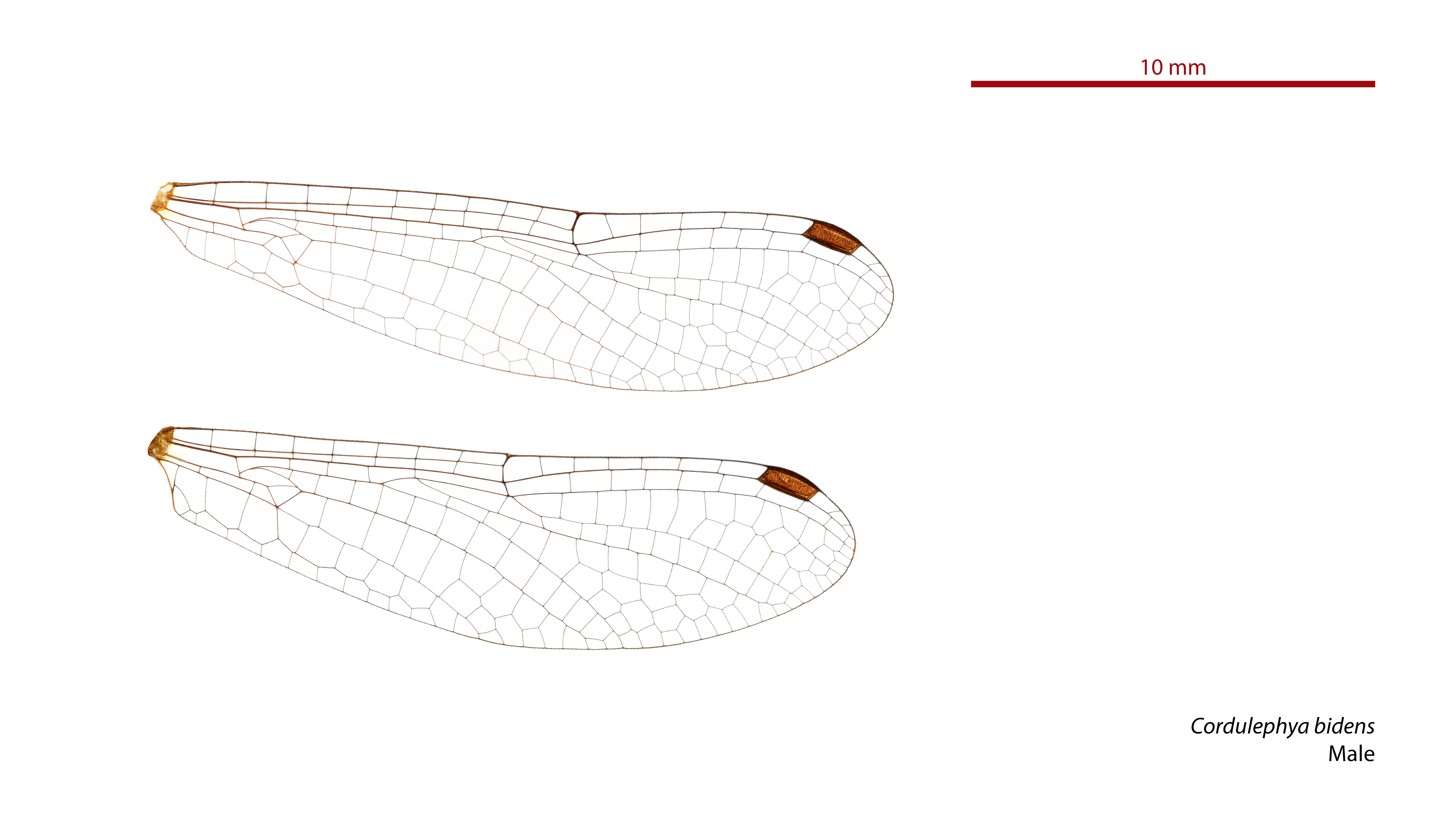
Male wings

== See also ==
- List of Odonata species of Australia
