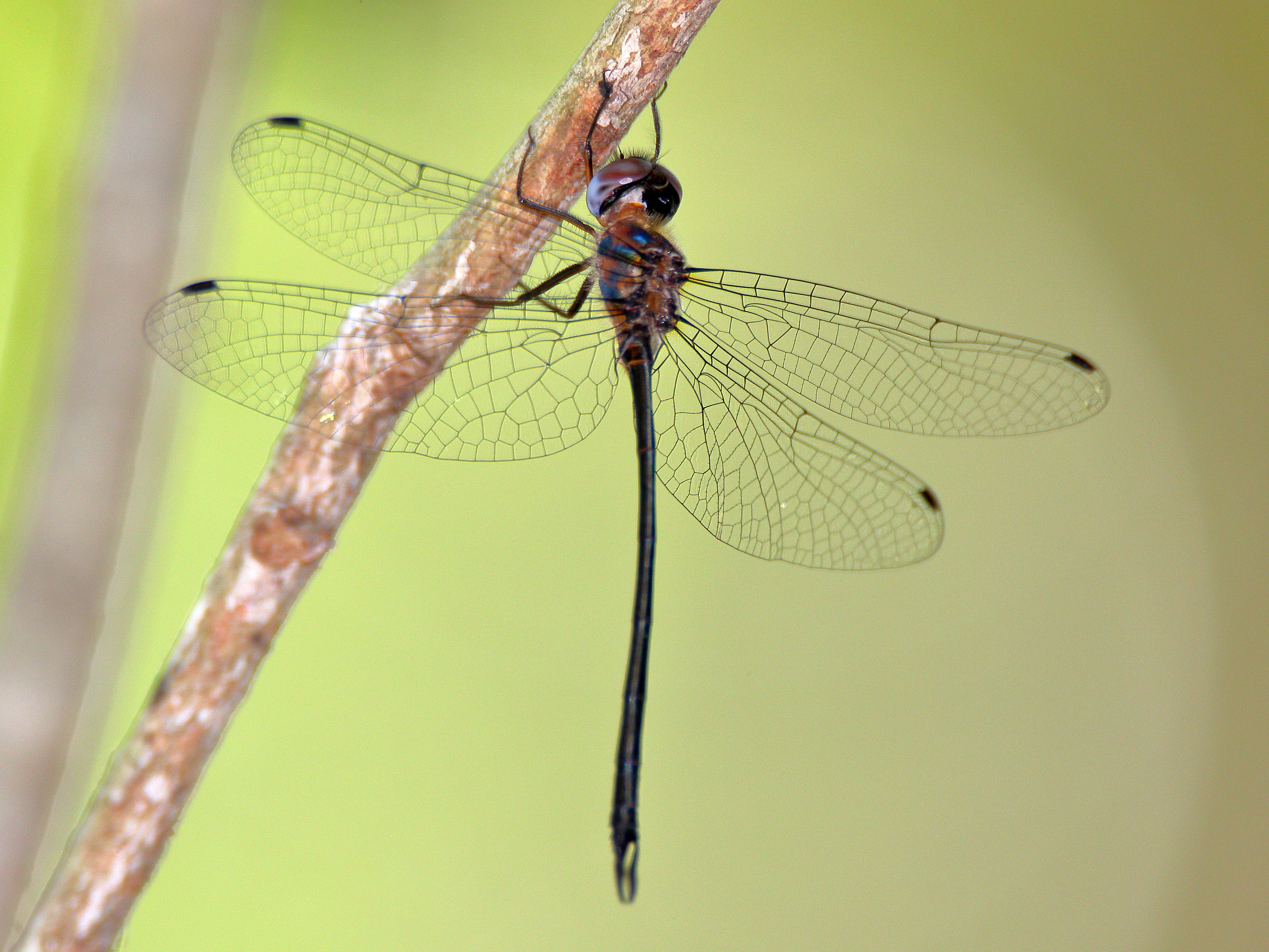
- Male, north Queensland

Conservation status
- Near Threatened (IUCN 3.1)

Scientific classification
- Kingdom: Animalia
- Phylum: Arthropoda
- Clade: Pancrustacea
- Class: Insecta
- Order: Odonata
- Suborder: Anisoptera
- Superfamily: Libelluloidea
- Family: Austrocorduliidae
- Genus: Austrophya
- Species: A. mystica

Binomial name
- Austrophya mystica Tillyard, 1909
- Distribution in north-eastern Australia

= Austrophya mystica =

Rainforest mystic

Species of dragonfly

Austrophya mystica is a species of dragonfly in the family Austrocorduliidae. It is commonly known as the rainforest mystic. It is listed as Near Threatened by the IUCN. The species is endemic to north-eastern Australia, where it inhabits rainforest streams. It is a small and slender, bronze-black dragonfly.

== Etymology ==
The genus name Austrophya combines the prefix austro- (from Latin auster, meaning “south wind”, hence “southern”) with -phya, from Greek φυή (phyē, “growth” or “stature”).

The species name mystica is derived from the Latin mysticus ("secret" or "obscure"), possibly referring to the lack of clear markings on the only known specimen, a female in poor condition.

== Gallery ==
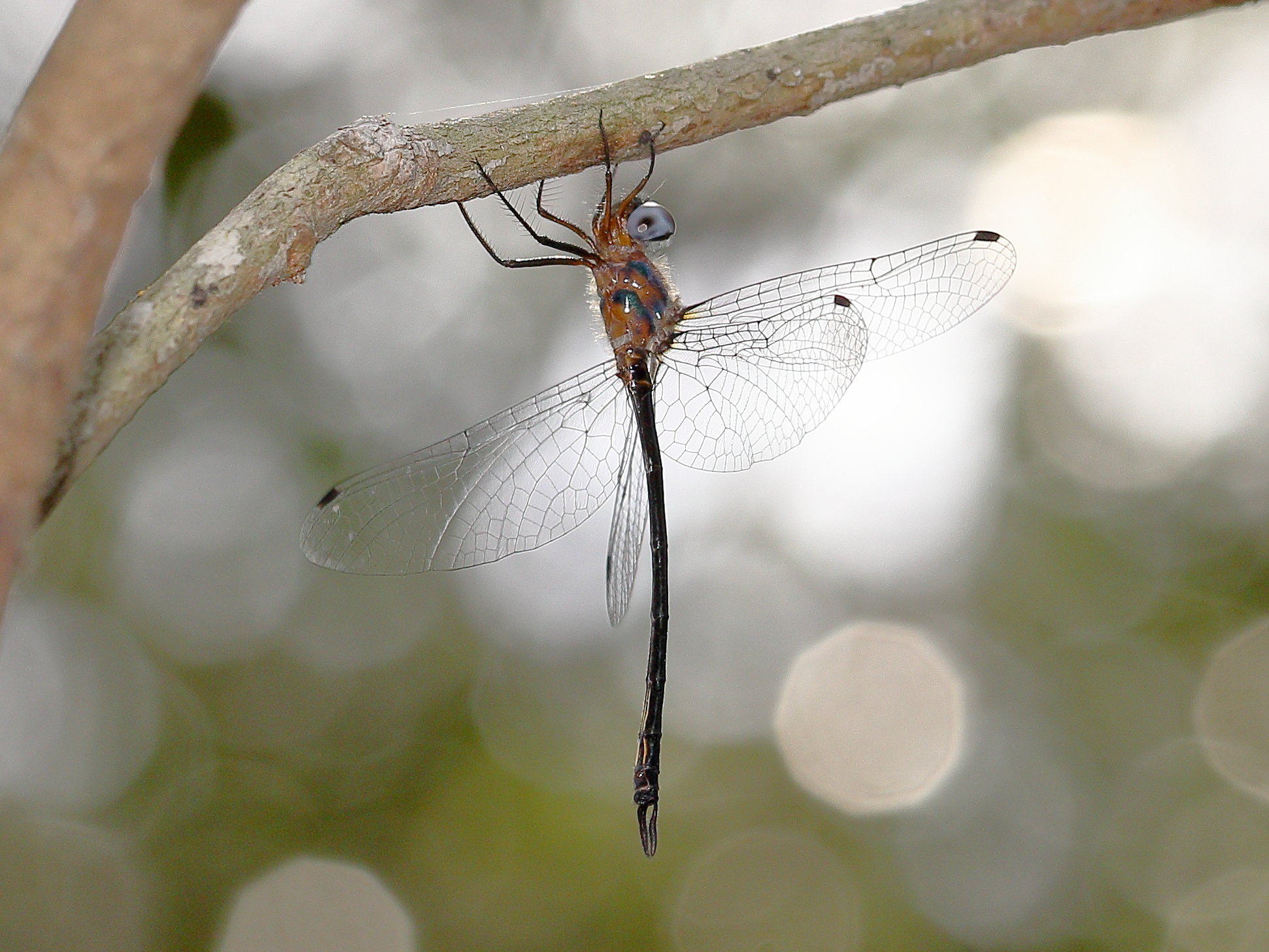
Male underside, Queensland

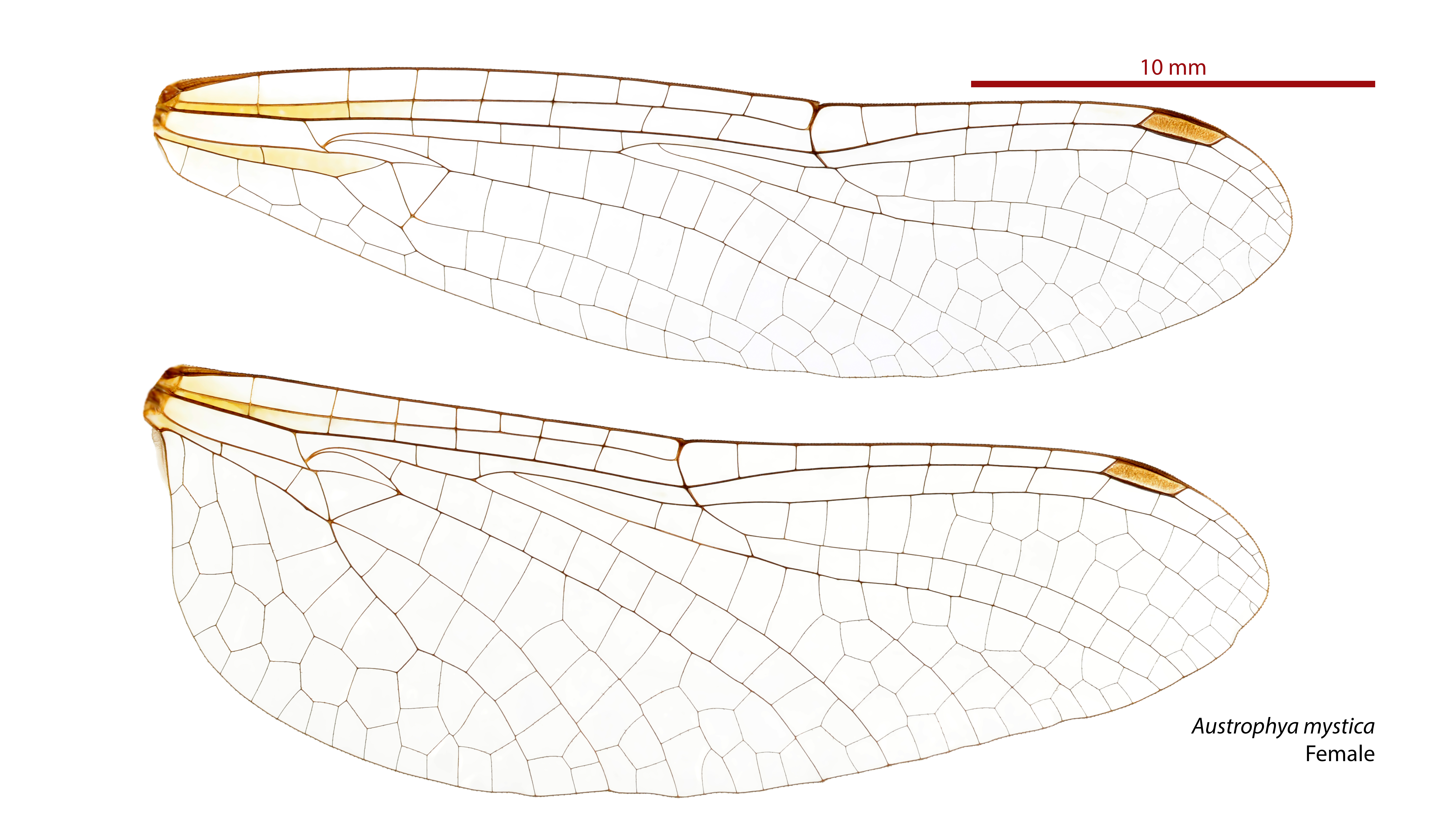
Female wings

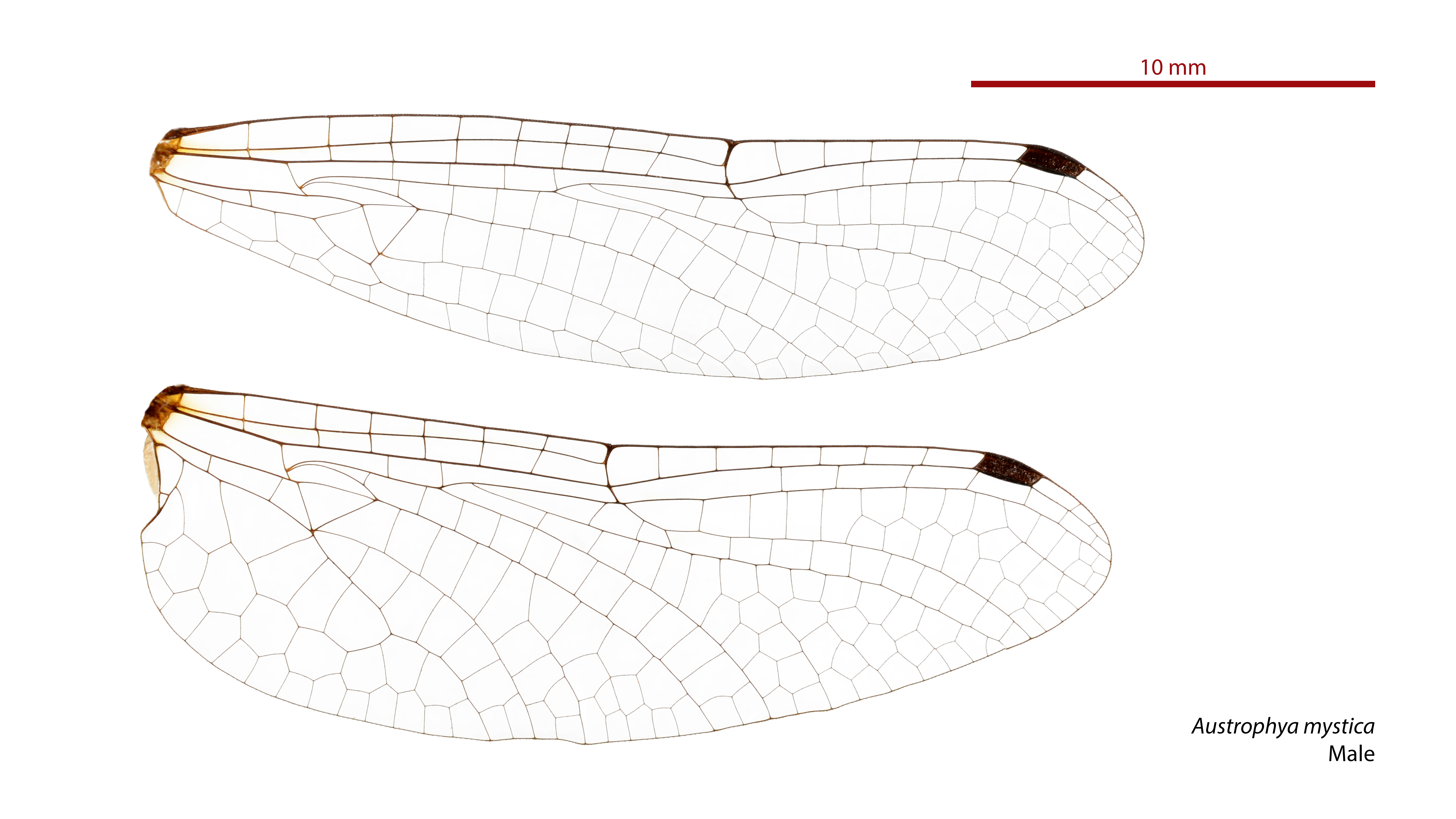
Male wings

== See also ==
- List of Odonata species of Australia
