= Eleuthemis buettikoferi =

Conservation status
- Least Concern (IUCN 3.1)

Scientific classification
- Kingdom: Animalia
- Phylum: Arthropoda
- Clade: Pancrustacea
- Class: Insecta
- Order: Odonata
- Infraorder: Anisoptera
- Superfamily: Libelluloidea
- Family: Libellulidae
- Genus: Eleuthemis
- Species: E. buettikoferi

Binomial name
- Eleuthemis buettikoferi Ris, 1910

Species of dragonfly

Eleuthemis buettikoferi, the sunlight firebelly, is a species of dragonfly in the family Libellulidae.

It is found in Angola, Cameroon, Central African Republic, the Democratic Republic of the Congo, Ivory Coast, Equatorial Guinea, Gabon, Ghana, Guinea, Liberia, Mozambique, Nigeria, Sierra Leone, Tanzania, Togo, Uganda, Zambia, and Zimbabwe. Its natural habitats are subtropical or tropical moist lowland forests, subtropical or tropical dry shrubland, subtropical or tropical moist shrubland, and rivers.
