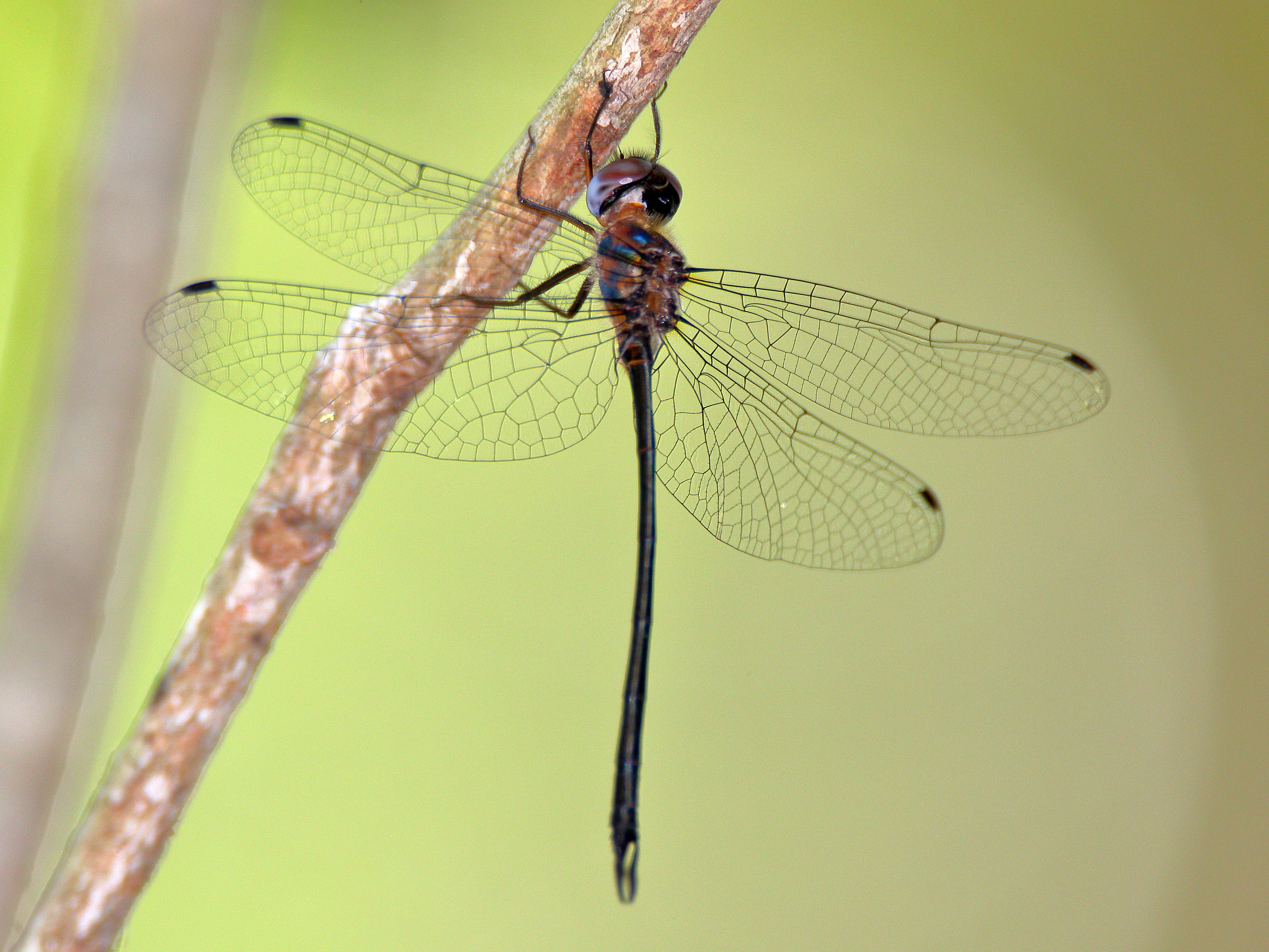
- Austrophya mystica male, north Queensland

Scientific classification
- Kingdom: Animalia
- Phylum: Arthropoda
- Clade: Pancrustacea
- Class: Insecta
- Order: Odonata
- Suborder: Anisoptera
- Superfamily: Libelluloidea
- Family: Austrocorduliidae
- Genus: Austrophya; Tillyard, 1909
- Distribution in north-eastern Australia

= Austrophya =

Genus of dragonflies

Austrophya is a genus of dragonflies in the family Austrocorduliidae. It is endemic to north-eastern Australia.

== Species ==
This genus includes the following species:

- Austrophya mystica Tillyard, 1909 – rainforest mystic
- Austrophya monteithorum Theischinger, 2019 – summit mystic

== Etymology ==
The genus name Austrophya combines the prefix austro- (from Latin auster, meaning “south wind”, hence “southern”) with -phya, from Greek φυή (phyē, “growth” or “stature”). The name refers to a southern representative of that group.

== Taxonomy ==
Austrophya was monotypic from its description in 1909 until Austrophya monteithorum was described in 2019.

In 2013 the genus was considered incertae sedis within Libelluloidea. Subsequently, molecular and morphological studies have placed it in the family Austrocorduliidae.
