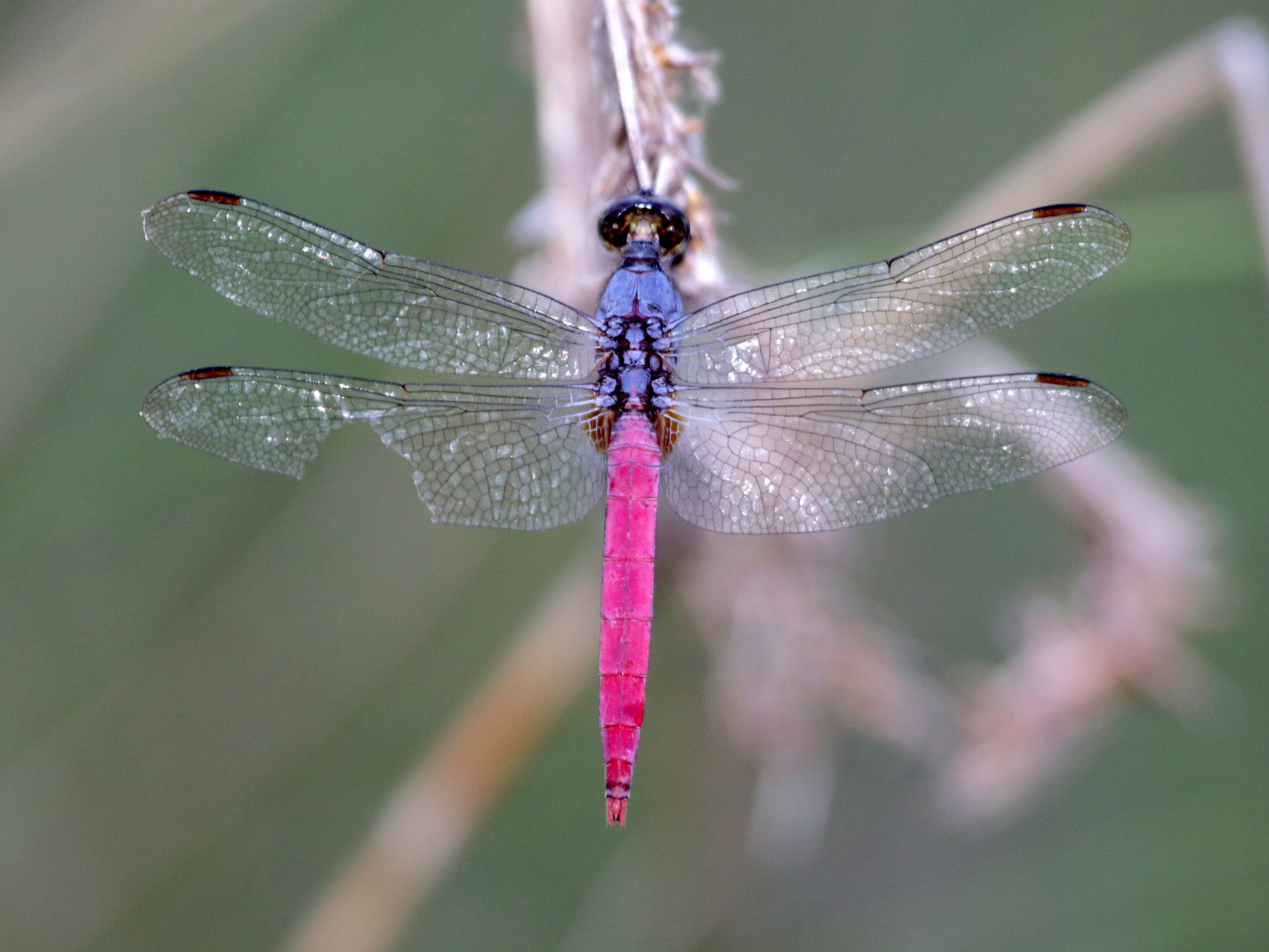
- Orthetrum migratum at Mataranka, Australia

Conservation status
- Least Concern (IUCN 3.1)

Scientific classification
- Kingdom: Animalia
- Phylum: Arthropoda
- Clade: Pancrustacea
- Class: Insecta
- Order: Odonata
- Suborder: Anisoptera
- Superfamily: Libelluloidea
- Family: Libellulidae
- Genus: Orthetrum
- Species: O. migratum

Binomial name
- Orthetrum migratum Lieftinck, 1951

Synonyms
- Orthetrum pruinosum migratum Lieftinck, 1951

= Orthetrum migratum =

Rosy skimmer

Species of dragonfly

Orthetrum migratum is an Australian freshwater dragonfly species in the family Libellulidae. The common name for this species is rosy skimmer. It inhabits streams, boggy seepages, riverine pools and swamps across northern Australia.

Orthetrum migratum is a medium-sized dragonfly with a body that can be yellow-green or grey-brown to dark blue. The abdomen of a male is red and evenly tapered, while the abdomen of a female is coloured a yellow-green-brown.

== Etymology ==
The genus name Orthetrum is derived from the Greek ὀρθός (orthos, "straight") and ἦτρον (ētron, "abdomen"), referring to the parallel-sided abdomen of the genus.

The species name migratum is derived from the Latin migro ("to migrate" or "to move"), referring to immigration into Cape York Peninsula in Queensland.

== Gallery ==
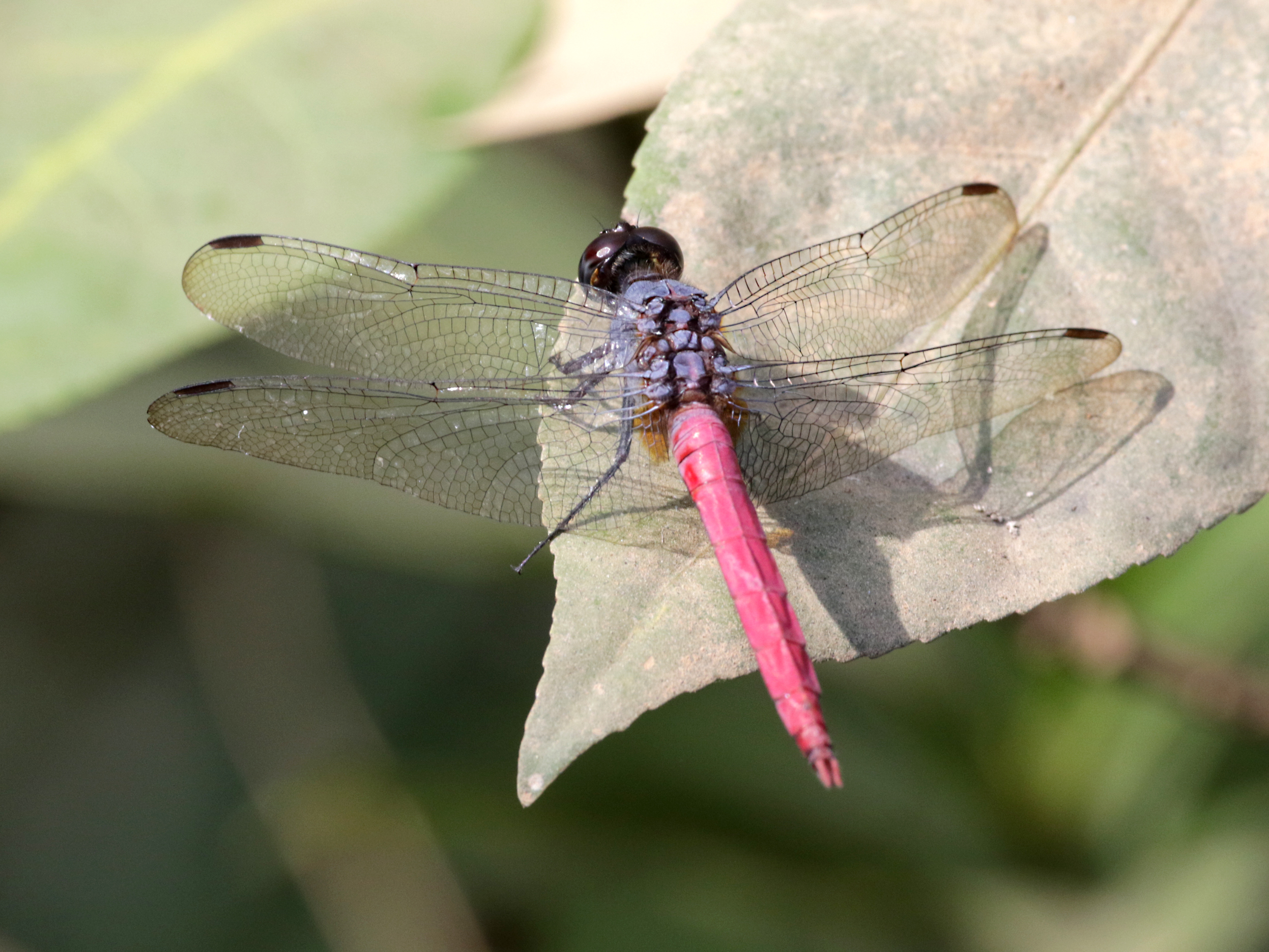
Hind quarter view

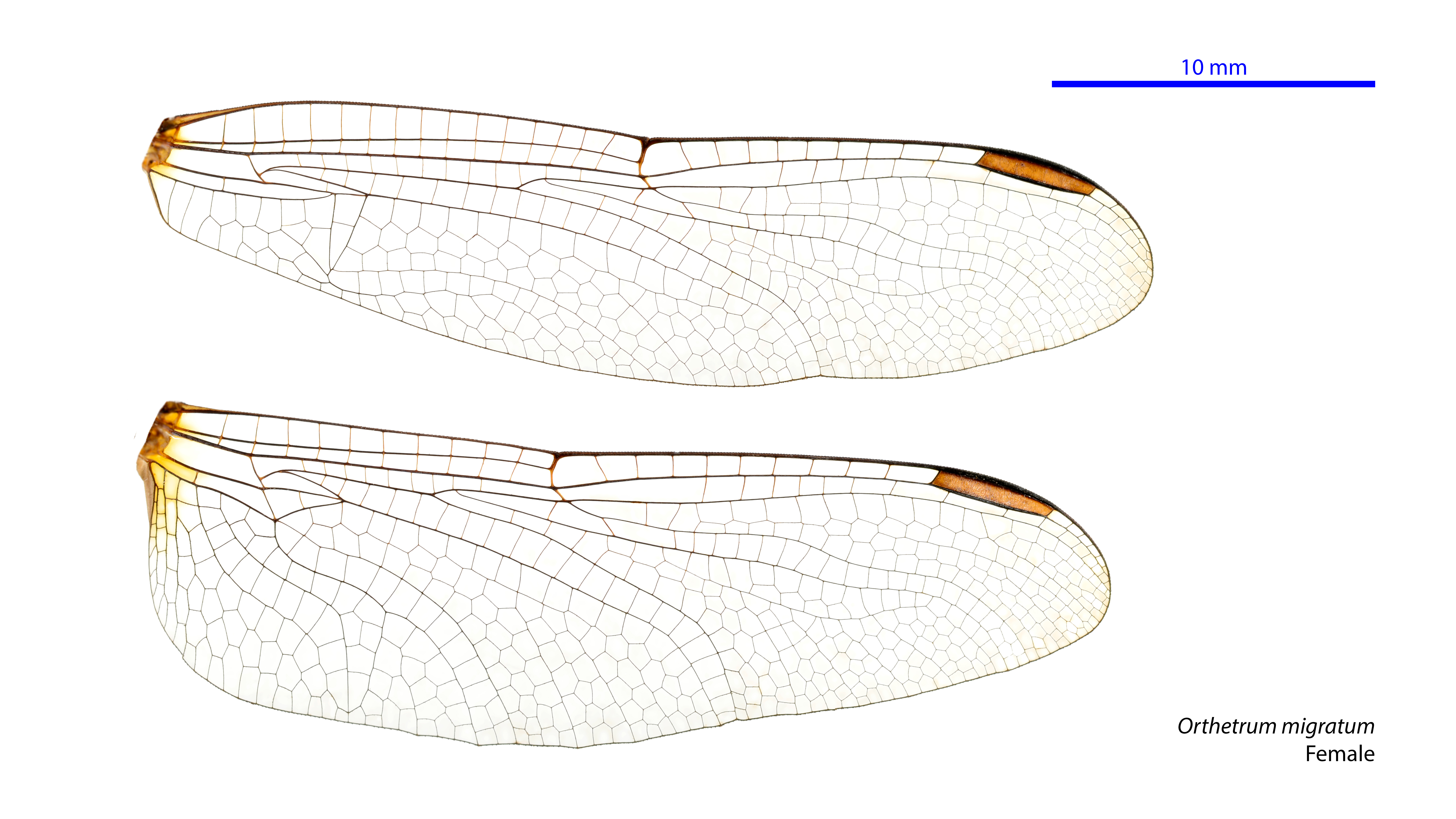
Female wings

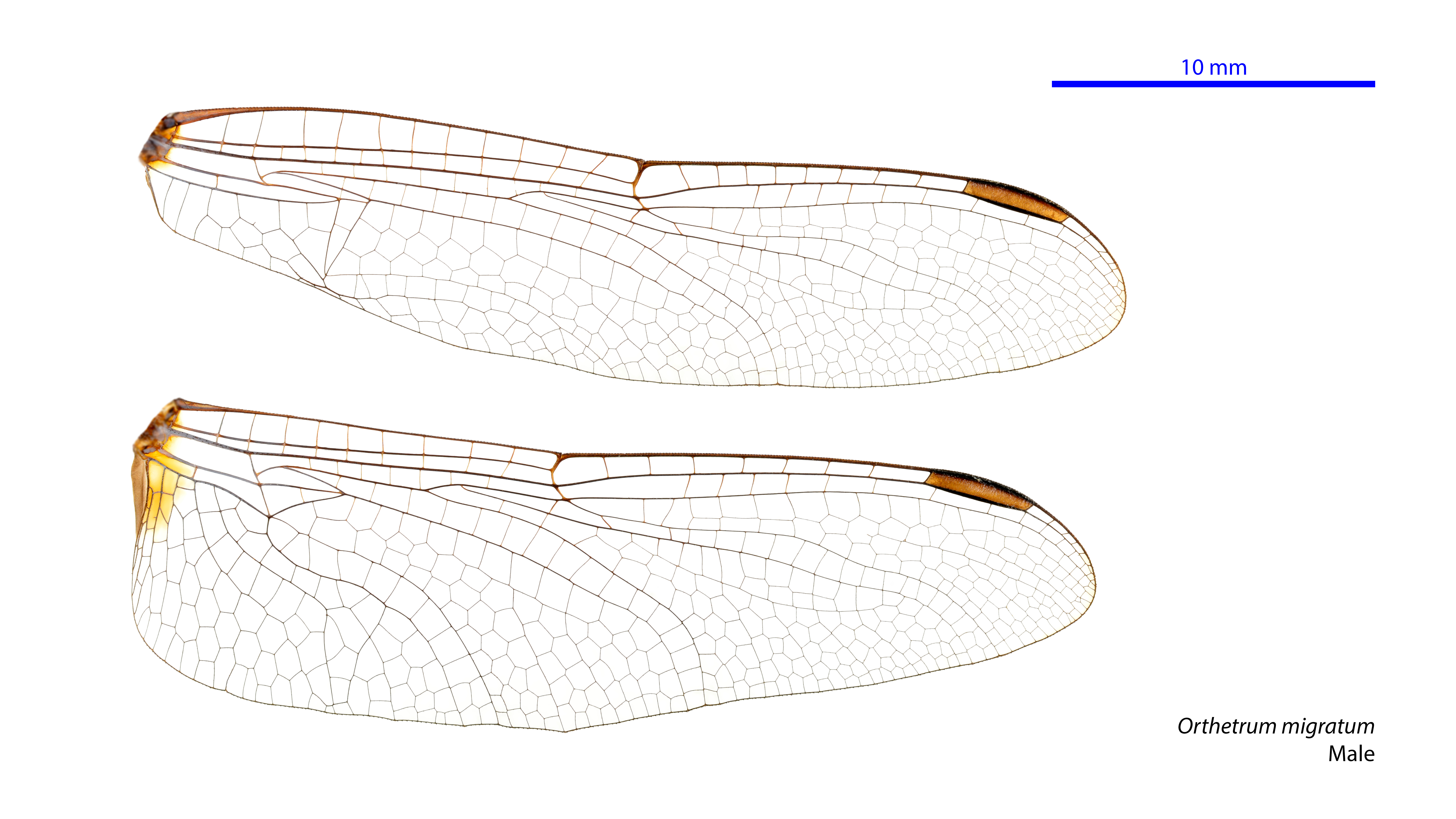
Male wings

== See also ==
- List of Odonata species of Australia
