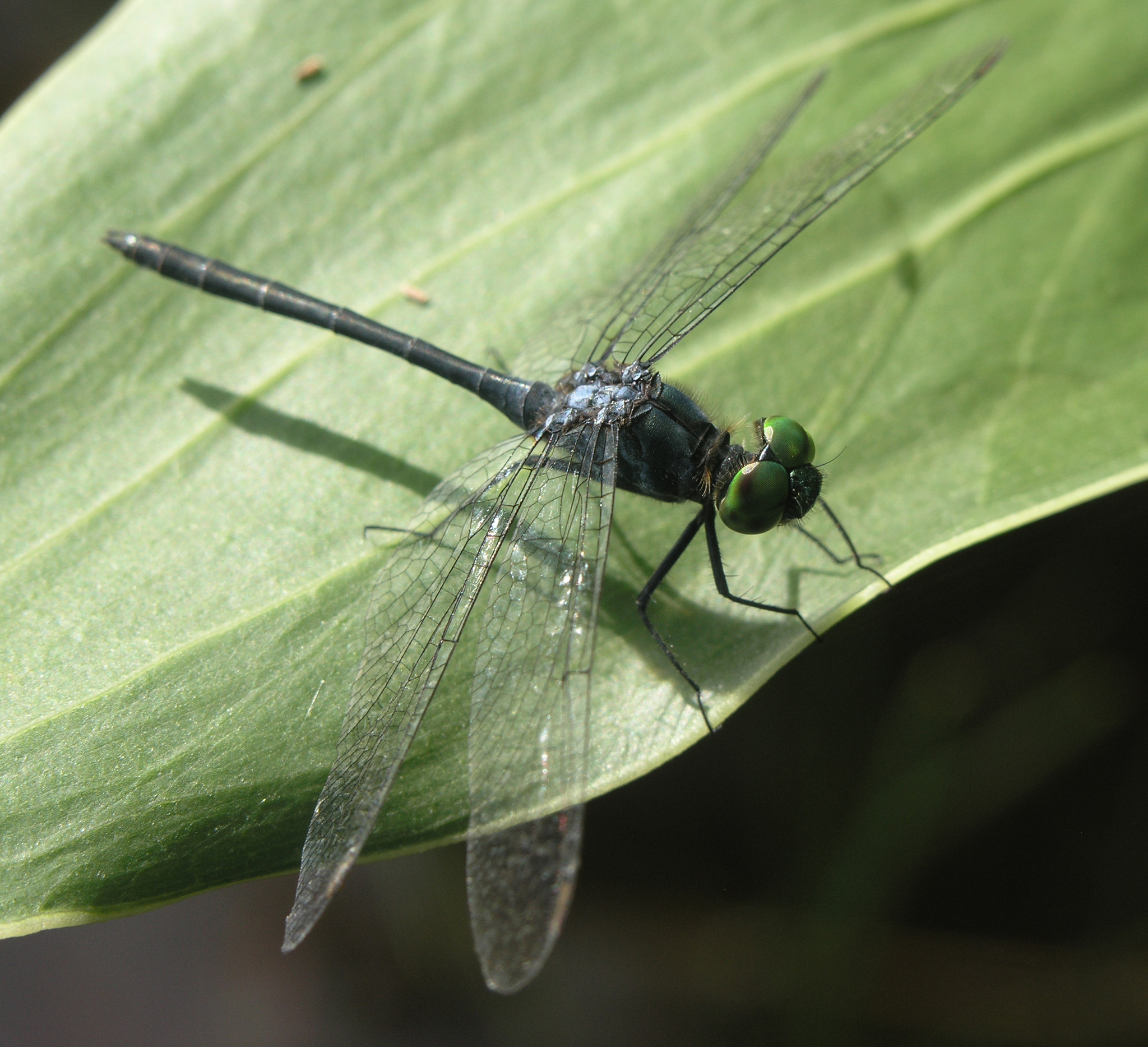
- Green-eyed Percher (Chalybeothemis fluviatilis)

Scientific classification
- Kingdom: Animalia
- Phylum: Arthropoda
- Clade: Pancrustacea
- Class: Insecta
- Order: Odonata
- Infraorder: Anisoptera
- Superfamily: Libelluloidea
- Family: Libellulidae
- Subfamily: Brachydiplacinae
- Genus: Chalybeothemis; Lieftinck, 1933

Species
- 3, see text

= Chalybeothemis =

Genus of dragonflies

Chalybeothemis is a genus of dragonflies in the family Libellulidae. It contains three species native to Southeast Asia.

== Distribution ==
This genus is found in Southeast Asia including Indonesia, Malaysia, and Thailand

== Habitat ==
This genus prefers habitat with clear, low pH waters.

== Species ==
- Chalybeothemis chini
- Chalybeothemis fluviatilis
- Chalybeothemis pruinosa
