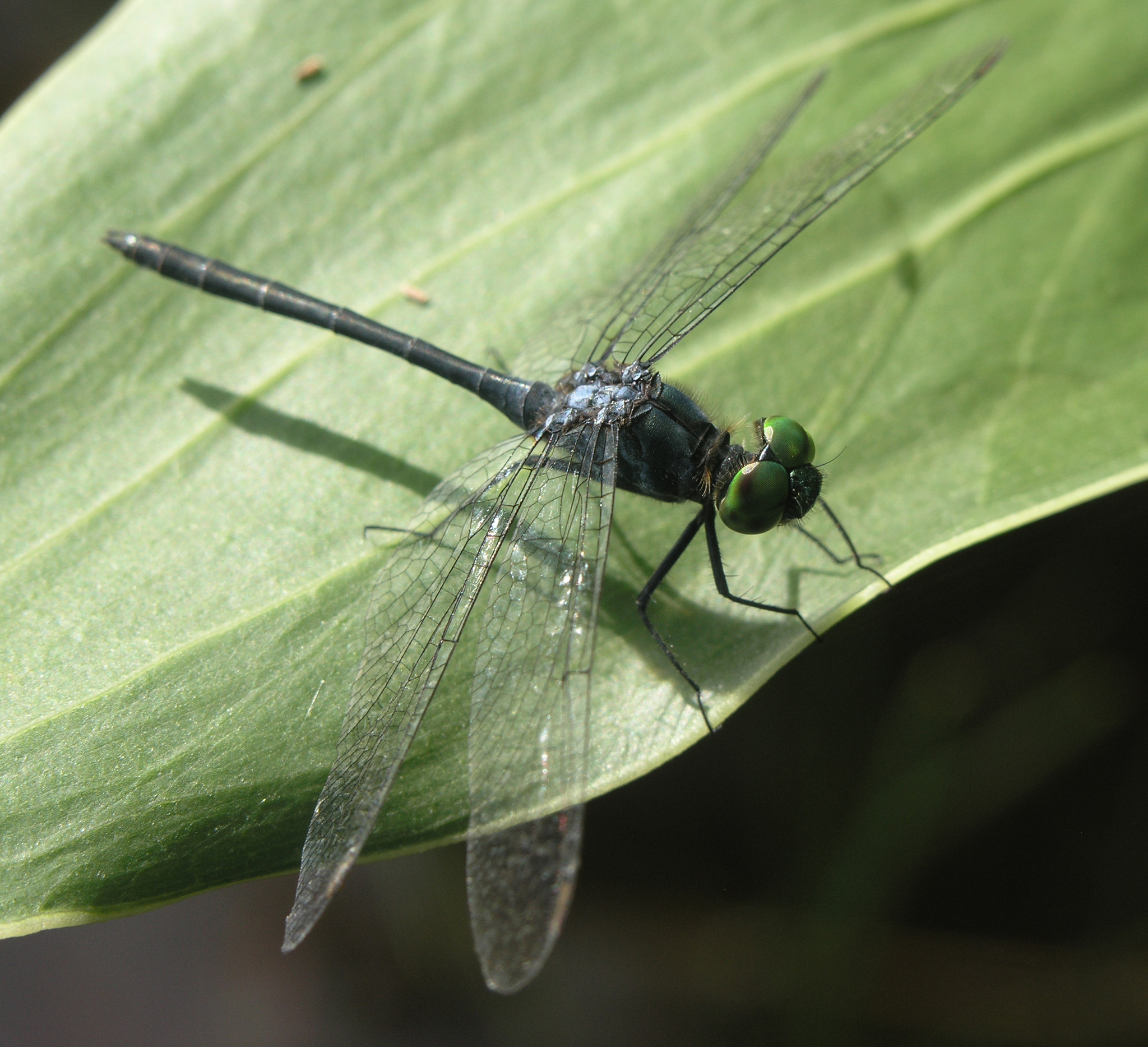

Scientific classification
- Kingdom: Animalia
- Phylum: Arthropoda
- Clade: Pancrustacea
- Class: Insecta
- Order: Odonata
- Infraorder: Anisoptera
- Superfamily: Libelluloidea
- Family: Libellulidae
- Genus: Chalybeothemis
- Species: C. pruinosa

Binomial name
- Chalybeothemis pruinosa Dow, Choong & Orr, 2007

= Chalybeothemis pruinosa =

Species of dragonfly

Chalybeothemis pruinosa is a species of dragonfly in the family Libellulidae.

== Distribution ==
This genus has been found on Malaysia.
