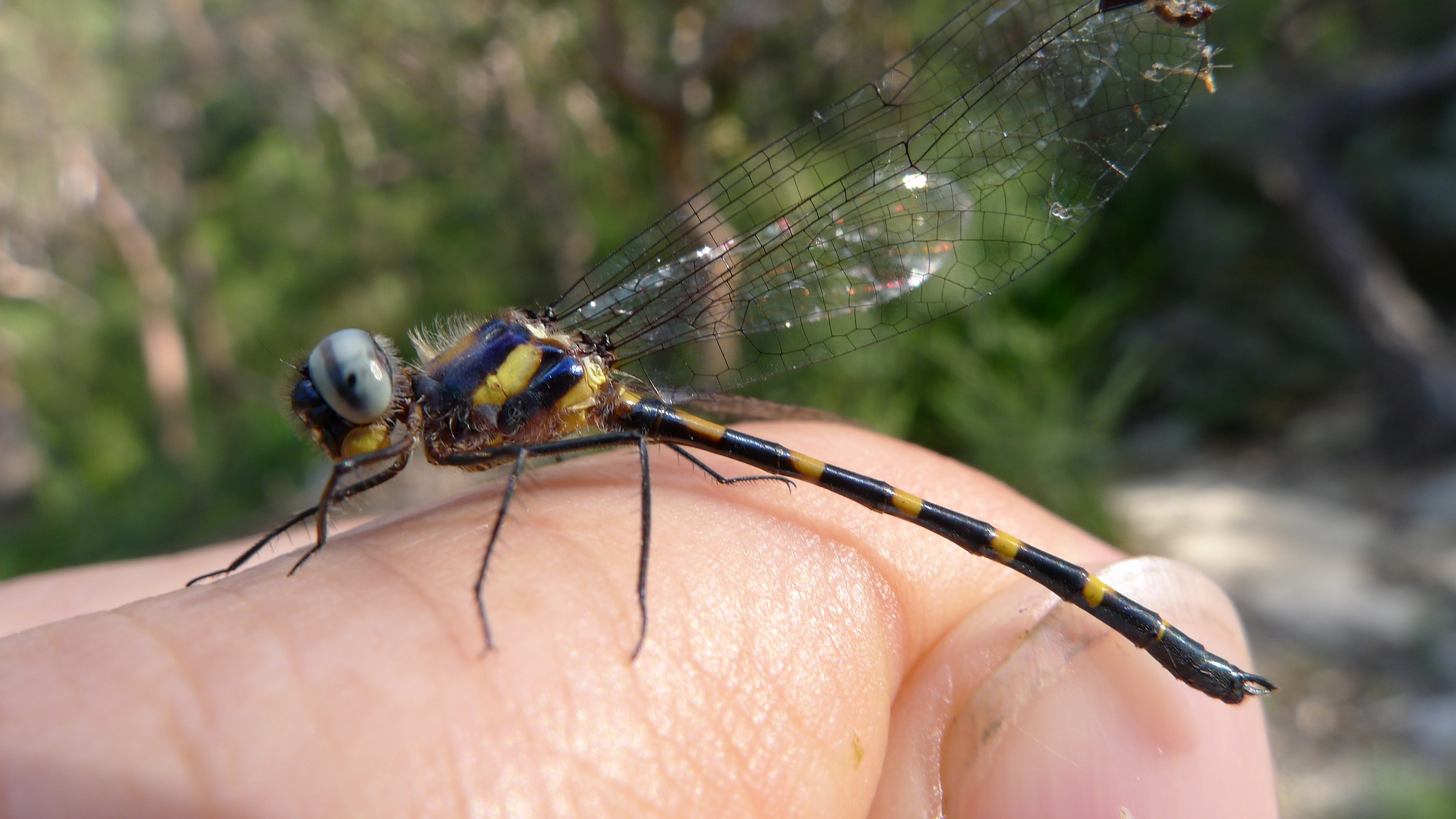
- Cordulephya pygmaea

Scientific classification
- Kingdom: Animalia
- Phylum: Arthropoda
- Clade: Pancrustacea
- Class: Insecta
- Order: Odonata
- Suborder: Anisoptera
- Superfamily: Libelluloidea
- Family: Austrocorduliidae
- Genus: Cordulephya; Selys, 1870
- Range of Cordulephya in eastern Australia

= Cordulephya =

Genus of dragonflies

Cordulephya is a genus of dragonflies in the family Austrocorduliidae, endemic to eastern Australia. Species are small to tiny, black or purplish-black with yellowish markings. Unusually for Anisoptera, they rest with their wings folded above the body, similar to some damselflies. They are commonly known as shutwings.

== Species ==
The genus includes four recognised species:

- Cordulephya bidens Sjöstedt, 1917 – tropical shutwing
- Cordulephya divergens Tillyard, 1917 – clubbed shutwing
- Cordulephya montana Tillyard, 1911 – mountain shutwing
- Cordulephya pygmaea Selys, 1870 – common shutwing

== Taxonomy ==
Cordulephya was originally grouped within the broad family concept that included the corduliines. It was subsequently placed in the family Corduliidae, a treatment widely used throughout much of the twentieth century. Some classifications have recognised a separate family, Cordulephyidae, for the shutwings. Later reviews were uncertain of its family relationships, and the genus was treated as incertae sedis within the superfamily Libelluloidea. Phylogenetic studies have since clarified its relationships, and Cordulephya is now placed in the family Austrocorduliidae.

== Etymology ==
The genus name Cordulephya combines Cordulia, a genus name derived from the Greek κορδύλη (kordylē, "club" or "cudgel"), with Greek φυή (phyē, "form", "stature" or "growth"), thus meaning "having the form of Cordulia".
