= Hesperocordulia =

Conservation status
- Near Threatened (IUCN 3.1)

Scientific classification
- Kingdom: Animalia
- Phylum: Arthropoda
- Clade: Pancrustacea
- Class: Insecta
- Order: Odonata
- Suborder: Anisoptera
- Superfamily: Libelluloidea
- Family: Austrocorduliidae
- Genus: Hesperocordulia; Tillyard, 1911
- Species: H. berthoudi

Binomial name
- Hesperocordulia berthoudi Tillyard, 1911
- Distribution in south-western Australia

Genus of dragonflies

Hesperocordulia is a genus of dragonflies in the family Austrocorduliidae, endemic to south-western Australia. It is monotypic, containing a single species, Hesperocordulia berthoudi.

Hesperocordulia berthoudi, known as the orange streamcruiser, is a medium-sized orange, red and black dragonfly with clear wings and very long legs. It inhabits streams, rivers and pools, and its conservation status is assessed as Near Threatened.

== Taxonomy ==
Hesperocordulia was described by Robin Tillyard in 1911 as part of the corduliid group. It has subsequently been assigned to several different families in historical classifications. Phylogenetic studies have since clarified its relationships, and it is now placed in the family Austrocorduliidae.

== Etymology ==
The genus name Hesperocordulia combines the Greek ἑσπέρα (hespera, "evening" or "west") with Cordulia, a genus name derived from the Greek κορδύλη (kordylē, "club" or "cudgel"). The name possibly refers to the occurrence of the species in south-western Western Australia.

In 1911, Robin Tillyard named this species berthoudi, an eponym honouring his friend George Berthoud (1856-1936) of State Farm, Hamel, Western Australia, who collected the original specimen.

== Gallery ==
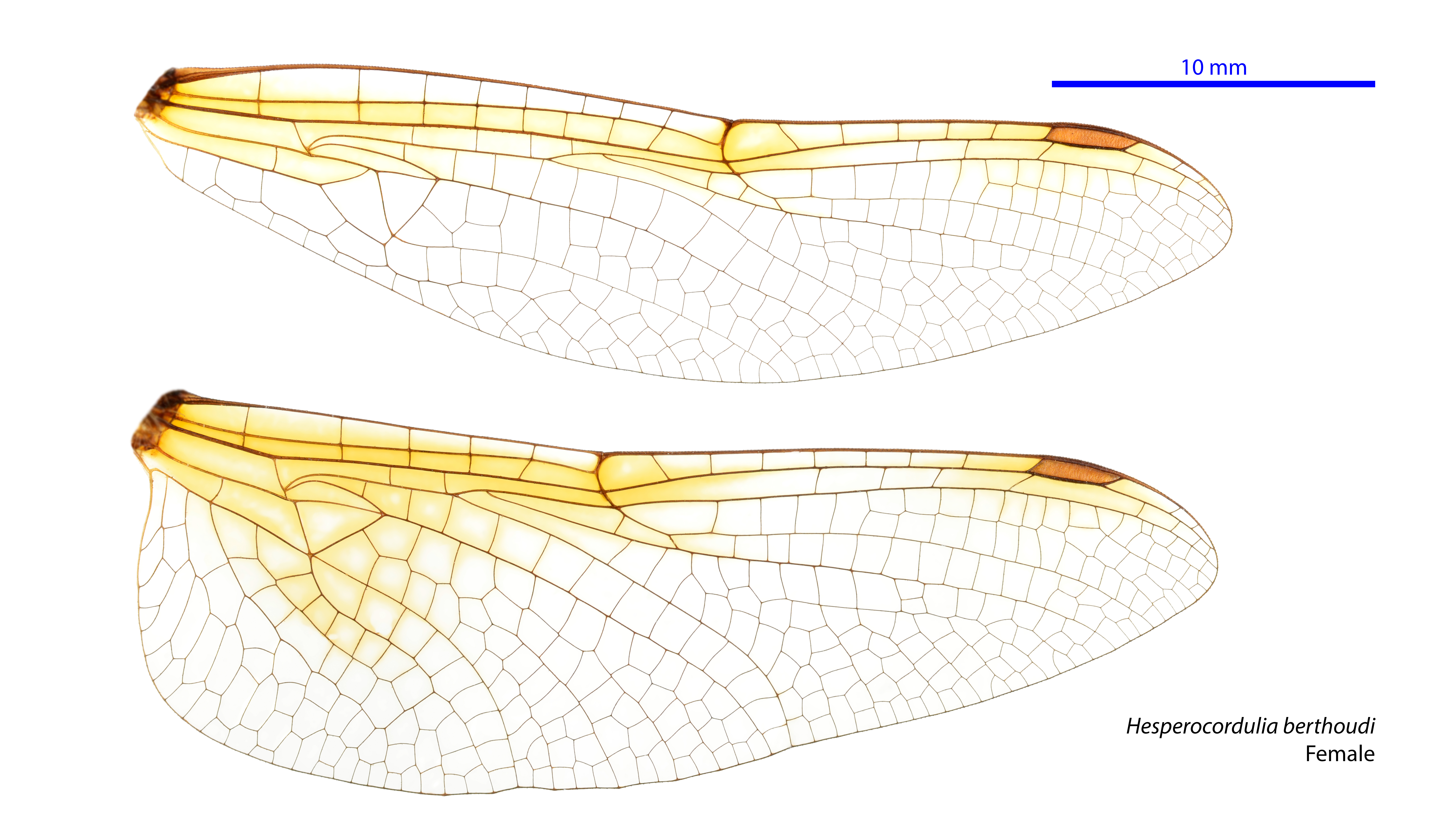
Female wings

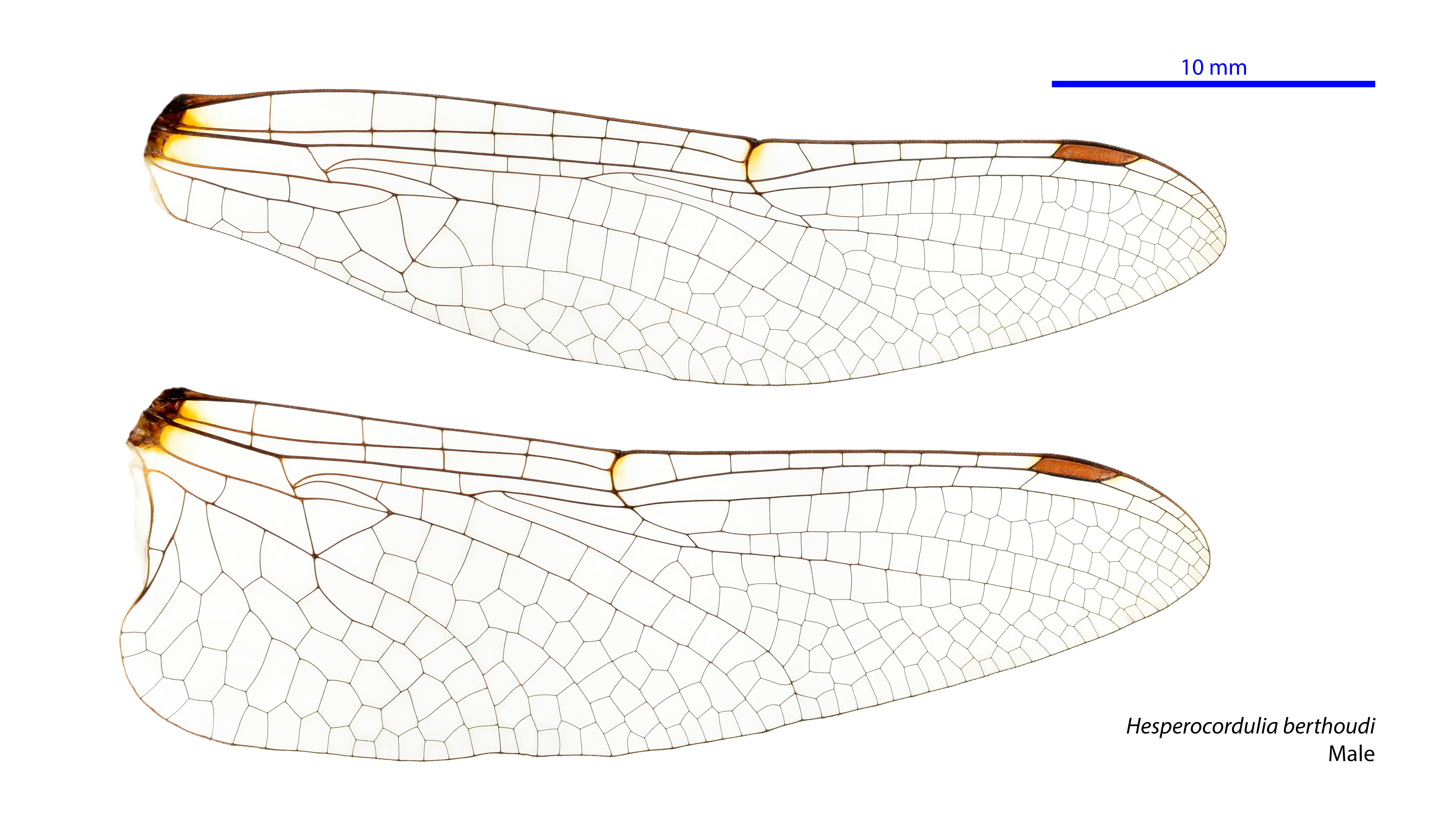
Male wings

== See also ==
- List of Odonata species of Australia
