= Eleuthemis =

Scientific classification
- Kingdom: Animalia
- Phylum: Arthropoda
- Clade: Pancrustacea
- Class: Insecta
- Order: Odonata
- Infraorder: Anisoptera
- Superfamily: Libelluloidea
- Family: Libellulidae
- Genus: Eleuthemis; Ris, 1910

Genus of dragonflies

Eleuthemis, or firebelly, is a genus of dragonflies in the family Libellulidae. There are currently five species in this genus.

== Distribution ==
Eleuthemis are found in Angola, Cameroon, Central African Republic, the Democratic Republic of the Congo, Ivory Coast, Equatorial Guinea, Gabon, Ghana, Guinea, Liberia, Mozambique, Nigeria, Sierra Leone, Tanzania, Togo, Uganda, Zambia, and Zimbabwe.

== Species ==
Species:

- Eleuthemis buettikoferi Ris, 1910
- Eleuthemis eogaster Dijkstra, 2015
- Eleuthemis libera Dijkstra & Kipping, 2015
- Eleuthemis quadrigutta Pinhey, 1974
- Eleuthemis umbrina Dijkstra & Lempert, 2015
