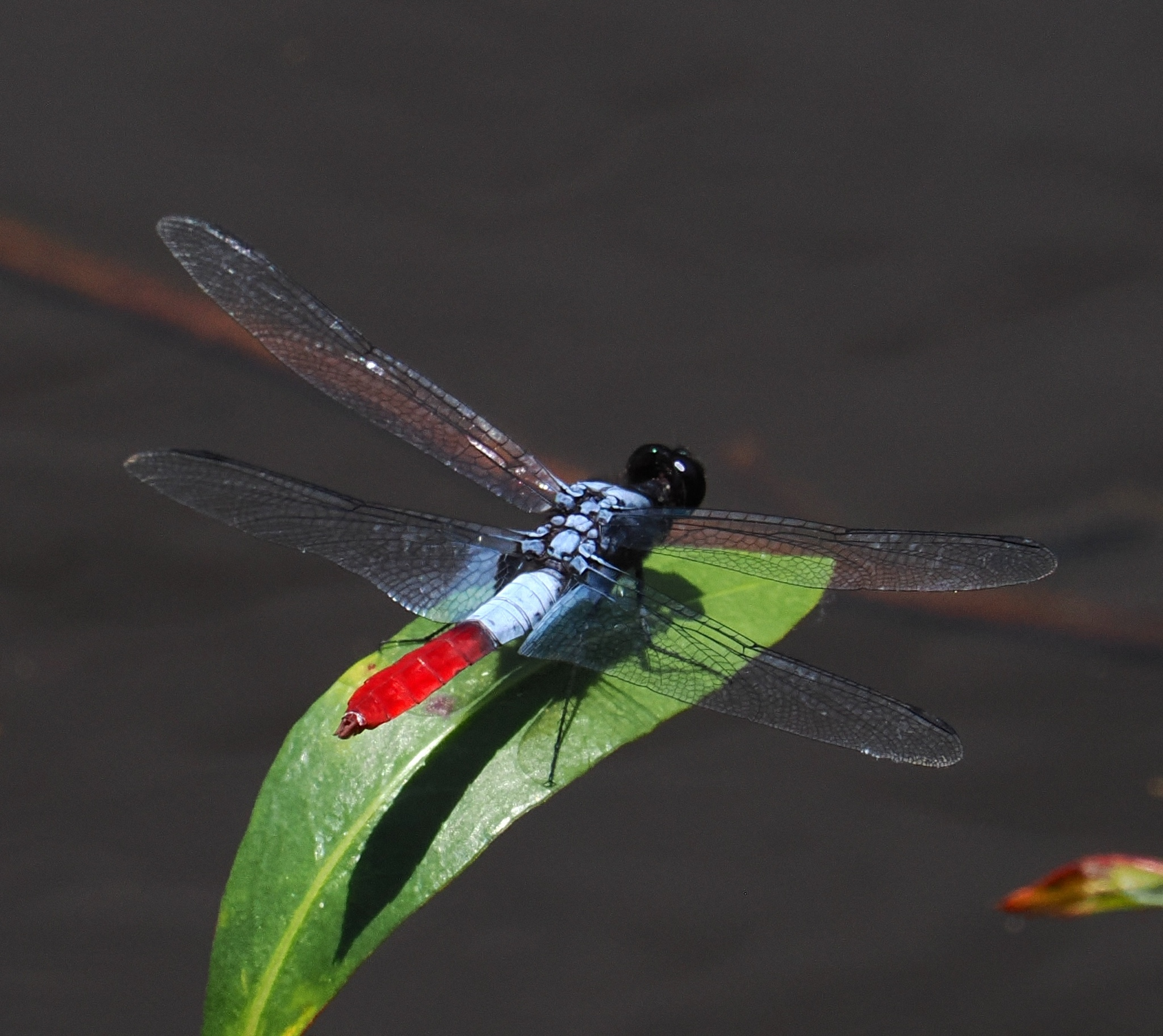
- Planiplax erythropyga

Scientific classification
- Kingdom: Animalia
- Phylum: Arthropoda
- Clade: Pancrustacea
- Class: Insecta
- Order: Odonata
- Infraorder: Anisoptera
- Superfamily: Libelluloidea
- Family: Libellulidae
- Subfamily: Leucorrhiniinae
- Genus: Planiplax; Muttkowski, 1910

Species
- See text

Synonyms
- Platyplax Karsch, 1891

= Planiplax =

Genus of dragonflies

Planiplax is a genus of skimmers in the dragonfly family Libellulidae. There are about five described species in Planiplax.

== Species ==
These five species belong to the genus Planiplax:

- Planiplax arachne Ris, 1912
- Planiplax erythropyga (Karsch, 1891)
- Planiplax machadoi Santos, 1949
- Planiplax phoenicura Ris, 1912
- Planiplax sanguiniventris (Calvert, 1907) (Mexican scarlet-tail)
