= Apocordulia =

Conservation status
- Least Concern (IUCN 3.1)

Scientific classification
- Kingdom: Animalia
- Phylum: Arthropoda
- Clade: Pancrustacea
- Class: Insecta
- Order: Odonata
- Suborder: Anisoptera
- Superfamily: Libelluloidea
- Family: Austrocorduliidae
- Genus: Apocordulia; Watson, 1980
- Species: A. macrops

Binomial name
- Apocordulia macrops Watson, 1980
- Distribution of Apocordulia macrops in inland south-eastern Australia, mainly within the Murray–Darling Basin

Genus of dragonflies

Apocordulia is a genus of dragonflies in the family Austrocorduliidae, endemic to south-eastern Australia. It is monotypic, containing a single species, Apocordulia macrops.

Apocordulia macrops, commonly known as the nighthawk, is a medium-sized, dull-coloured dragonfly with large eyes. It inhabits inland rivers within the Murray–Darling Basin and is crepuscular, being most active at dawn and dusk.

== Etymology ==
The word Apocordulia is derived from two words: apo from the Greek ἀπό meaning from or away, and Cordulia the genus of dragonfly. Tony Watson described the dragonfly genus Apocordulia as appearing different to the normal appearance of a Cordulia dragonfly.

The species name macrops is derived from two Greek words makros (μακρός) meaning long, and ops (ὤψ) meaning eye, describing the long eye seam.

== Gallery ==
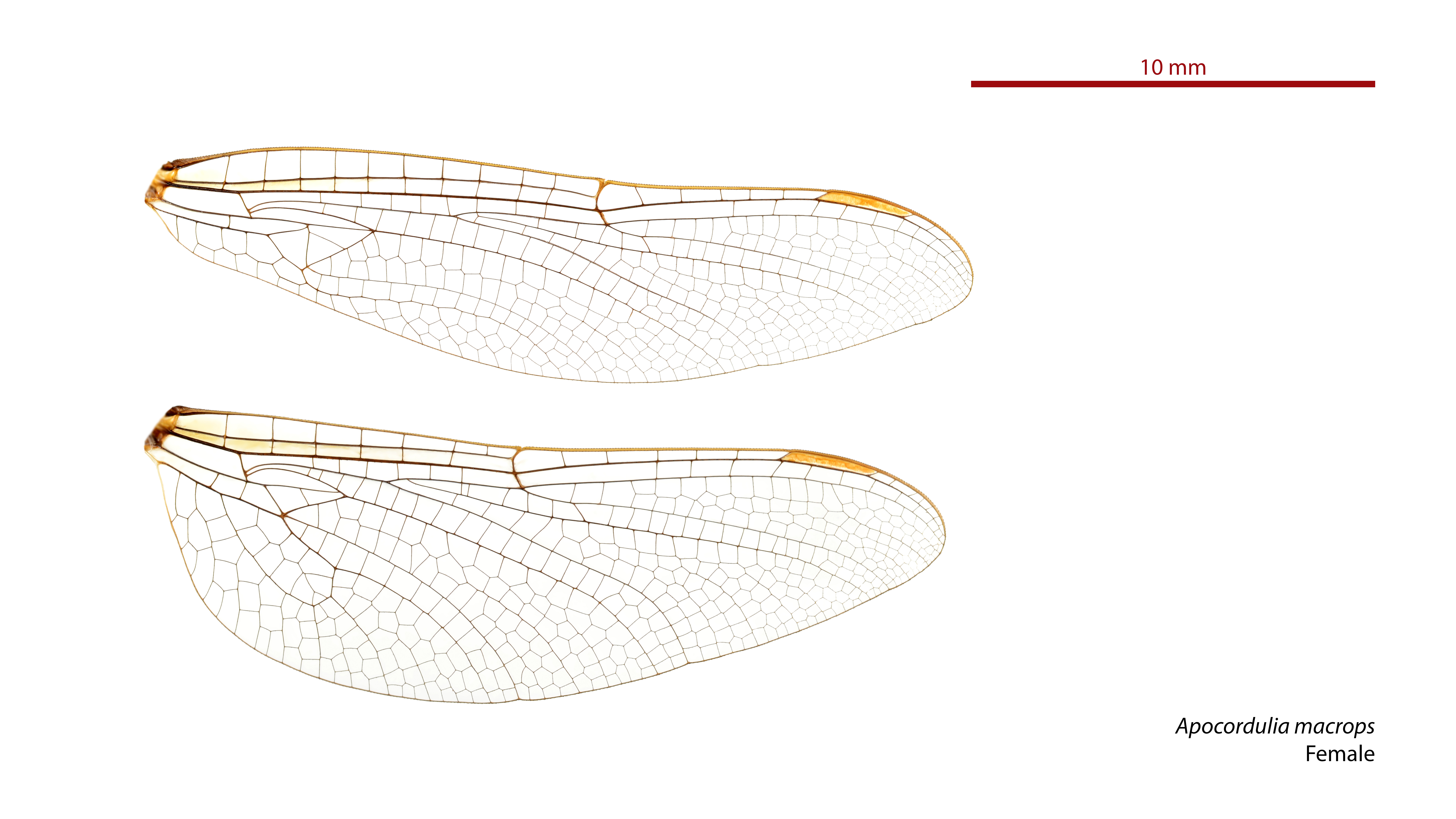
Female Apocordulia macrops wings

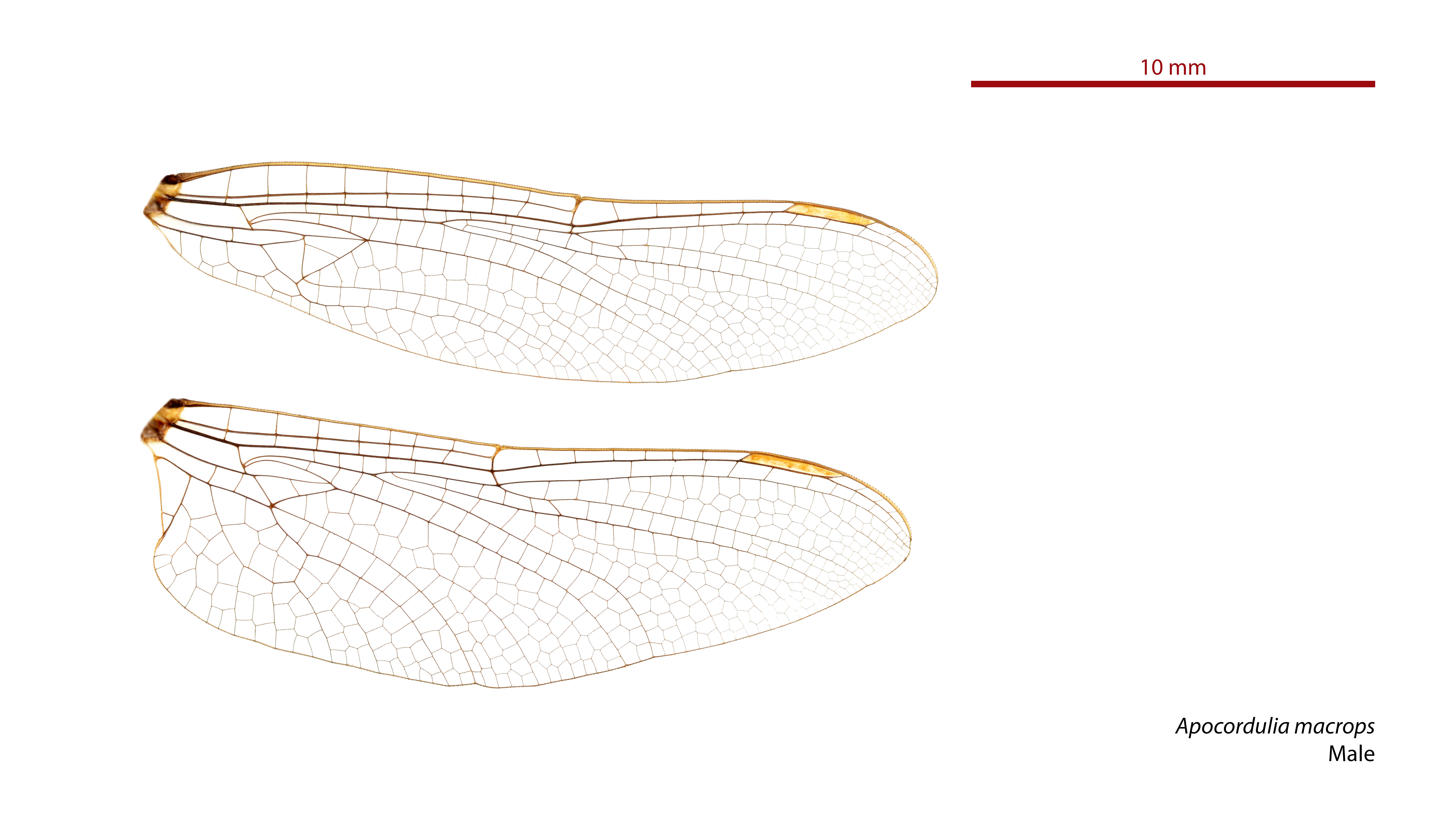
Male Apocordulia macrops wings

== Taxonomy ==
In earlier higher-level classifications, the placement of Apocordulia was uncertain and it was considered incertae sedis within the superfamily Libelluloidea.

A comprehensive phylogenetic revision of emerald and tigertail dragonflies by Goodman et al. (2025) reinstated the family Austrocorduliidae (stat. rev.) and showed that Apocordulia belongs within that family. This replaces earlier treatments that placed Apocordulia variously in Corduliidae or Synthemistidae.

== See also ==
- List of Odonata species of Australia
