= Chalybeothemis chini =

Scientific classification
- Domain: Eukaryota
- Kingdom: Animalia
- Phylum: Arthropoda
- Class: Insecta
- Order: Odonata
- Infraorder: Anisoptera
- Family: Libellulidae
- Genus: Chalybeothemis
- Species: C. chini

Binomial name
- Chalybeothemis chini Dow, Choong & Orr, 2007

Species of dragonfly

Chalybeothemis chini is a species of dragonflies in the family Libellulidae. It is named after the type locality - Tasek Chini (state of Pahang in Peninsular Malaysia). This species has so far been recorded at two sites - Tasek Chini and Kuala Tahan (both in the state of Pahang).
