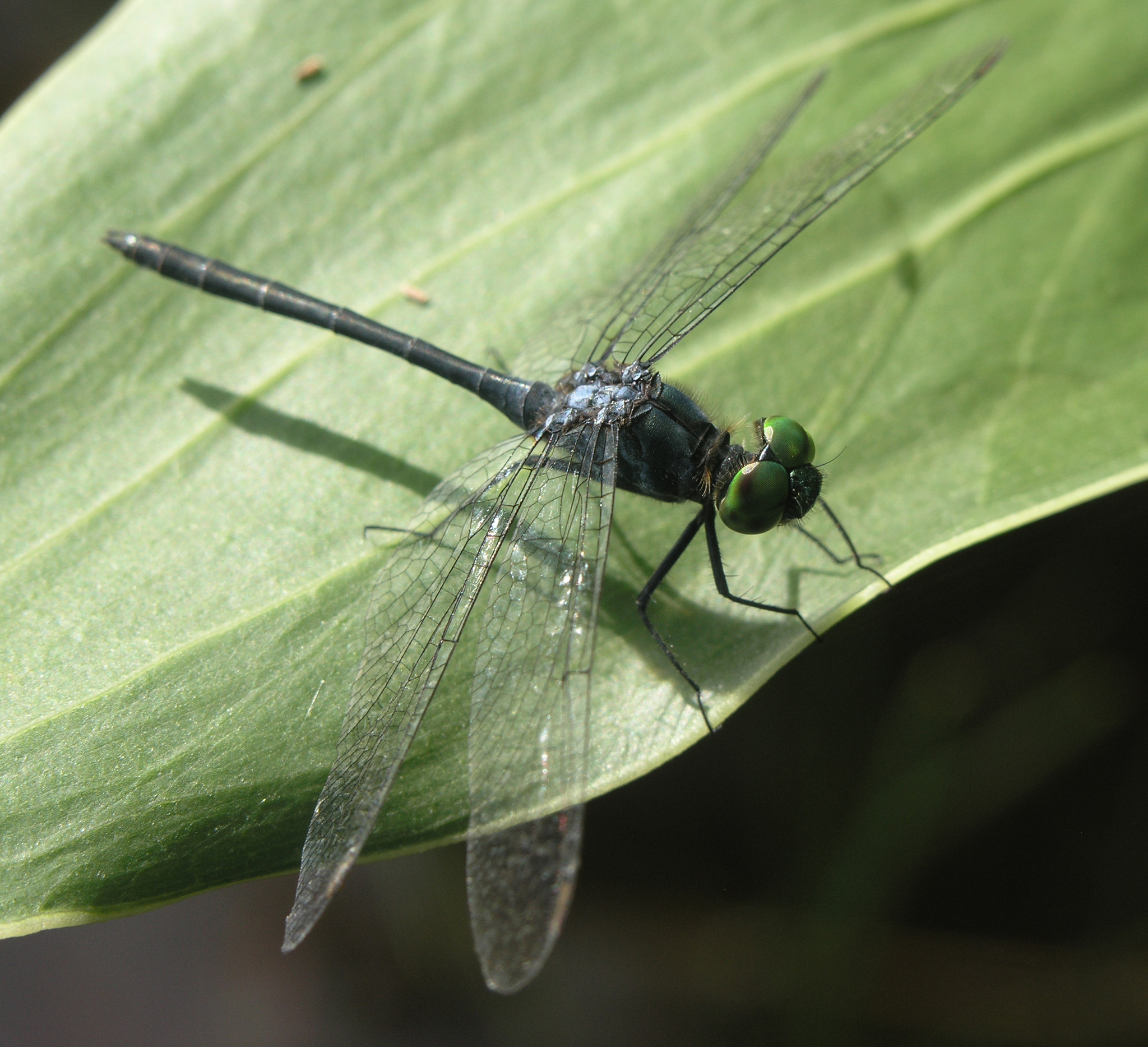

Conservation status
- Least Concern (IUCN 3.1)

Scientific classification
- Kingdom: Animalia
- Phylum: Arthropoda
- Clade: Pancrustacea
- Class: Insecta
- Order: Odonata
- Infraorder: Anisoptera
- Family: Libellulidae
- Genus: Chalybeothemis
- Species: C. fluviatilis

Binomial name
- Chalybeothemis fluviatilis Lieftinck, 1933

= Chalybeothemis fluviatilis =

Species of dragonfly

Chalybeothemis fluviatilis is a species of dragonfly in the family Libellulidae.
