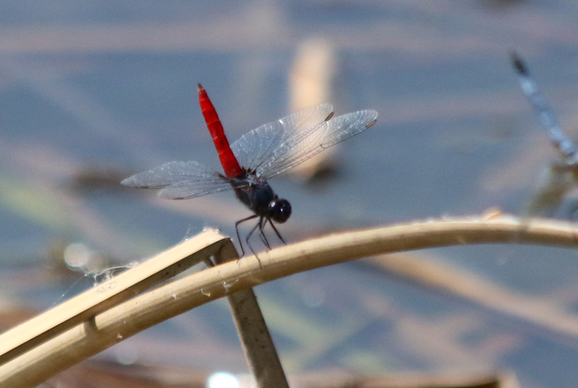

Conservation status
- Least Concern (IUCN 3.1)

Scientific classification
- Kingdom: Animalia
- Phylum: Arthropoda
- Class: Insecta
- Order: Odonata
- Infraorder: Anisoptera
- Family: Libellulidae
- Genus: Planiplax
- Species: P. sanguiniventris

Binomial name
- Planiplax sanguiniventris (Calvert, 1907)

= Planiplax sanguiniventris =

Species of dragonfly

Planiplax sanguiniventris, the Mexican scarlet-tail, is a species of skimmer in the dragonfly family Libellulidae. It is found in Central America.

The IUCN conservation status of Planiplax sanguiniventris is "LC", least concern, with no immediate threat to the species' survival. The population is stable. The IUCN status was reviewed in 2017.
