= Neophya =

Conservation status
- Least Concern (IUCN 3.1)

Scientific classification
- Kingdom: Animalia
- Phylum: Arthropoda
- Clade: Pancrustacea
- Class: Insecta
- Order: Odonata
- Infraorder: Anisoptera
- Superfamily: Libelluloidea
- Family: Neophyidae; Tillyard and Fraser, 1940
- Genus: Neophya; Selys, 1881
- Species: N. rutherfordi

Binomial name
- Neophya rutherfordi Selys, 1881
- Distribution of Neophya

Family of dragonflies

Neophya is a monotypic genus of dragonflies and the only genus in the family Neophyidae, which is placed in the superfamily Libelluloidea. Its only living species, Neophya rutherfordi, occurs in the tropical rainforests of western and central Africa.

== Description ==
The sole living species, Neophya rutherfordi, is a small, slender dragonfly with a narrow abdomen and broad amber-tinted hindwings. The hindwings are conspicuously widened at the base, a feature unique among the closely related families of Libelluloidea.

Adults combine both primitive and specialised characteristics. Tillyard and Fraser considered Neophya an isolated lineage combining archaic and specialised features, making its relationships to other dragonflies difficult to determine.

The aquatic larvae have a broad, deeply cleft labium and robust dorsal spines on the thorax, features that distinguish them from the larvae of related families.

== Distribution and habitat ==
Neophya occurs in the tropical rainforests of western and central Africa. Its sole living species, Neophya rutherfordi, is known from Cameroon, Equatorial Guinea, Gabon, the Republic of the Congo and the Democratic Republic of the Congo.

Adults inhabit shaded lowland rainforest, while the aquatic larvae develop in small forest streams and slow-moving channels beneath a closed canopy. Larvae have been collected from both gently flowing streams and swampy forest waters, indicating that the species occupies a range of freshwater habitats within intact rainforest.

== Family classification ==
Selys established the genus Neophya in 1881 for a distinctive dragonfly from Old Calabar, describing it as sufficiently different from all known genera to warrant a separate genus. He considered it most closely related to the Australian genus Cordulephya, but also noted similarities with Gomphomacromia and Oxygastra.

Tillyard and Fraser (1940) established the subfamily Neophyinae to accommodate Neophya, recognising it as an isolated lineage within the then broadly defined family Corduliidae. Fraser retained this arrangement in his subsequent classification of dragonflies.

Molecular phylogenetic studies later demonstrated that Neophya represents a distinct evolutionary lineage within Libelluloidea. Goodman and colleagues (2025) restored Neophyidae to family rank as a monotypic family containing only Neophya.

== Species ==
The only living species currently placed in Neophya is:

- Neophya rutherfordi

== Fossil record ==
The fossil record of Neophyidae extends from the Paleocene to the Eocene. Fossils have been recorded from Argentina and Great Britain, indicating that the family formerly had a much wider distribution than its present restriction to tropical Africa.

The extinct genus Palaeophya is known from the Paleocene of Argentina and includes the species †Palaeophya argentina'.

The extant genus Neophya is represented in the fossil record by †Neophya legrandi', described from the Eocene of Great Britain.

=== Fossil species ===
The following extinct species are currently assigned to Neophyidae:

- Neophya
  - †Neophya legrandi Nel & Fleck, 2014
- †Palaeophya Petrulevičius & Nel, 2009
  - †Palaeophya argentina Petrulevičius & Nel, 2009

== Etymology ==
The family name Neophyidae is derived from the type genus Neophya, with the zoological suffix -idae denoting a family.

The genus name Neophya presumably combines the Greek νέος (néos, "new") with phya, referring to its perceived relationship with the Australian genus Cordulephya, which Selys considered its closest relative when establishing the genus in 1881.

The species name rutherfordi honours Rutherford, who collected the type specimen in West Africa. In the original description, Selys explained that the specimen had been sent to him by Robert McLachlan, who asked him to describe the new genus and suggested dedicating the species to Rutherford, "who collected many interesting neuropteran insects in West Africa".
