= Austrocorduliidae =

Scientific classification
- Kingdom: Animalia
- Phylum: Arthropoda
- Clade: Pancrustacea
- Class: Insecta
- Order: Odonata
- Infraorder: Anisoptera
- Superfamily: Libelluloidea
- Family: Austrocorduliidae; Bechly, 1996
- Distribution of Austrocorduliidae

Family of dragonflies

Austrocorduliidae is a small family of dragonflies found in Australia and South Africa.

== Characteristics ==
Members of Austrocorduliidae are medium-sized dragonflies, often with dark metallic colouring. They typically inhabit streams, rivers and forested wetlands, and several species are adapted to cool montane habitats.

== Taxonomic history ==
Austrocorduliidae has had a complex taxonomic history. Although the family was generally associated with the superfamily Libelluloidea, its precise placement remained uncertain for many years, and its genera were variously assigned by different authors.

Molecular and morphological analyses published in 2025 helped to resolve this uncertainty. These studies supported Austrocorduliidae as a distinct lineage within Libelluloidea and provided a clearer framework for the family’s composition.

Some genera now included in Austrocorduliidae — such as Cordulephya — have previously been placed in other families, but are treated within Austrocorduliidae in the current World Odonata List (2025).

== Genera ==
The following genera are currently placed in Austrocorduliidae:

- Apocordulia Watson, 1980
- Austrocordulia Tillyard, 1909
- Austrophya Tillyard, 1909
- Cordulephya Selys, 1870
- Hesperocordulia Tillyard, 1911
- Lathrocordulia Tillyard, 1911
- Micromidia Fraser, 1959

== Etymology ==
The family name Austrocorduliidae is derived from the type genus Austrocordulia, with the standard zoological suffix -idae used for animal families. The genus name Austrocordulia combines austro- (from Latin auster, “south wind”, hence “southern”) with Cordulia, from Greek κορδύλη (kordylē, “club” or “cudgel”).
