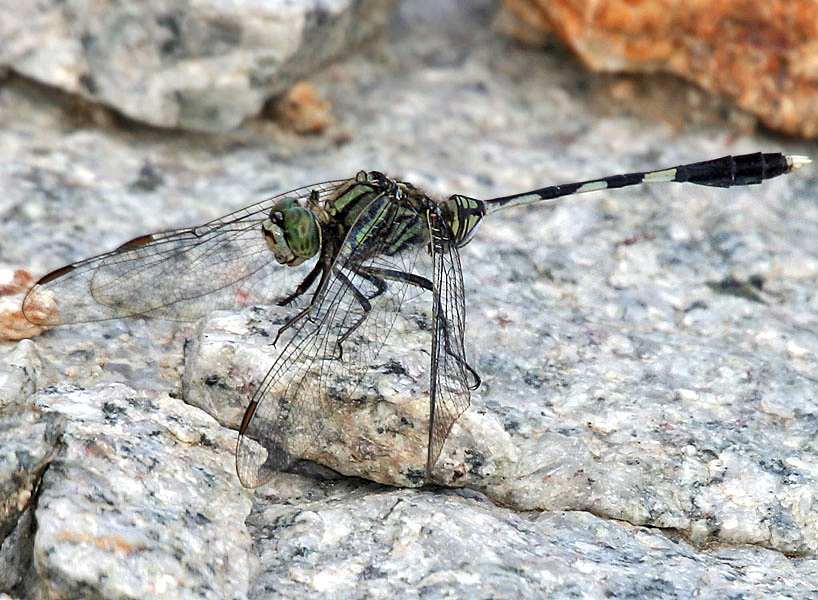
- Orthetrum sabina

Scientific classification
- Kingdom: Animalia
- Phylum: Arthropoda
- Clade: Pancrustacea
- Class: Insecta
- Order: Odonata
- Infraorder: Anisoptera
- Clade: Cavilabiata
- Superfamily: Libelluloidea; Leach, 1815

Families
- Aeschnosomatidae; Austrocorduliidae; Corduliidae; Gomphomacromiidae; Idionychidae; Idomacromiidae; Lauromacromiidae; Libellulidae; Macromidiidae; Macromiidae; Neophyidae; Pseudocorduliidae; Synthemistidae
- Distribution of Libelluloidea

= Libelluloidea =

Libelluloidea Temporal range: Berriasian to present

Superfamily of dragonflies

Libelluloidea is the most species-rich superfamily of dragonflies, comprising 13 families.

The superfamily includes the skimmers, cruisers, emeralds and their relatives, and represents one of the most diverse evolutionary radiations within modern dragonflies.

Recent phylogenetic studies using morphological and molecular data have substantially revised the classification of the group, including the recognition and restoration of several families.

== Taxonomic history ==
The superfamily Libelluloidea was established by Leach in 1815.

Historically, the classification of libelluloid dragonflies has been unstable, particularly regarding the limits of Corduliidae, Synthemistidae and related families.

In 2025, a major phylogenetic revision using morphological and molecular data recognised three new families and restored six previously synonymised families within Libelluloidea.

Since 2013, the following family names have generally been treated as invalid, synonymised or disputed:

- Cordulephyidae
- Oxygastridae
- Hemicorduliidae
- Urothemistidae

Alternative phylogenetic names proposed for libelluloid dragonflies by Bechly included Anauriculida and Italoansida in 1996, and Eurypalpidomorpha in 2003.

== Phylogeny ==
Phylogenetic studies support Libelluloidea as a natural evolutionary group of dragonflies closely related to Cordulegastroidea.

Libelluloidea is generally recovered as the sister group to Cordulegastroidea.

- - Cordulegastroidea
  - Libelluloidea

== Families ==
The following families are currently placed in Libelluloidea:

- Aeschnosomatidae Goodman, Abbott, Bybee, Ehlert, Frandsen, Guralnick, Kalkman, Newton, Pinto & Ware, 2025
- Austrocorduliidae Bechly, 1996
- Corduliidae Kirby, 1890
- Gomphomacromiidae Tillyard & Fraser, 1940
- Idionychidae Tillyard & Fraser, 1940
- Idomacromiidae Tillyard & Fraser, 1940
- Lauromacromiidae Goodman, Abbott, Bybee, Ehlert, Frandsen, Guralnick, Kalkman, Newton, Pinto & Ware, 2025
- Libellulidae Leach, 1815
- Macromidiidae Goodman, Abbott, Bybee, Ehlert, Frandsen, Guralnick, Kalkman, Newton, Pinto & Ware, 2025
- Macromiidae Needham, 1903
- Neophyidae Tillyard & Fraser, 1940
- Pseudocorduliidae Lohmann, 1996
- Synthemistidae Tillyard, 1911

== Fossil record ==
The superfamily includes numerous extinct fossil taxa known from the Cretaceous and later deposits, including:

- †Austrolibellula Petrulevičius & Nel, 2003
- †Araripelibellulidae Bechly, 1996
- †Araripephlebiidae Bechly, 1998
- †Bolcacorduliidae Gentilini, 2002
- †Eocorduliidae Bechly, 1996
- †Palaeomacromiidae Petrulevičius, Nel & Muzón, 1999 (=Bolcathemidae Gentilini, 2002)
- †Valdicorduliidae Bechly, 1996
- †Urolibellulidae Zeiri, Nel & Garrouste, 2015

The oldest known member of Libelluloidea is Araripelibellula brittanica from the Berriasian of England.

Libelluloidea and Cordulegastroidea together form a major evolutionary lineage of dragonflies.

== Etymology ==
The superfamily name Libelluloidea is derived from the type genus Libellula and the zoological suffix -oidea, used for superfamilies.

The genus name Libellula is the diminutive form of the Latin libella ("small balance" or "level"), possibly referring to the horizontal position of the wings.

== See also ==
- List of dragonflies of the world
