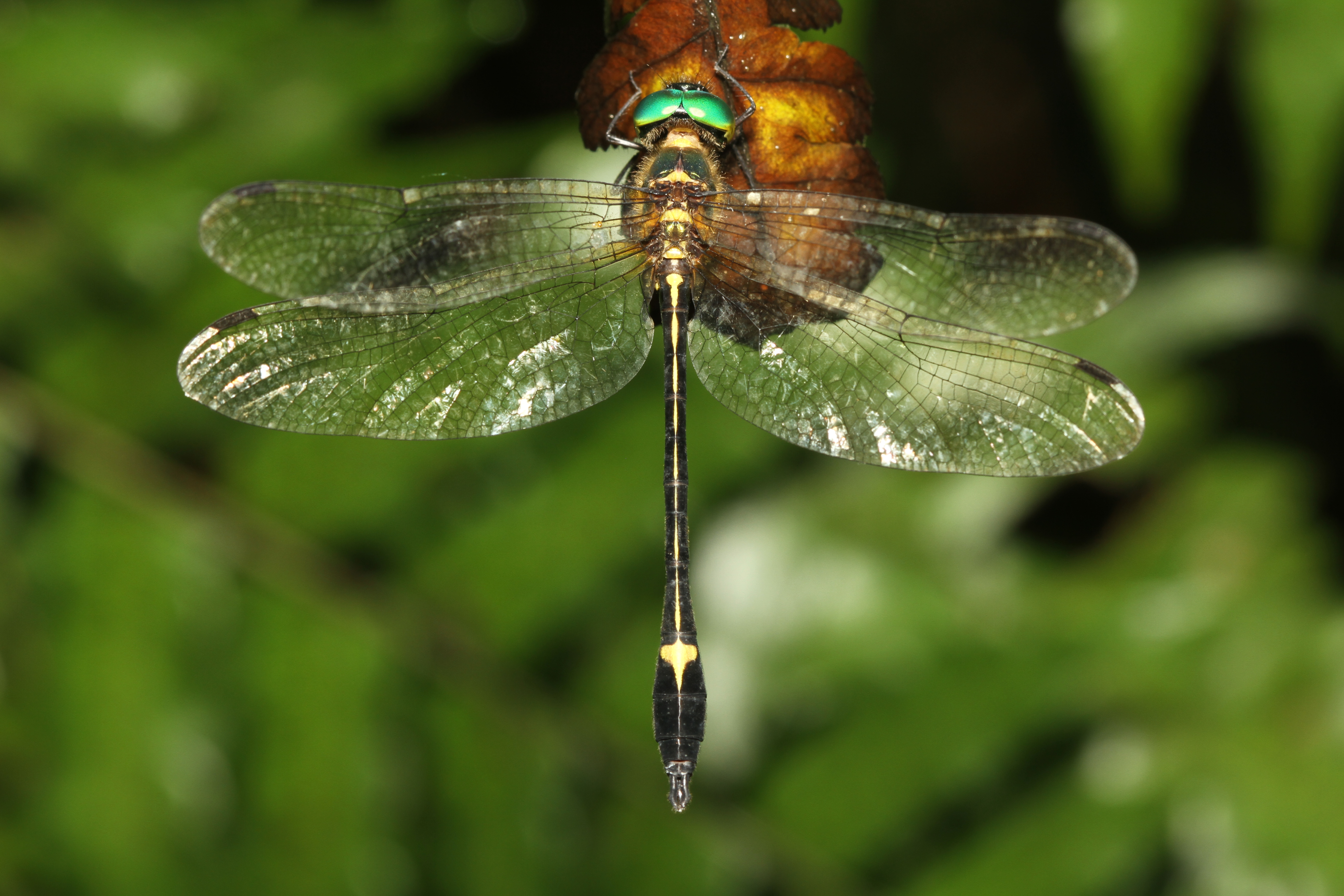
- Male

Conservation status
- Least Concern (IUCN 3.1)

Scientific classification
- Kingdom: Animalia
- Phylum: Arthropoda
- Clade: Pancrustacea
- Class: Insecta
- Order: Odonata
- Infraorder: Anisoptera
- Superfamily: Libelluloidea
- Family: Macromidiidae
- Genus: Macromidia
- Species: M. donaldi

Binomial name
- Macromidia donaldi (Fraser, 1924)

Synonyms
- Indomacromia donaldi Fraser, 1924

= Macromidia donaldi =

Species of dragonfly

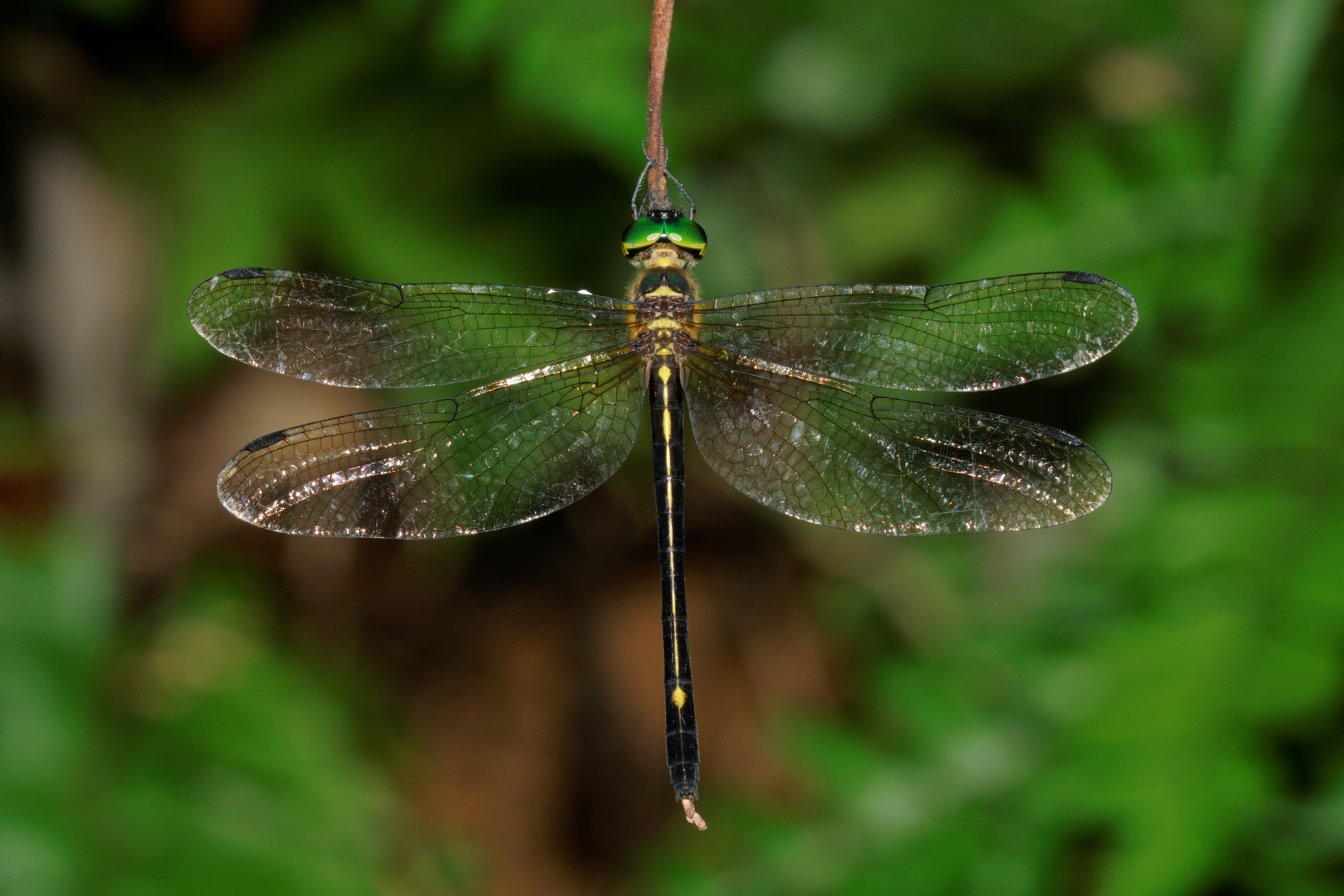
Female

Macromidia donaldi is a species of dragonfly in the family Macromidiidae. It is known only from the Western Ghats of India and from Sri Lanka.

== Description and habitat ==
It is a small metallic-green dragonfly with emerald-green eyes. Its lateral sides of the thorax and dorsal side of the abdomen have yellow stripes up to segment 6. Segment 7 has a broad "ace of clubs" like mark on dorsal side. Remaining segments are unmarked. Female is similar to the male. They are crepuscular in nature and rest in vegetation near forest streams during day.

== See also ==
- List of odonates of India
- List of odonates of Sri Lanka
- List of odonata of Kerala
