= Macromidia ishidai =

Conservation status
- Least Concern (IUCN 3.1)

Scientific classification
- Kingdom: Animalia
- Phylum: Arthropoda
- Clade: Pancrustacea
- Class: Insecta
- Order: Odonata
- Infraorder: Anisoptera
- Superfamily: Libelluloidea
- Family: Macromidiidae
- Genus: Macromidia
- Species: M. ishidai

Binomial name
- Macromidia ishidai Asahina, 1964

Synonyms
- Macromia ishidai (Asahina, 1964)

Species of dragonfly

Macromidia ishidai is a species of dragonfly in the family Macromidiidae. It is endemic to Japan.
