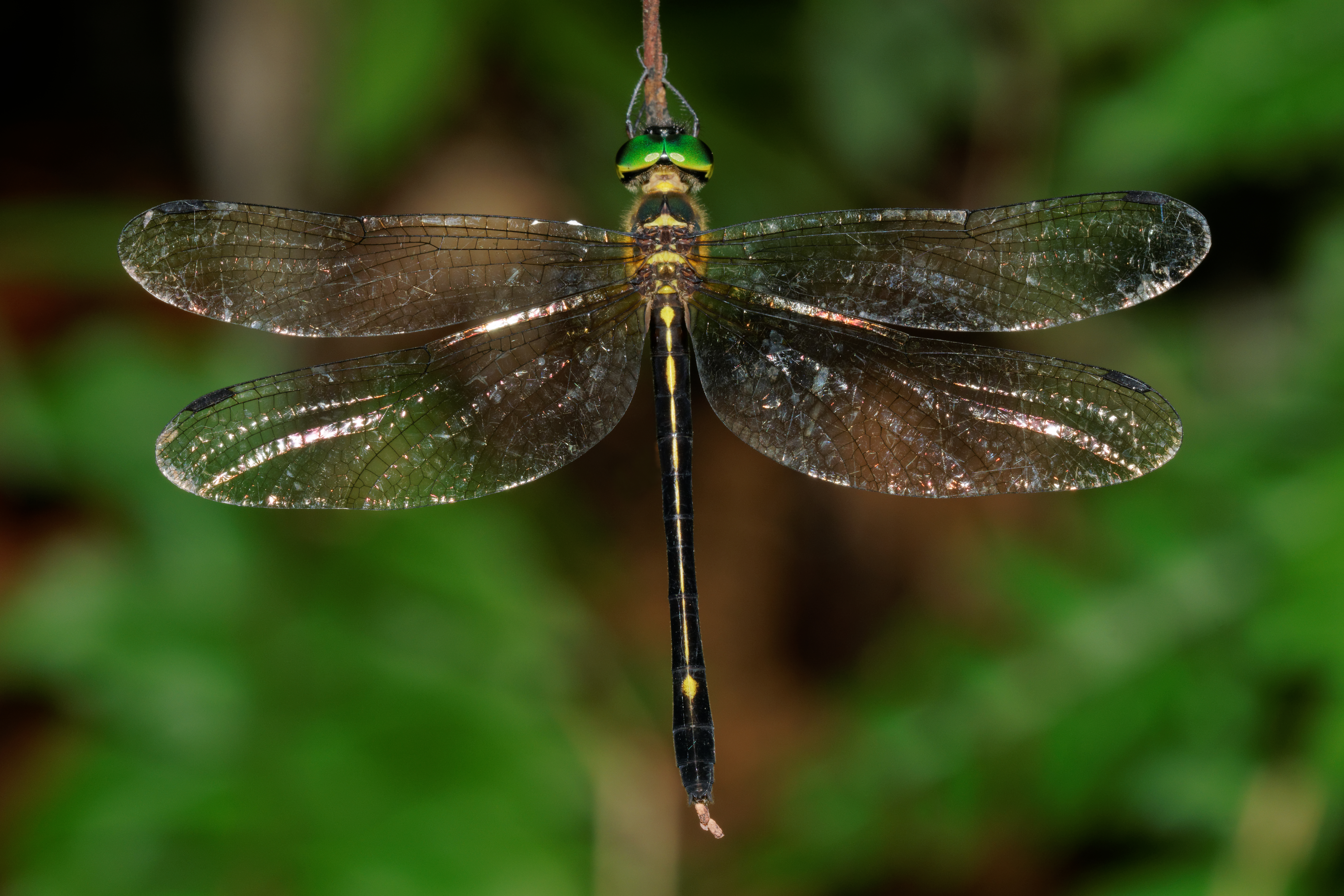
- Macromidia donaldi

Scientific classification
- Kingdom: Animalia
- Phylum: Arthropoda
- Clade: Pancrustacea
- Class: Insecta
- Order: Odonata
- Infraorder: Anisoptera
- Superfamily: Libelluloidea
- Family: Macromidiidae; Goodman, Abbott, Bybee, Ehlert, Frandsen, Guralnick, Kalkman, Newton, Pinto & Ware, 2025
- Genus: Macromidia; Martin, 1906

Species
- Macromidia asahinai; Macromidia atrovirens; Macromidia donaldi; Macromidia ellenae; Macromidia fulva; Macromidia genialis; Macromidia ishidai; Macromidia kelloggi; Macromidia rapida; Macromidia samal
- Distribution of Macromidia

= Macromidia =

Genus of dragonflies

Macromidia is a genus of dragonflies in the family Macromidiidae. The genus comprises ten recognised species distributed from India and Sri Lanka east through Southeast Asia to China, Taiwan and Japan.

Macromidia species inhabit forest streams, where the adults are fast-flying and often active only during brief periods at dawn, dusk or on cloudy days. They are medium- to large-sized dragonflies with metallic green or bronze bodies, typically marked with yellow, and are among the least frequently encountered dragonflies because of their secretive habits and preference for dense forest.

== Description ==
Macromidia are medium-sized dragonflies with metallic green or bronze bodies marked with yellow. They have relatively short legs, large contiguous eyes and a slender cylindrical abdomen that broadens slightly towards the tip.

Many species show marked sexual dimorphism. Males generally have clear wings, whereas females often have broad amber or smoky markings, particularly at the wing bases, giving them a noticeably different appearance.

René Martin considered Macromidia to be most closely related to Macromia and Idionyx, although it differs from both in the structure of the wings and the male anal appendages.

== Behaviour ==
Macromidia are elusive dragonflies that spend much of their time beneath the forest canopy. Adults are typically encountered along shaded streams and rivers, where they fly rapidly through tunnels formed by overhanging vegetation before disappearing into the surrounding foliage.

F. C. Fraser observed that Macromidia donaldi was active mainly on cloudy days and suggested that the genus may be crepuscular, flying chiefly at dawn or dusk. Individuals often emerged briefly to patrol a stretch of stream before returning to concealed perches among dense vegetation.

Field observations of Asian species have confirmed similar behaviour. Males patrol shaded pools and riffles along forest streams, often flying low over the water before hanging beneath leaves or branches, making them difficult to observe despite being locally common.

== Distribution and habitat ==
Macromidia is distributed across the Oriental region, from India and Sri Lanka east through mainland Southeast Asia to southern China, Taiwan and Japan.

Species inhabit well-shaded forest streams and small rivers, particularly in hilly and mountainous regions. Adults are most often found along clear, fast-flowing streams beneath a closed canopy, where they patrol pools, riffles and waterfalls. Some species also occur along larger forest rivers, but all appear to depend on intact woodland habitats.

== Taxonomic history ==
Martin established the genus Macromidia in 1906 for Macromidia rapida from northern Vietnam, recognising it as closely related to Macromia and Idionyx but sufficiently distinct to warrant a separate genus.

Fraser (1924) later proposed the genus Indomacromia for several Indian species, but subsequently concluded that the differences were insufficient to justify a separate genus and transferred them to Macromidia.

For much of the twentieth century, Macromidia was placed in the family Corduliidae, although its relationships with other dragonfly genera remained uncertain. Molecular phylogenetic studies subsequently showed that it represents a distinct lineage within the superfamily Libelluloidea, and Goodman and colleagues (2025) recognised it as the sole living genus of the family Macromidiidae.

== Classification ==
The following genus and species are currently placed in the family Macromidiidae:

- Macromidia Goodman, Abbott, Bybee, Ehlert, Frandsen, Guralnick, Kalkman, Newton, Pinto & Ware, 2025
  - Macromidia asahinai Lieftinck, 1971
  - Macromidia atrovirens Lieftinck, 1935
  - Macromidia donaldi (Fraser, 1924)
  - Macromidia ellenae Wilson, 1996
  - Macromidia fulva Laidlaw, 1915
  - Macromidia genialis Laidlaw, 1923
  - Macromidia ishidai Asahina, 1964
  - Macromidia kelloggi Asahina, 1978
  - Macromidia rapida Martin, 1907
  - Macromidia samal Needham & Gyger, 1937

== Etymology ==
The family name Macromidiidae is derived from the type genus Macromidia, with the zoological suffix -idae denoting a family.

Martin did not explain the origin of the generic name Macromidia, but when establishing the genus he noted its similarities to Macromia and Idionyx. The name Macromidia may therefore have been intended to reflect its intermediate appearance between these two genera.
