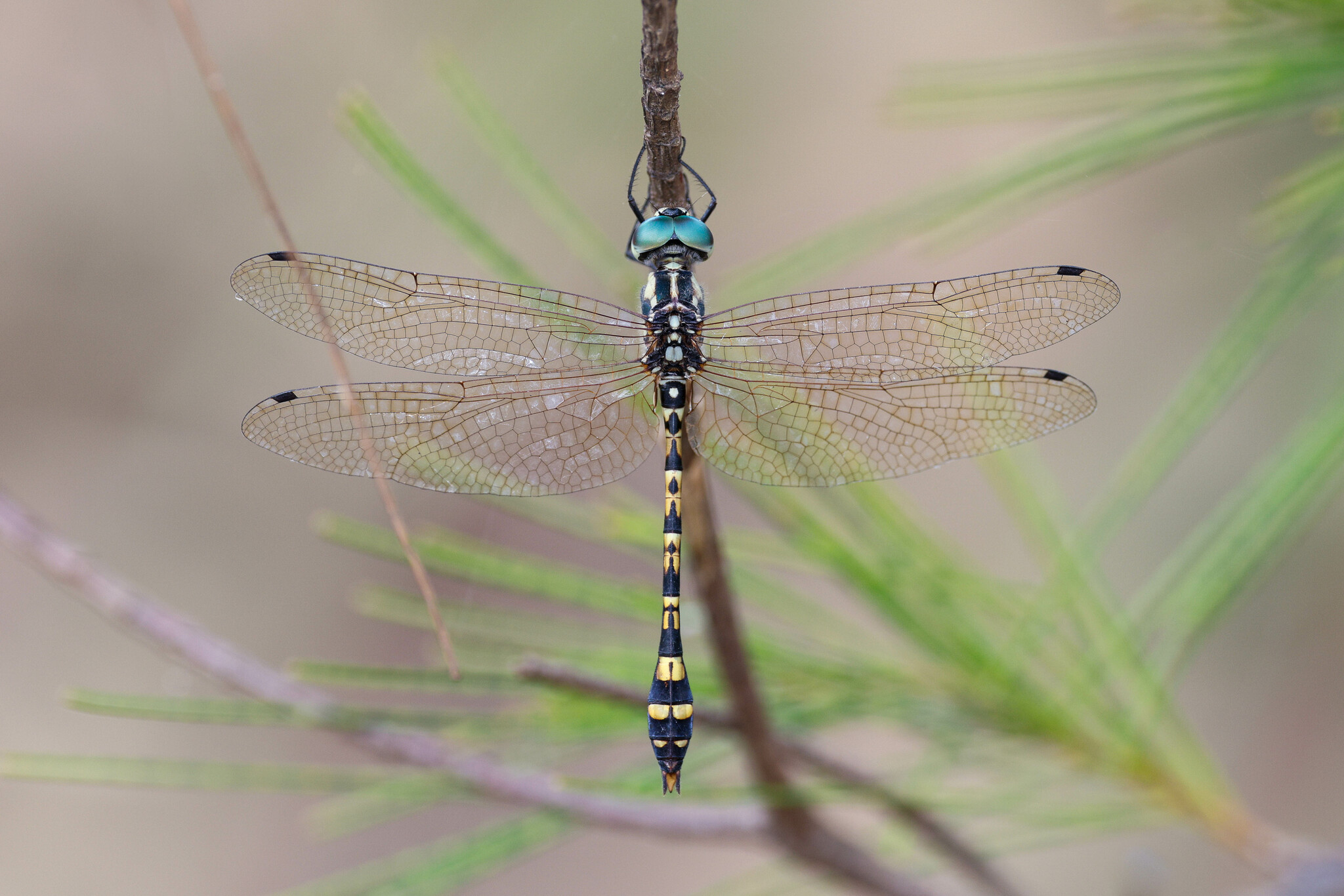
- Male
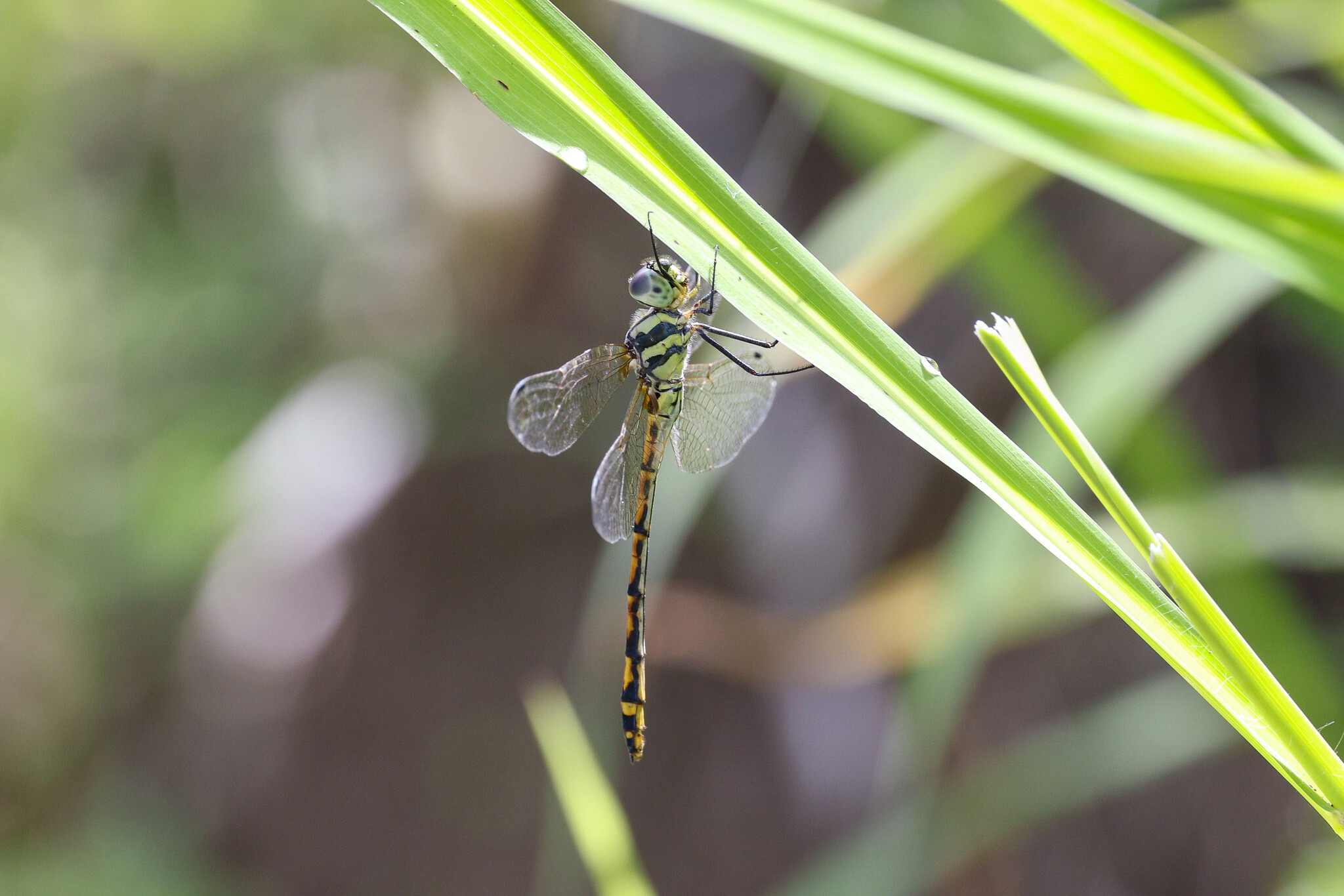
- Female

Conservation status
- Least Concern (IUCN 3.1)

Scientific classification
- Kingdom: Animalia
- Phylum: Arthropoda
- Clade: Pancrustacea
- Class: Insecta
- Order: Odonata
- Suborder: Anisoptera
- Superfamily: Libelluloidea
- Family: Aeschnosomatidae
- Genus: Pentathemis
- Species: P. membranulata

Binomial name
- Pentathemis membranulata Karsch, 1890

= Pentathemis membranulata =

Metallic tigerhawk

Species of dragonfly

Pentathemis membranulata, commonly known as the metallic tigerhawk, is a species of dragonfly in the family Aeschnosomatidae.

Pentathemis is a monotypic genus containing only Pentathemis membranulata.

Pentathemis membranulata is endemic to the Top End of Australia's Northern Territory, where it inhabits rivers, streams and lagoons.

It is a small to medium-sized dragonfly with a metallic-black body marked with yellow, and females with darkened wingtips.

== Taxonomic history ==
In 1890, Karsch established Pentathemis as a new genus for Pentathemis membranulata, based on a female specimen collected in northern Australia. Karsch regarded the species as highly unusual because of its wing venation. He noted that the venation combined features seen in several libelluloid groups, making the systematic placement of the genus uncertain.

Karsch distinguished the genus by the shape of the forewing triangle, which he described as five-sided and divided by a crossvein. He also noted the large membranule at the base of the hindwing, a feature reflected in the species name membranulata.

Later examination of additional specimens showed that the original female specimen described by Karsch was aberrant, and that the forewing triangle is normally three-sided.

The genus has historically been placed in classifications of the families Corduliidae and Synthemistidae, but is currently classified in the family Aeschnosomatidae.

== Description ==
Pentathemis membranulata is a small to medium-sized dragonfly with a metallic-black to dark brown body marked with contrasting yellow to cream stripes and patches. In life, the eyes are emerald green above and pale green below.

The abdomen narrows towards the middle and becomes strongly clubbed towards the end, particularly in the male. The wings are transparent with brown veins and a large grey membranule extending beyond the anal triangle of the hindwing. Females, particularly subadults, have dark brown wing tips.

== Distribution and habitat ==
Pentathemis membranulata is endemic to northern Australia, where it has been recorded from the Top End of the Northern Territory, northern Western Australia, and Cape York Peninsula in Queensland.

It inhabits streams, rivers, riverine lagoons and possibly ponds.

== Etymology ==
The genus name Pentathemis is derived from the Greek πέντα (penta, "five") and -themis, from Greek Θέμις (Themis), the goddess of divine law, order and justice. In early odonate taxonomy, names ending in -themis were introduced by Hermann August Hagen and were widely used for dragonflies. The name refers to the five-sided triangle in the forewing of the original specimen, a feature later shown to be aberrant.

The species name membranulata is derived from the Latin membranula ("small membrane"), itself a diminutive of membrana ("membrane"), together with the suffix -ata ("provided with"), referring to the distinctive membranule at the base of the wing.

== Gallery ==
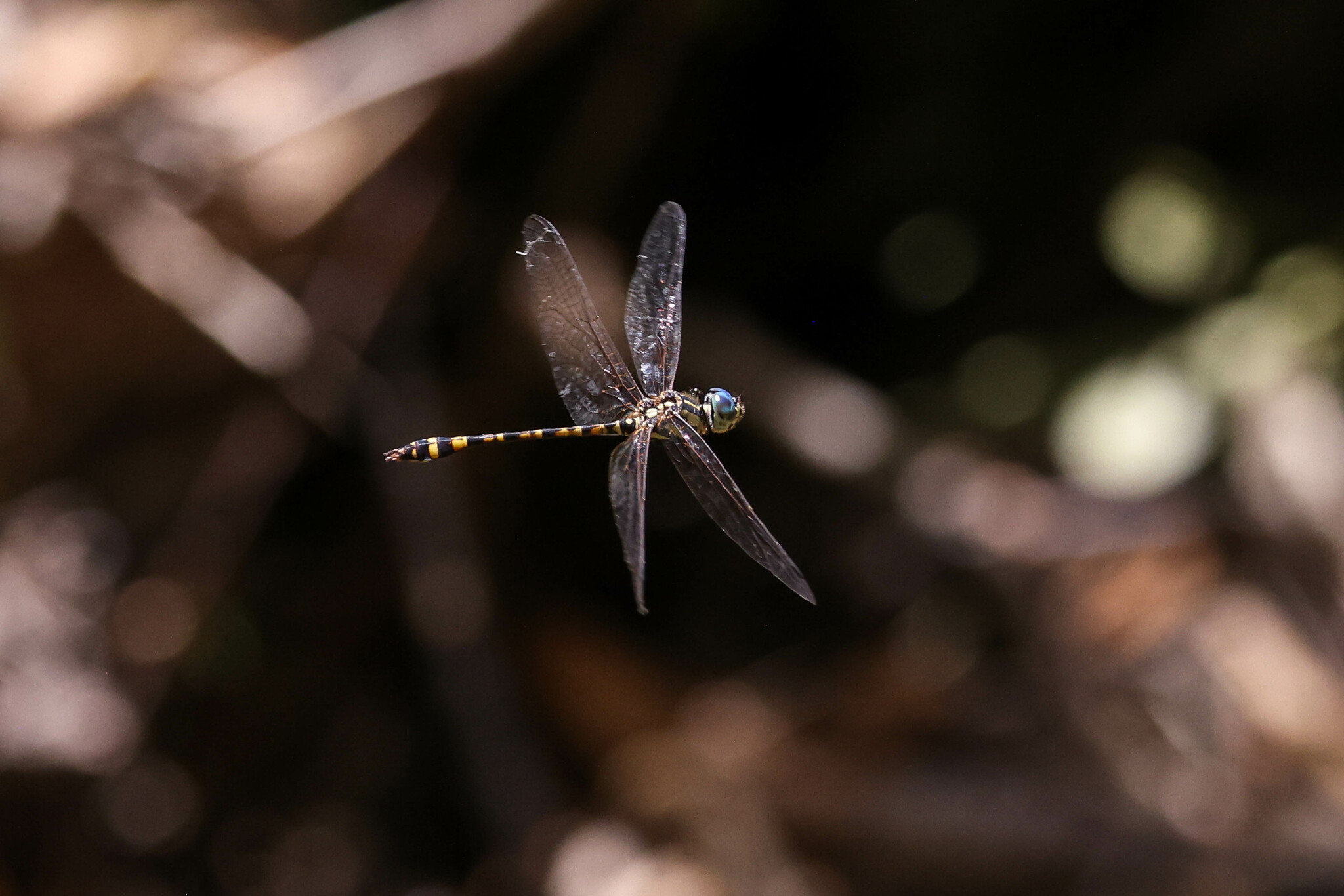
Male in flight

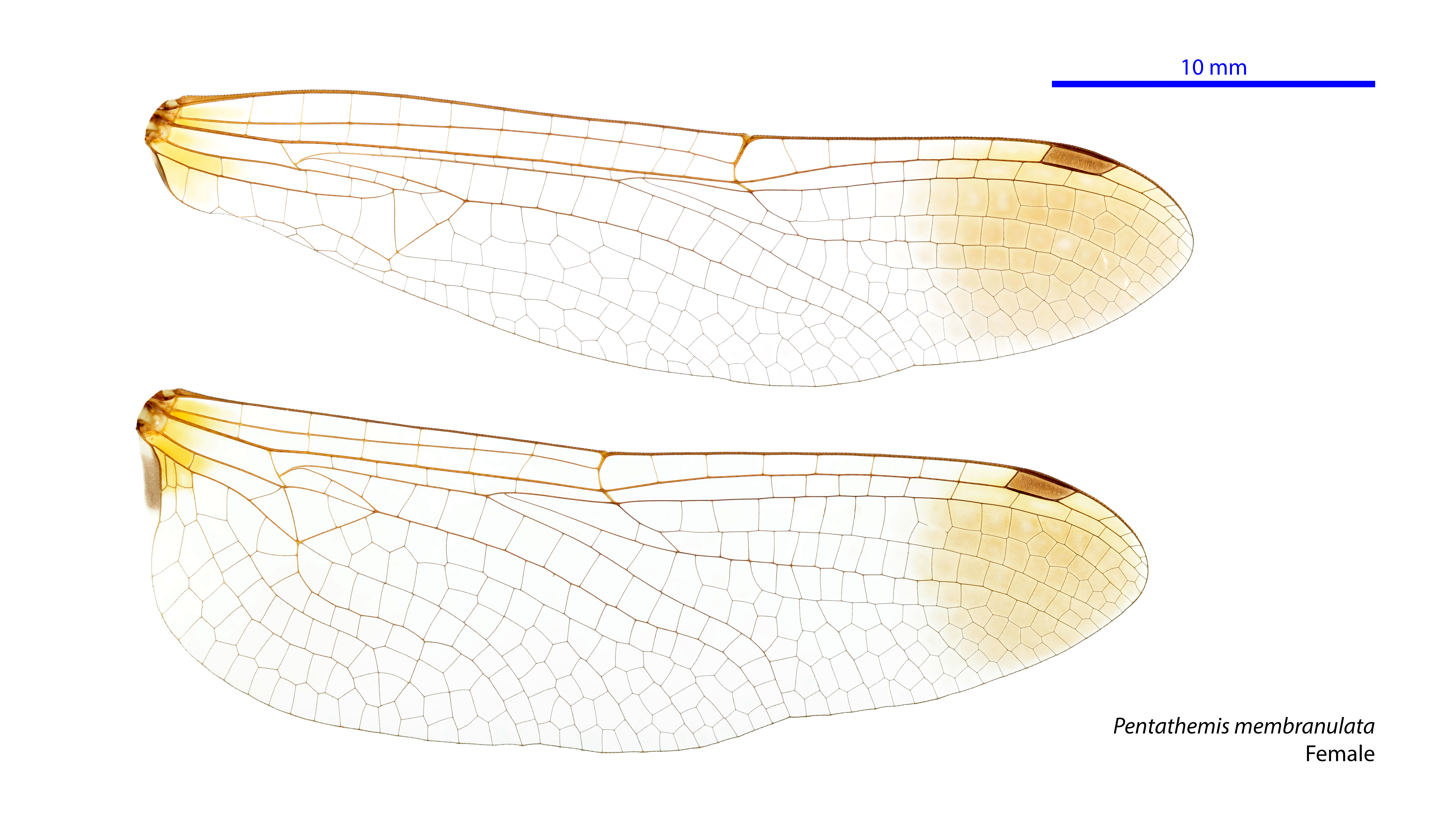
Female wings

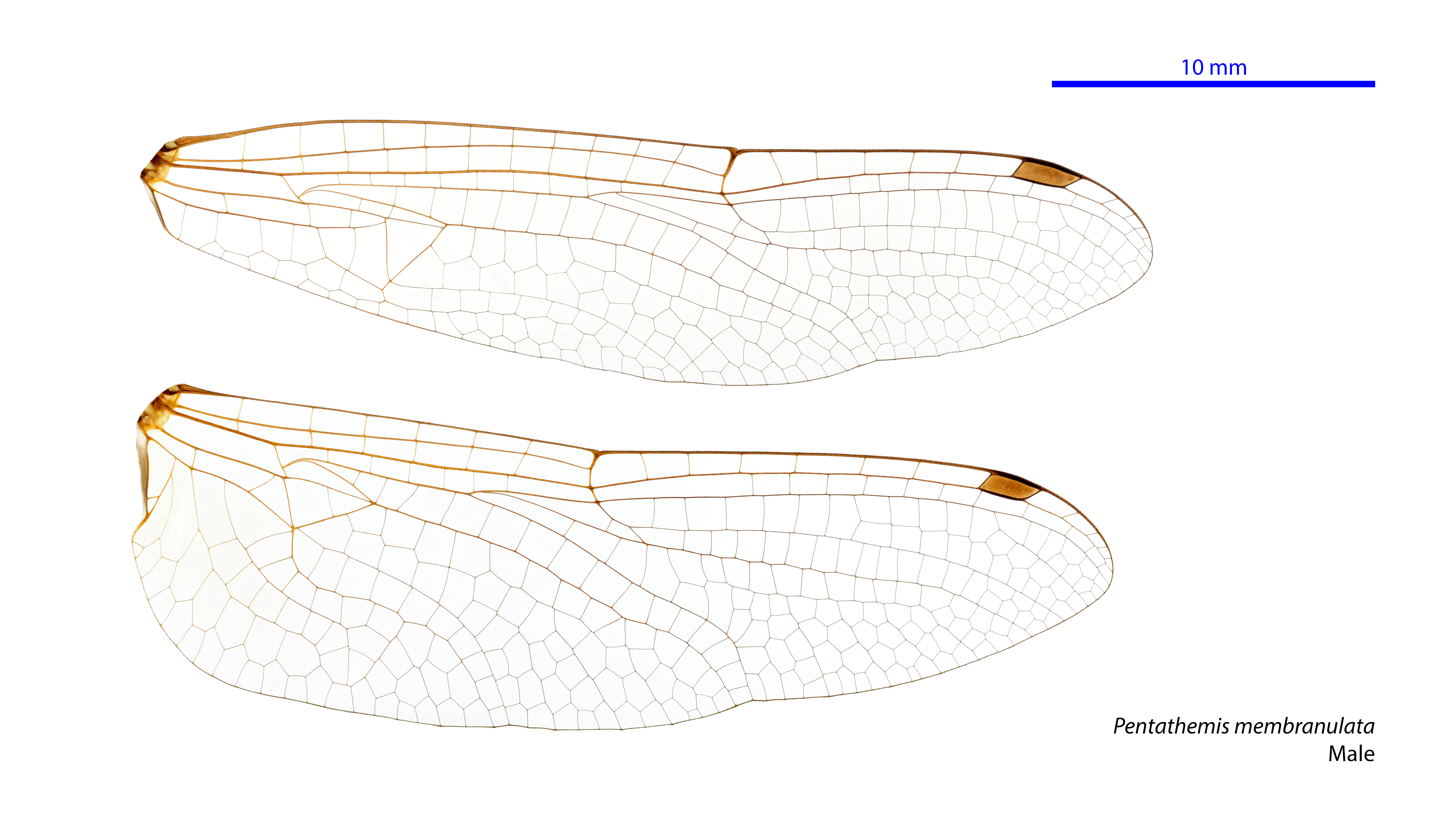
Male wings

== See also ==
- List of dragonflies of Australia
