= Libellulosoma =

Conservation status
- Data Deficient (IUCN 3.1)

Scientific classification
- Kingdom: Animalia
- Phylum: Arthropoda
- Clade: Pancrustacea
- Class: Insecta
- Order: Odonata
- Infraorder: Anisoptera
- Superfamily: Libelluloidea
- Family: Aeschnosomatidae
- Genus: Libellulosoma; Martin, 1907
- Species: L. minutum

Binomial name
- Libellulosoma minutum Martin, 1907
- Distribution of Libellulosoma minutum on Madagascar

Genus of dragonflies

Libellulosoma is a genus of dragonfly in the family Aeschnosomatidae, endemic to Madagascar. The genus is closely related to the genera, Pentathemis, Schizocordulia and Aeschnosoma found in northern Australia and tropical South America. The only known species is Libellulosoma minutum.

In 2016, Libellulosoma minutum was identified in south-eastern Madagascar in forest fragments around the Sainte Luce Reserve after 109 years without detection.
