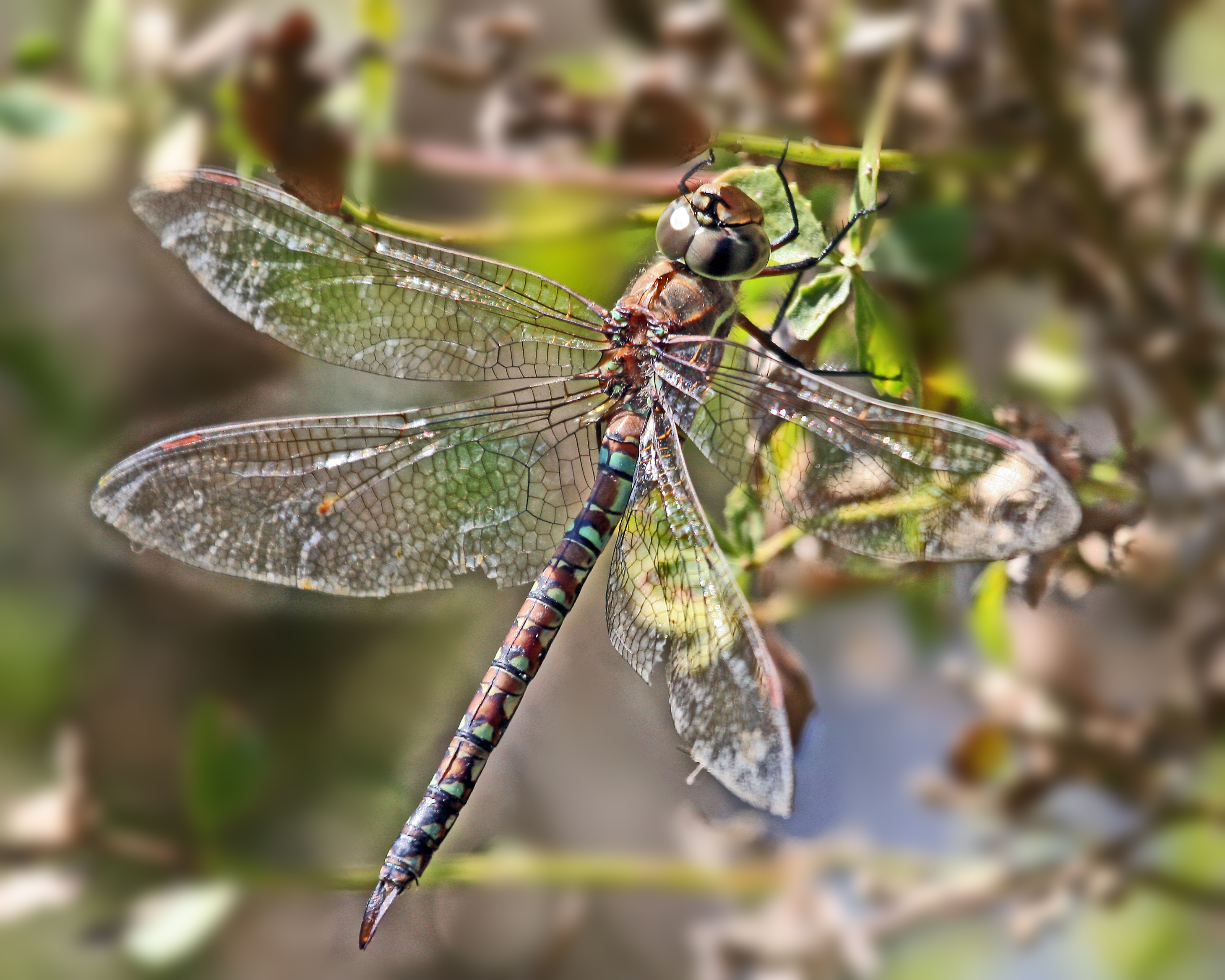

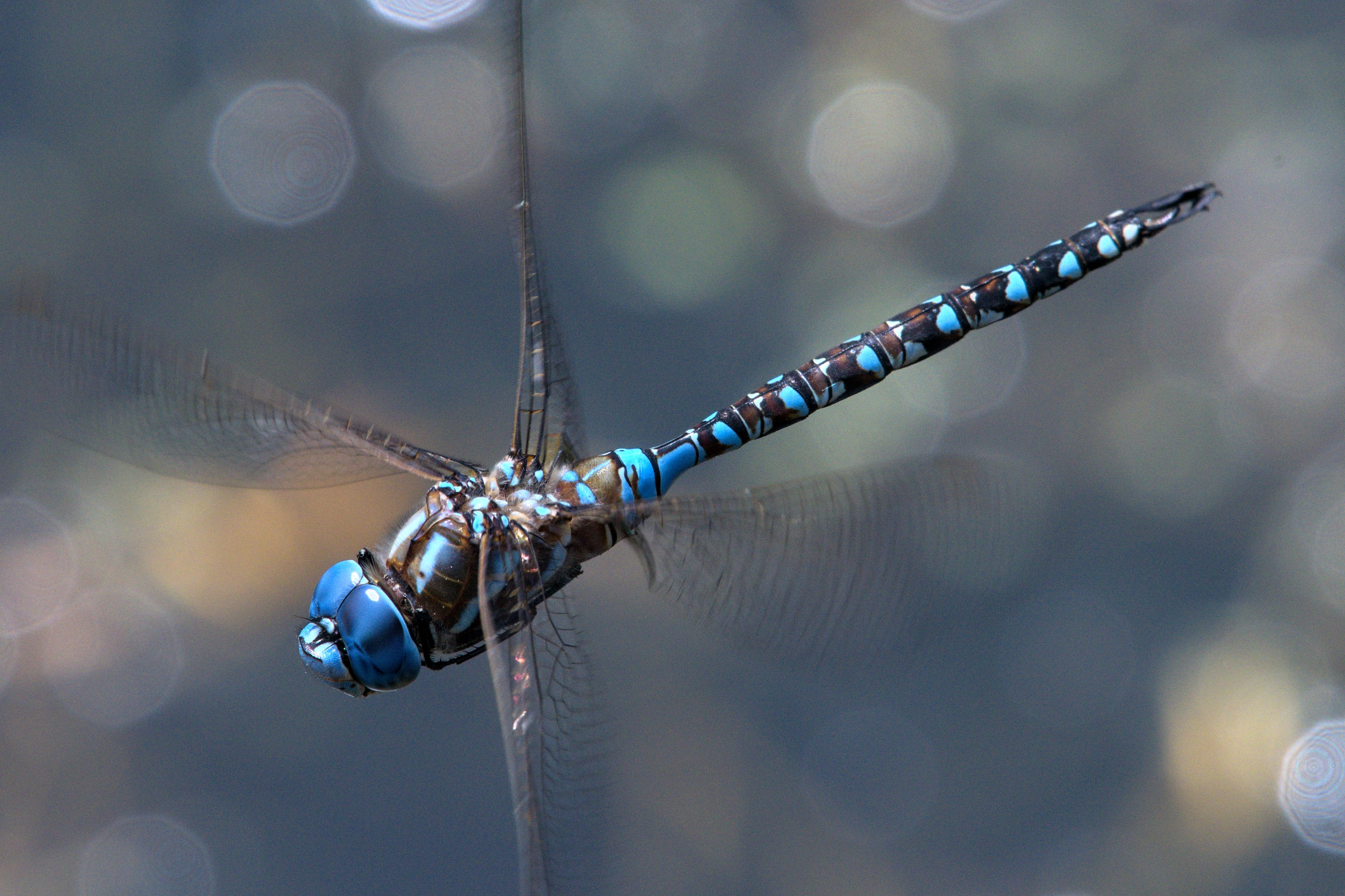

Conservation status
- Least Concern (IUCN 3.1)

Scientific classification
- Kingdom: Animalia
- Phylum: Arthropoda
- Class: Insecta
- Order: Odonata
- Infraorder: Anisoptera
- Family: Aeshnidae
- Genus: Rhionaeschna
- Species: R. multicolor

Binomial name
- Rhionaeschna multicolor Hagen, 1861

= Blue-eyed darner =

Species of dragonfly

The blue-eyed darner (Rhionaeschna multicolor, syn. Aeshna multicolor) is a common dragonfly of the family Aeshnidae; native to the western United States, it is commonly sighted in the sagebrush steppe of the Snake River Plain, occurring east to the Midwest from central Canada and the Dakotas south to west Texas and Oklahoma. In Central America it occurs south to Panama. This is usually the second earliest darner to emerge in the spring, with the California darner emerging first. It hunts small flying insects while on the wing.

== Adults ==
The blue-eyed darner is a large species with a length of 65–70 mm (2.6–2.8 in). The eyes of both males and females are bright blue. The male is dark brown to brownish black. The top of the thorax, behind the head, is marked with two blue stripes, and each side of the thorax is marked with a pair of blue diagonal stripes. The abdomen is marked with both large and small blue spots. The anal appendages of males and females are forked and the female is marked similarly to the male; however, the base color is brown and the markings are green.

== Distribution and habitat ==
The blue-eyed darner occurs in western North America and in Central America as far south as Panama, at both low and moderate altitudes. It occurs near a variety of water bodies, lakes, ponds, slow-moving streams, canals and marshy areas, especially in open rather than wooded areas. When not breeding, it is more likely than most dragonflies to be seen far away from water, in city yards, parking lots and other urban locations. It is on the wing from spring to late in the year and may be migratory in California, as a large number of them seem to appear in the fall.

== Behavior ==
Males patrol at about waist height over open water, along the margins of water bodies and among dense vegetation, often having a regular "beat", and occasionally pausing briefly to hover. Copulating couples spend some time finding a suitable location in which to perch, often high in waterside trees. Females lay eggs among dense emergent water plants, and on floating stems and branches in open water, depositing the eggs both above and below the surface.
