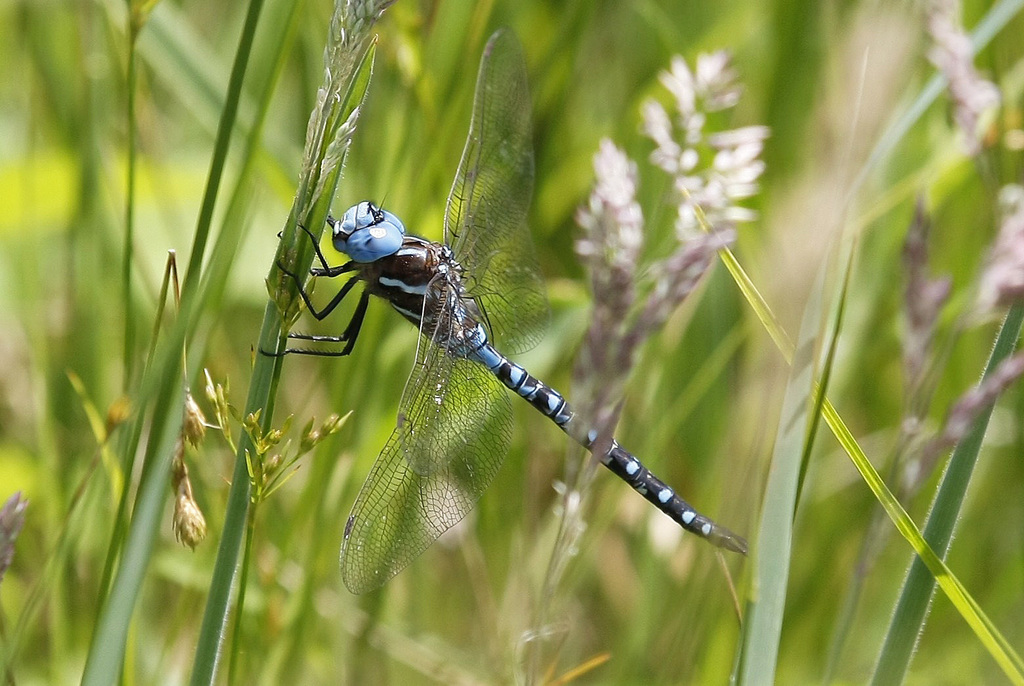

Conservation status
- Least Concern (IUCN 3.1)

Scientific classification
- Kingdom: Animalia
- Phylum: Arthropoda
- Class: Insecta
- Order: Odonata
- Infraorder: Anisoptera
- Family: Aeshnidae
- Genus: Rhionaeschna
- Species: R. mutata

Binomial name
- Rhionaeschna mutata (Hagen, 1861)

Synonyms
- Aeshna mutata Hagen, 1861

= Rhionaeschna mutata =

Species of dragonfly

Rhionaeschna mutata, the spatterdock darner, is a species of darner in the dragonfly family Aeshnidae. It is found in North America.

Spatterdock darners prefer ponds as their reproductive habitat. Specifically small, heavily vegetated, semi-permanent/ephemeral ponds that are fish-free with wooded riparian edges and sphagnum moss.

The IUCN conservation status of Rhionaeschna mutata is "LC", least concern, with no immediate threat to the species' survival. The population is stable. The IUCN status was reviewed in 2017.
