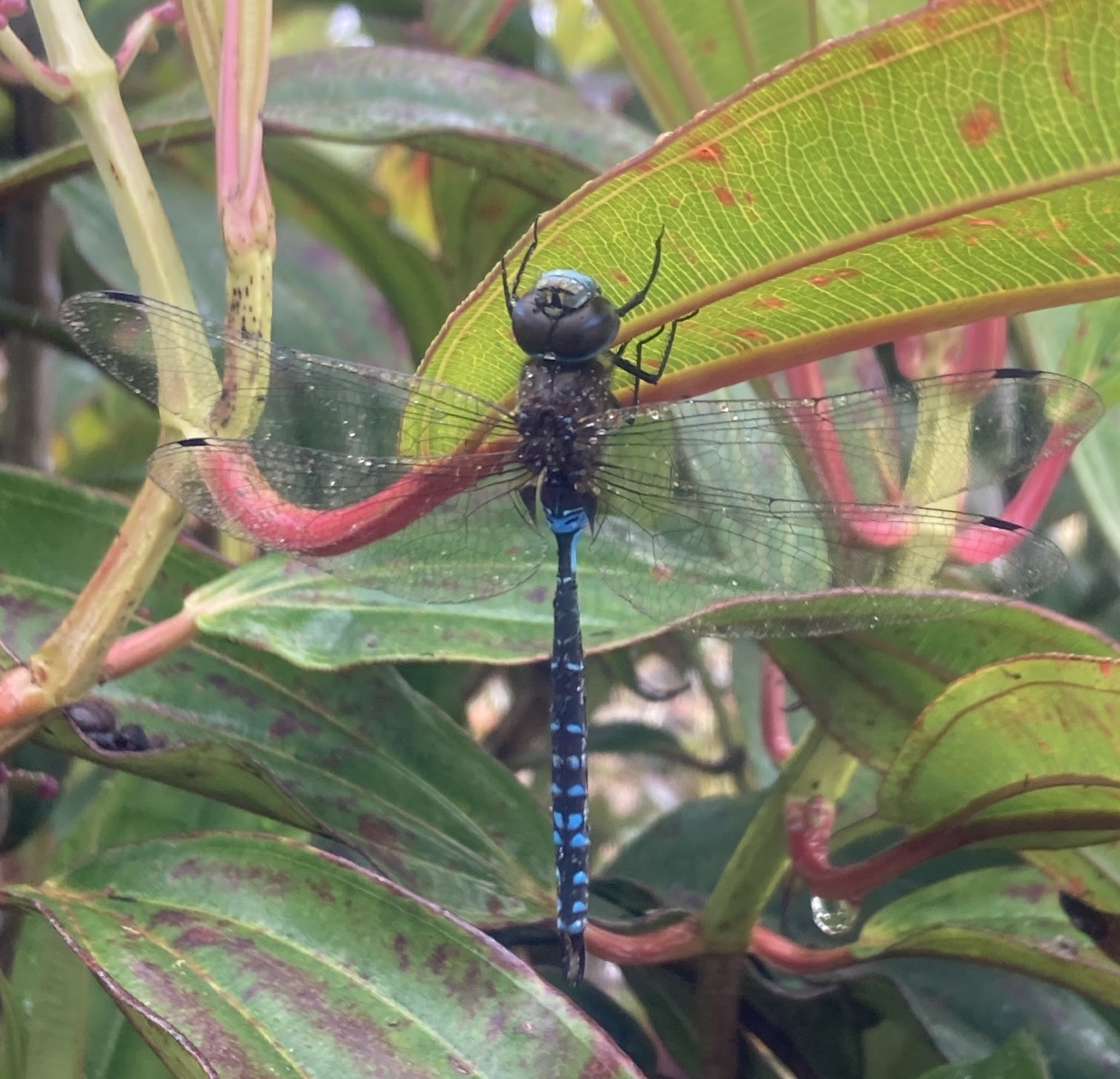

Conservation status
- Endangered (IUCN 3.1)

Scientific classification
- Kingdom: Animalia
- Phylum: Arthropoda
- Class: Insecta
- Order: Odonata
- Infraorder: Anisoptera
- Family: Aeshnidae
- Genus: Rhionaeschna
- Species: R. galapagoensis

Binomial name
- Rhionaeschna galapagoensis (Currie, 1901)

= Rhionaeschna galapagoensis =

Species of dragonfly

Rhionaeschna galapagoensis is a species of dragonfly in the genus Rhionaeschna. It is endemic to the Galápagos Islands.
