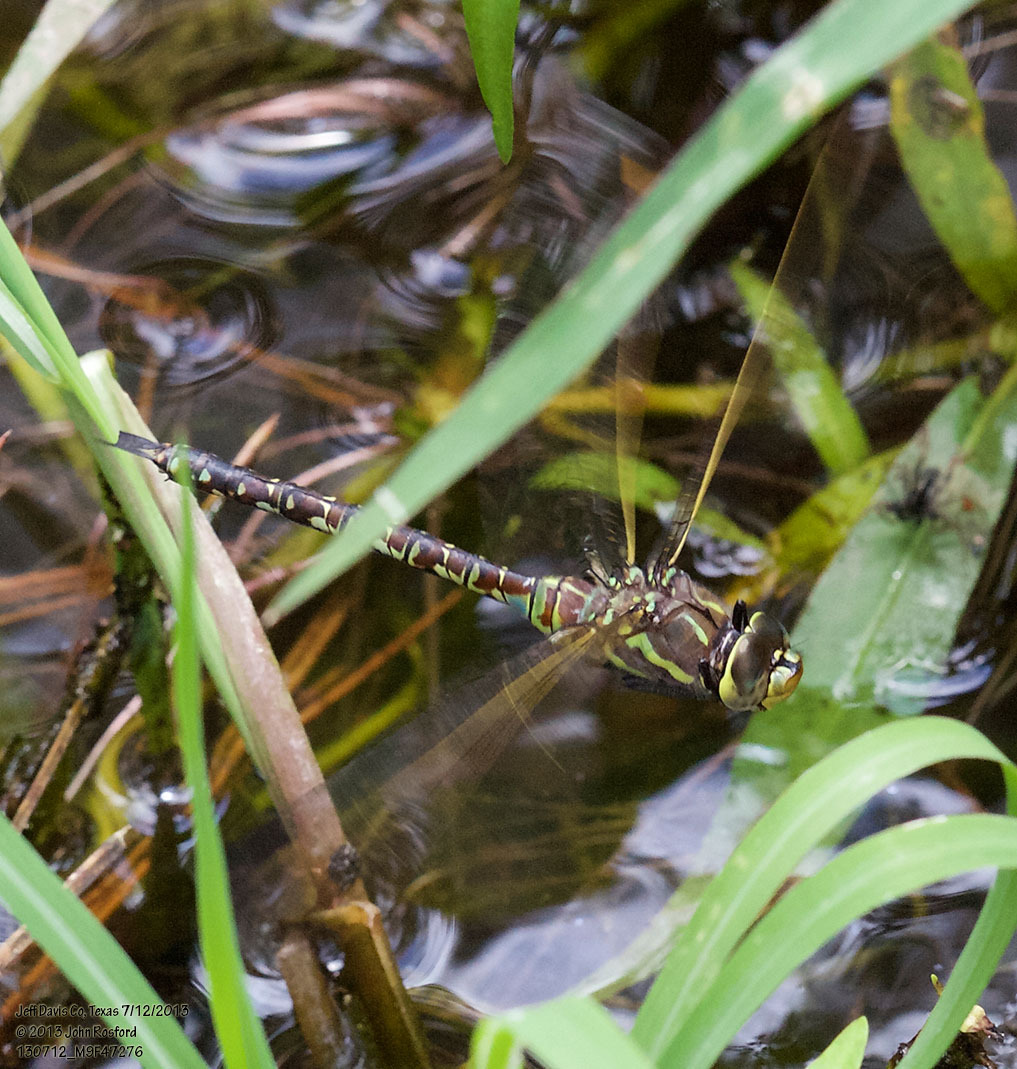
- female

Conservation status
- Least Concern (IUCN 3.1)

Scientific classification
- Kingdom: Animalia
- Phylum: Arthropoda
- Class: Insecta
- Order: Odonata
- Infraorder: Anisoptera
- Family: Aeshnidae
- Genus: Rhionaeschna
- Species: R. dugesi

Binomial name
- Rhionaeschna dugesi (Calvert, 1905)

Synonyms
- Aeshna dugesi Calvert, 1905

= Rhionaeschna dugesi =

Species of dragonfly

Rhionaeschna dugesi, the arroyo darner, is a species of darner in the dragonfly family Aeshnidae. It is found in Central America and North America.

The IUCN conservation status of Rhionaeschna dugesi is "LC", least concern, with no immediate threat to the species' survival. The population is stable. The IUCN status was reviewed in 2017.
