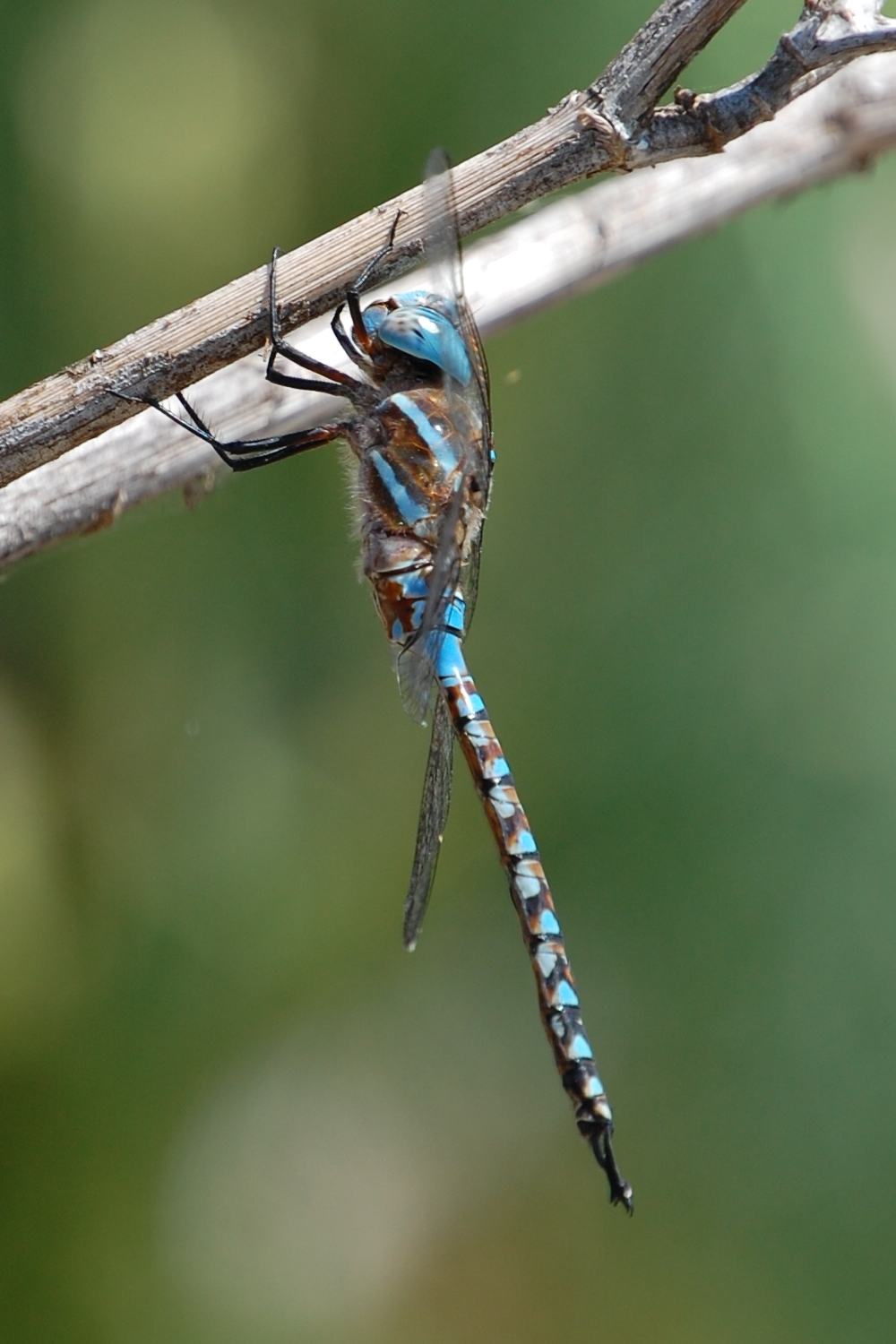
- R. multicolor

Scientific classification
- Kingdom: Animalia
- Phylum: Arthropoda
- Class: Insecta
- Order: Odonata
- Infraorder: Anisoptera
- Family: Aeshnidae
- Genus: Rhionaeschna; Förster, 1909

= Rhionaeschna =

Genus of dragonflies

Rhionaeschna is the scientific name of a genus of dragonflies from the family Aeshnidae. They are also known as blue-eyed darners and are mostly found in the Americas.

== Species ==
The genus includes the following species:

- Rhionaeschna absoluta (Calvert, 1952)
- Rhionaeschna biliosa (Kennedy, 1938)
- Rhionaeschna bonariensis (Rambur, 1842)
- Rhionaeschna brasiliensis (von Ellenrieder & Martins Costa, 2002)
- Rhionaeschna brevicercia (Muzón & von Ellenrieder, 2001)
- Rhionaeschna brevifrons (Hagen, 1861)
- Rhionaeschna californica (Calvert, 1895) – California darner
- Rhionaeschna condor (De Marmels, 2001)
- Rhionaeschna confusa (Rambur, 1842)
- Rhionaeschna cornigera (Brauer, 1865)
- Rhionaeschna decessus (Calvert, 1953)
- Rhionaeschna demarmelsi von Ellenrieder, 2003
- Rhionaeschna diffinis (Rambur, 1842)
- Rhionaeschna draco (Rácenis, 1958) – arroyo darner
- Rhionaeschna dugesi (Calvert, 1905)
- Rhionaeschna eduardoi (Machado, 1984)
- Rhionaeschna elsia (Calvert, 1952)
- Rhionaeschna fissifrons (Muzón & von Ellenrieder, 2001)
- Rhionaeschna galapagoensis (Currie, 1901)
- Rhionaeschna haarupi (Ris, 1908)
- Rhionaeschna intricata (Martin, 1908)
- Rhionaeschna itataia (Carvalho & Salgado, 2004)
- Rhionaeschna jalapensis (Williamson, 1908)
- Rhionaeschna joannisi (Martin, 1897)
- Rhionaeschna manni (Williamson & Williamson, 1930)
- Rhionaeschna marchali (Rambur, 1842)
- Rhionaeschna multicolor (Hagen, 1861) – blue-eyed darner
- Rhionaeschna mutata (Hagen, 1861) – spatterdock darner
- Rhionaeschna nubigena (De Marmels, 1989)
- Rhionaeschna obscura (Muzón & von Ellenrieder, 2001)
- Rhionaeschna pallipes (Fraser, 1947)
- Rhionaeschna pauloi (Machado, 1994)
- Rhionaeschna peralta (Ris, 1918)
- Rhionaeschna planaltica (Calvert, 1952)
- Rhionaeschna psilus (Calvert, 1947) – turquoise-tipped darner
- Rhionaeschna punctata (Martin, 1908)
- Rhionaeschna serrania (Carvalho & Salgado, 2004)
- Rhionaeschna tinti (von Ellenrieder, 2000)
- Rhionaeschna variegata (Fabricius, 1775)
- Rhionaeschna vazquezae (González, 1986)
- Rhionaeschna vigintipunctata (Ris, 1918)
