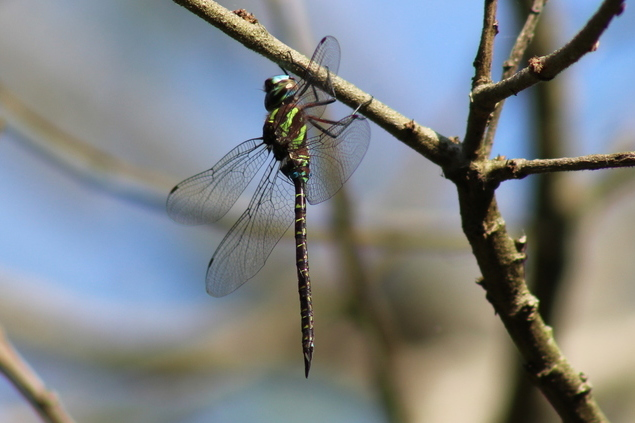

Conservation status
- Least Concern (IUCN 3.1)

Scientific classification
- Kingdom: Animalia
- Phylum: Arthropoda
- Class: Insecta
- Order: Odonata
- Infraorder: Anisoptera
- Family: Aeshnidae
- Genus: Rhionaeschna
- Species: R. psilus

Binomial name
- Rhionaeschna psilus (Calvert, 1947)

Synonyms
- Aeshna psilus Calvert, 1947

= Rhionaeschna psilus =

Species of dragonfly

Rhionaeschna psilus, the turquoise-tipped darner, is a species of darner in the family Aeshnidae. It is found in the Caribbean, Central America, North America, and South America.

The IUCN conservation status of Rhionaeschna psilus is "LC", least concern, with no immediate threat to the species' survival. The population is stable.
