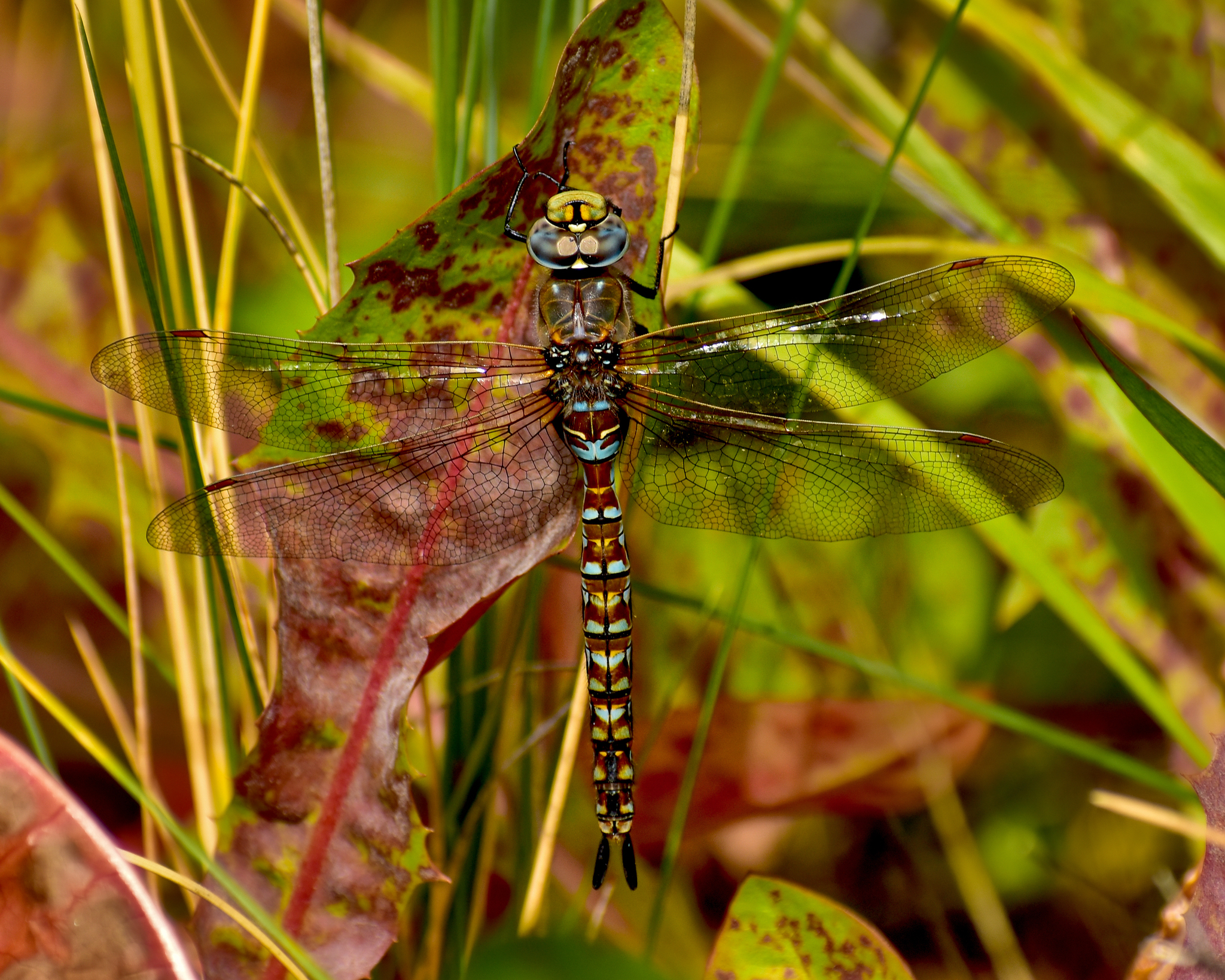

Conservation status
- Least Concern (IUCN 3.1)

Scientific classification
- Kingdom: Animalia
- Phylum: Arthropoda
- Class: Insecta
- Order: Odonata
- Infraorder: Anisoptera
- Family: Aeshnidae
- Genus: Rhionaeschna
- Species: R. variegata

Binomial name
- Rhionaeschna variegata (Fabricius, 1775)

= Rhionaeschna variegata =

Species of dragonfly

Rhionaeschna variegata is a species of dragonfly in the family Aeshnidae found in South America. It is the southernmost known species of odonate in the world and the only species found on Tierra del Fuego. It is assessed as a least-concern species on the IUCN Red List. It is found in the region of the Andes along the length of Argentina and much of Chile.
