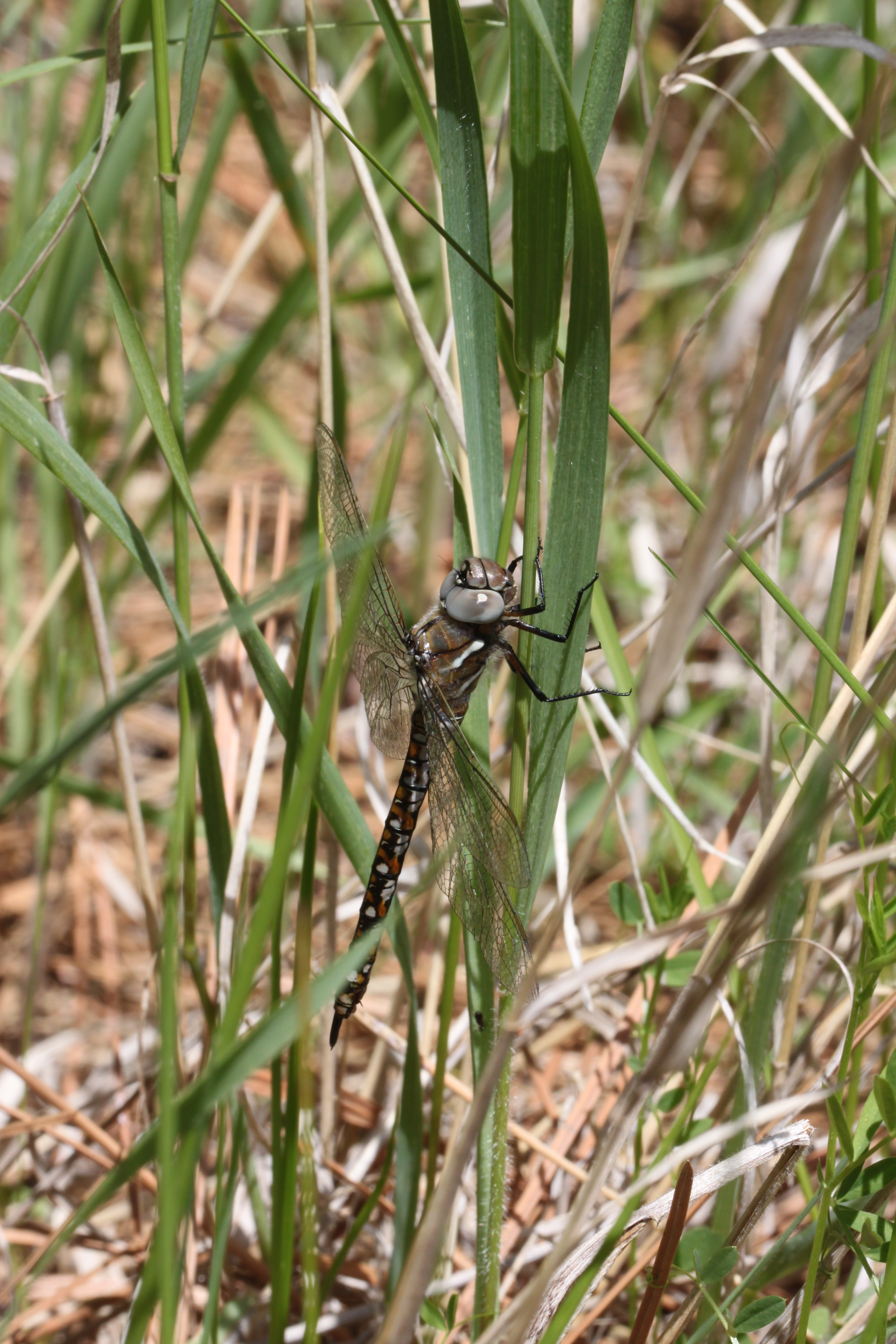

Conservation status
- Least Concern (IUCN 3.1)

Scientific classification
- Kingdom: Animalia
- Phylum: Arthropoda
- Class: Insecta
- Order: Odonata
- Infraorder: Anisoptera
- Family: Aeshnidae
- Genus: Rhionaeschna
- Species: R. californica

Binomial name
- Rhionaeschna californica (Calvert, 1895)

Synonyms
- Aeshna californica Calvert, 1895

= Rhionaeschna californica =

Species of dragonfly

Rhionaeschna californica, the California darner, is a species of darner in the dragonfly family Aeshnidae. It is commonly found in Central America, along the West Coast of the United States, and in Southwestern Canada. The California darner prefers habitats like lakes, ponds, marshes and stream pools with edge vegetation including many with alkaline water conditions Larvae sustain themselves on a diet of aquatic insects, very small fish and tadpoles. The adult-stage will eat almost any soft-bodied flying insect.

The IUCN conservation status of Rhionaeschna californica is "LC", least concern, with no immediate threat to the species' survival. The population is stable. The IUCN status was reviewed in 2017.

== Description ==
As an adult, the California darner is described as a medium-sized dragonfly, typically measuring between 5.7 and 6.4 centimetres (2 1/4 and 2 1/2 in) in length. California darners are best distinguished by their distinct bright blue diagonal spots on their abdomen.

Male California darners have a dark brown to brownish-black body with two blue or green diagonal stripes across each side of the thorax, while the top thorax is plain in color. Most females are polymorphic, although exhibit the same color scheme as males, they may also have greenish yellow markings instead of blue. Females are also heteromorphic with their eyes being light brown in comparison to the males' blue eyes.

== Distribution and habitat ==
The adult flight season occurs during the warmer months, typically occurring from mid-April to late June, which makes it one of the earliest dragonflies to appear during the spring season. In California, they are noted to have a flight season from February to August.

California darners are most commonly found throughout the Western United States, with the highest concentration stretching from Baja California to the south of Mexico. They can also be spotted in some parts of Canada, like Vancouver, and in regions of Central America.

The California darner, like many other dragonflies, thrives in aquatic environments with abundant freshwater sources. Accordingly, they gravitate toward freshwater bodies such as lakes, ponds, and marshes at lower elevations. With regard to climate, the California darner is most commonly found in Mediterranean climates, such as California, which is semi-arid, exhibiting wet winters and dry summers.

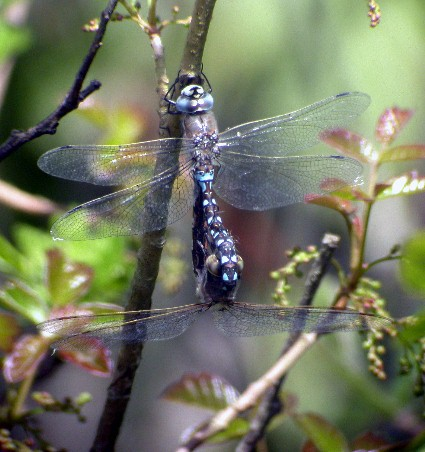
California darner, Rhionaeschna californica

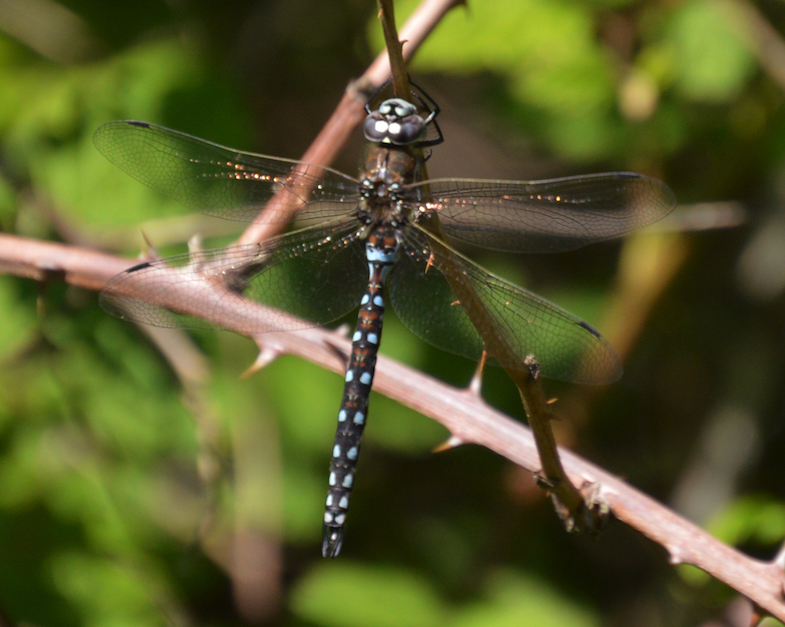
California darner, Rhionaeschna californica

== Life cycle ==
The California darner typically spends several years maturing from a naiad before transitioning into their adult dragonfly form. When this transformation occurs, it occurs at night, which is believed to be an adaptation in order to avoid being preyed upon by diurnal predators such as birds, frogs, and fish.

== Diet ==
As naiads, they primarily prey on aquatic invertebrates, such as larvae from various insects or even freshwater shrimp. However, they are not limited to just invertebrates, they will also prey on small fish and tadpoles as well.

Once they reach adulthood, the California darner typically preys on soft-bodied insects such as mosquitoes, flies, and butterflies.

== Behavior ==
Males fly along the shore, right above open water next to riparian zones, in search of female partners to mate with. California darners primarily mate at night, and they often perch near trees to begin copulating. The mating process between the pair generally lasts five to twenty minutes. Female California darners will then lay their eggs on top of vegetation at water level, such as vertical stems or even floating leaves.
