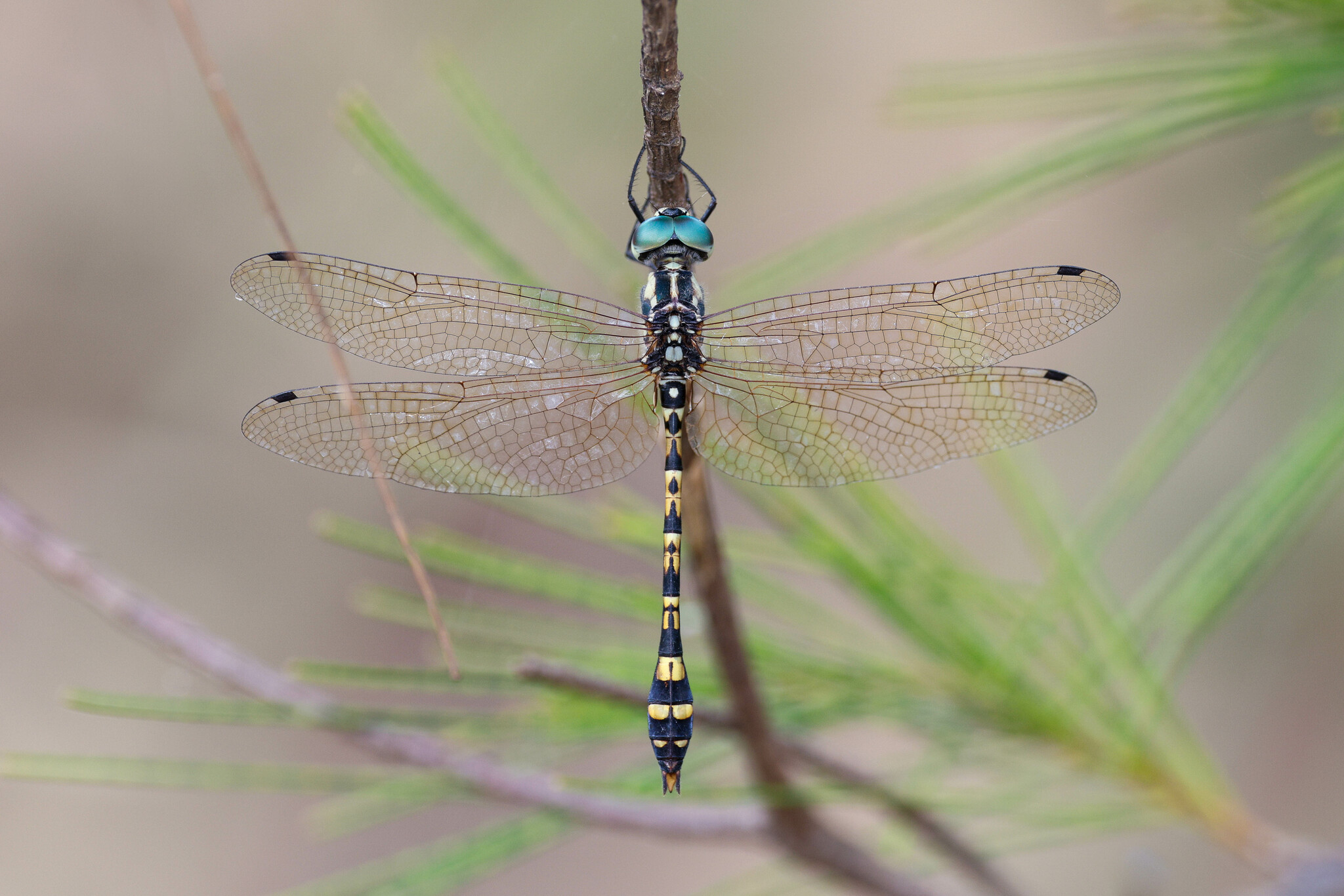
- Pentathemis membranulata

Scientific classification
- Kingdom: Animalia
- Phylum: Arthropoda
- Clade: Pancrustacea
- Class: Insecta
- Order: Odonata
- Suborder: Anisoptera
- Superfamily: Libelluloidea
- Family: Aeschnosomatidae
- Genus: Pentathemis; Karsch, 1890

Species
- Pentathemis membranulata
- Distribution of Pentathemis

= Pentathemis =

Genus of dragonflies

Pentathemis is a genus of dragonfly in the family Aeschnosomatidae. Pentathemis membranulata is the only known species of this genus, which is found in northern Australia.

== Species ==
The genus contains only one species:

- Pentathemis membranulata Karsch, 1890

== Taxonomic history ==
In 1890, Karsch established Pentathemis as a new genus based on a female specimen of Pentathemis membranulata collected in northern Australia. Karsch regarded the species as highly unusual because of its wing venation. He noted that the venation combined features seen in several libelluloid groups, making the systematic placement of the genus uncertain.

Karsch distinguished the genus by the shape of the forewing triangle, which he described as five-sided and divided by a crossvein. He also noted the large membranule at the base of the hindwing, a feature reflected in the species name membranulata.

Later examination of additional specimens showed that the original female specimen described by Karsch was aberrant, and that the forewing triangle is normally three-sided.

The genus has historically been placed in classifications of the families Corduliidae and Synthemistidae, but is currently classified in the family Aeschnosomatidae.

== Etymology ==
The genus name Pentathemis is derived from the Greek πέντα (penta, "five") and -themis, from Greek Θέμις (Themis), the goddess of divine law, order and justice. In early odonate taxonomy, names ending in -themis were introduced by Hermann August Hagen and were widely used for dragonflies. The name refers to the five-sided triangle in the forewing of the original specimen, a feature later found not to be typical of the species.

== See also ==
- List of Odonata species of Australia
