= Aeschnosomatidae =

Scientific classification
- Kingdom: Animalia
- Phylum: Arthropoda
- Clade: Pancrustacea
- Class: Insecta
- Order: Odonata
- Infraorder: Anisoptera
- Superfamily: Libelluloidea
- Family: Aeschnosomatidae; Fleck, 2020

Genera
- Aeschnosoma; Libellulosoma; Pentathemis; Schizocordulia
- Distribution of Aeschnosomatidae

Family of dragonflies

Aeschnosomatidae is a family of dragonflies within the superfamily Libelluloidea. Species of Aeschnosomatidae are found in Madagascar, northern Australia and tropical South America.

== Genera ==
The following genera are currently placed in Aeschnosomatidae:

- Aeschnosoma Selys, 1871
- Libellulosoma Martin, 1907
- Pentathemis Karsch, 1890
- Schizocordulia Machado, 2005

== Taxonomic history ==
Species of Aeschnosoma, Libellulosoma, Pentathemis, and Schizocordulia had generally been assigned to the family Corduliidae and possibly Cordulephyinae. Studies through the twentieth century of wing characters and other morphological features suggested they may be related.

First morphological studies published in 2012 and 2020 with the creation of the taxa Aeschnosomata and Aeschnosomatinae, and later a molecular analysis combined with some morphological characters published in 2025, established the monophyly of the four genera. The former studies considered the Aeschnosomata/Aeschnosomatinae as sistergroup of remaining Corduliidae s.s. and the last study supported Aeschnosomatidae as a distinct group within Libelluloidea.

== Etymology ==
The family name Aeschnosomatidae is derived from the type genus Aeschnosoma, with the standard zoological suffix -idae used for animal families.
