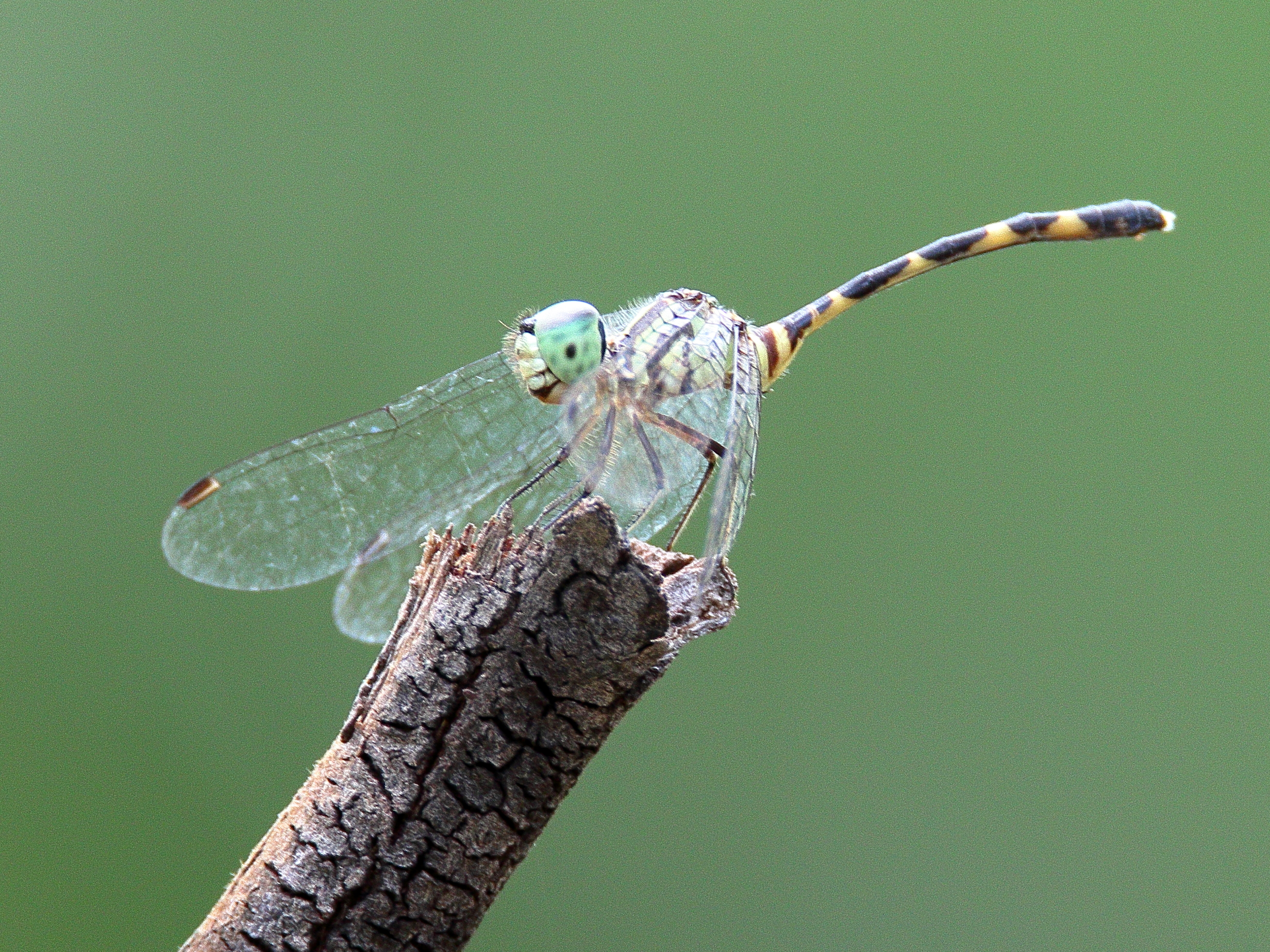
- Female, Northern Territory

Conservation status
- Least Concern (IUCN 3.1)

Scientific classification
- Kingdom: Animalia
- Phylum: Arthropoda
- Clade: Pancrustacea
- Class: Insecta
- Order: Odonata
- Suborder: Anisoptera
- Superfamily: Libelluloidea
- Family: Libellulidae
- Genus: Nannophlebia
- Species: N. mudginberri

Binomial name
- Nannophlebia mudginberri Watson & Theischinger, 1991

= Nannophlebia mudginberri =

Top End archtail

Species of dragonfly

Nannophlebia mudginberri is a species of dragonfly of the family Libellulidae, known as the Top End archtail. It inhabits streams of northern Australia. It is a small dragonfly with black and yellow markings and a slender body.

== Etymology ==
The genus name Nannophlebia is derived from the Greek νάννος (nannos, "dwarf") and φλέψ (phleps, "vein"). The name combines elements used in the existing genera Nannophya and Neophlebia.

The species name mudginberri is named for Mudginberri Station in the Northern Territory, where the original specimens of the species were collected.

== Gallery ==
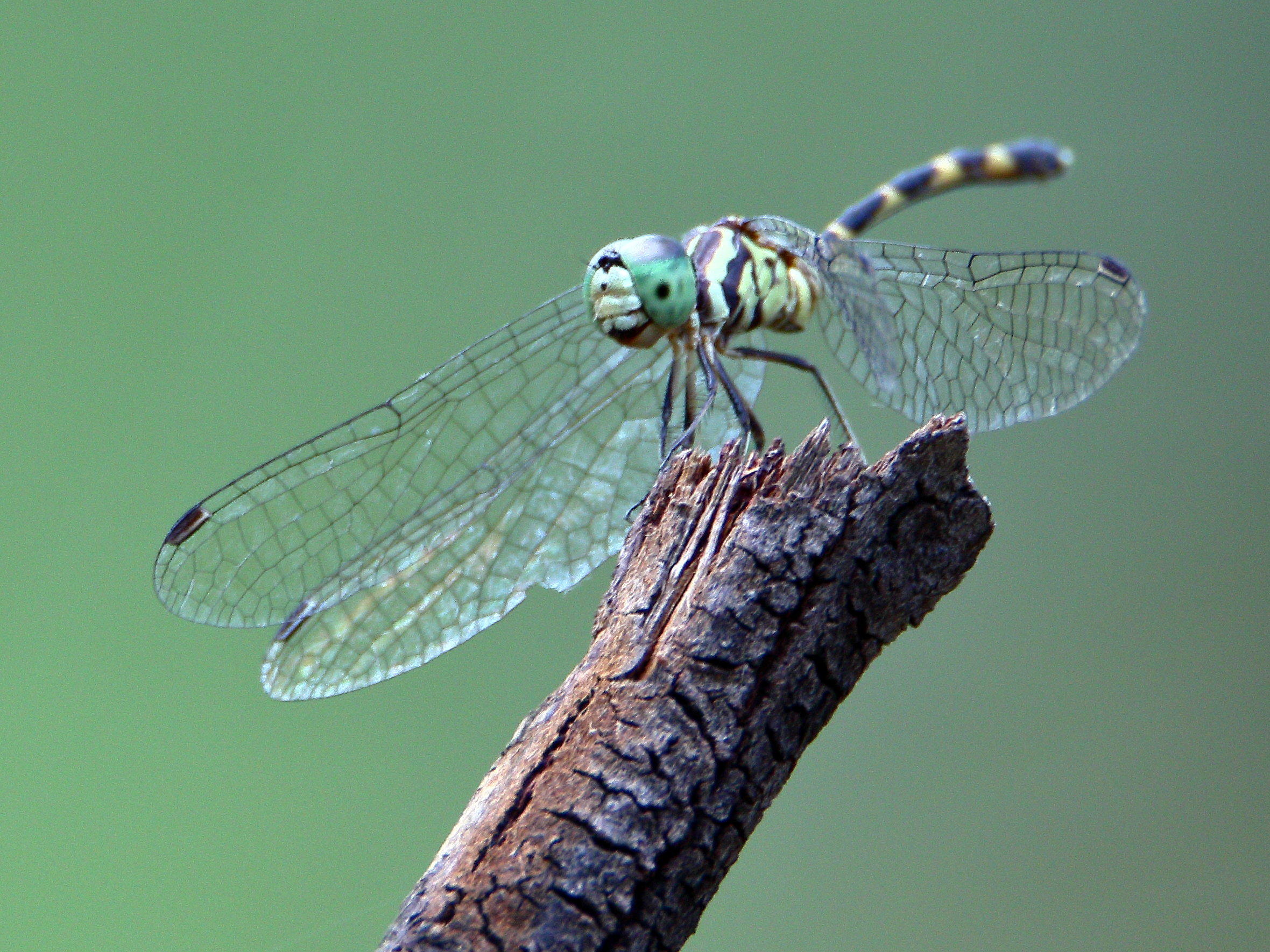
Female, alternative view

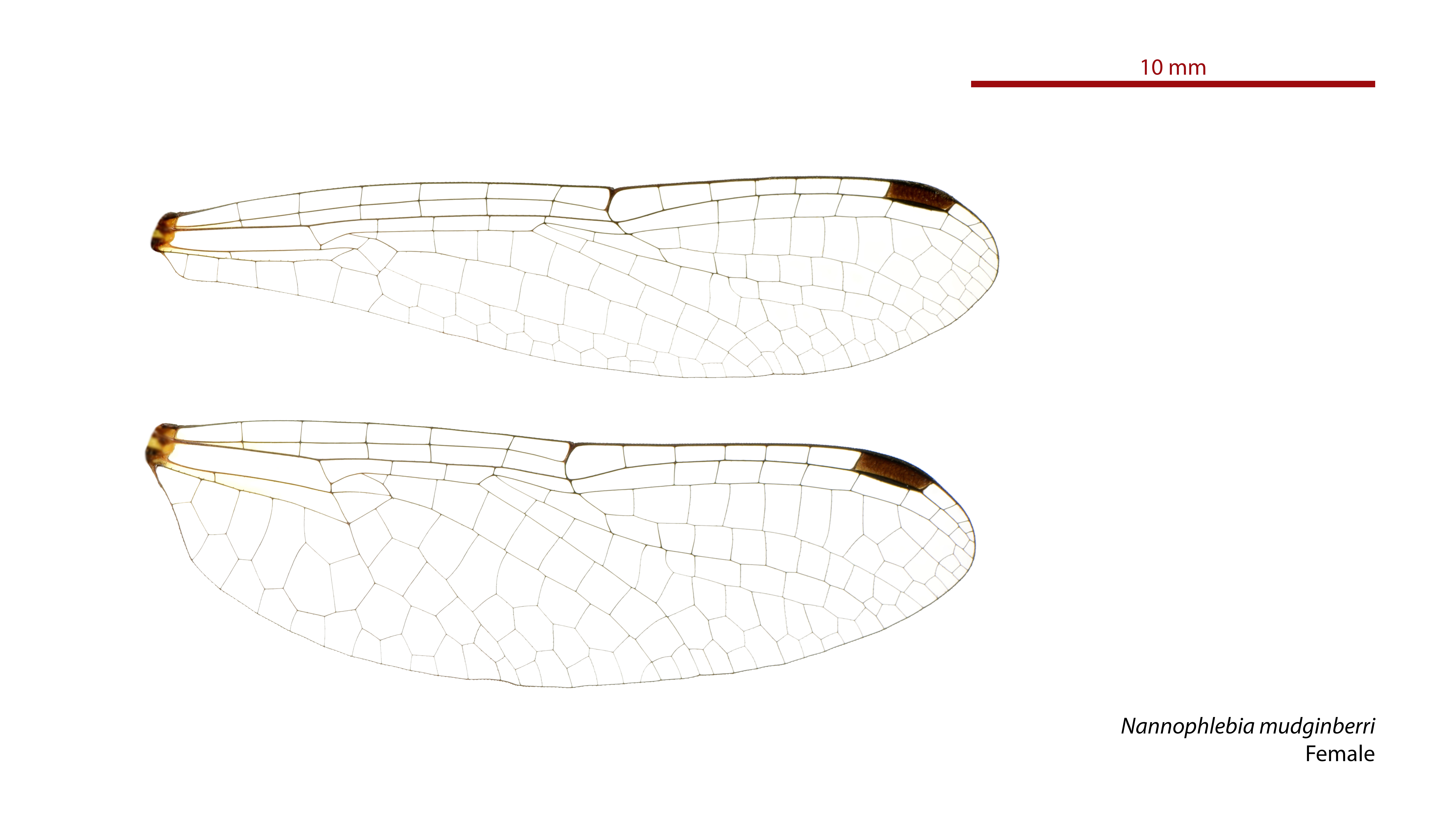
Female wings

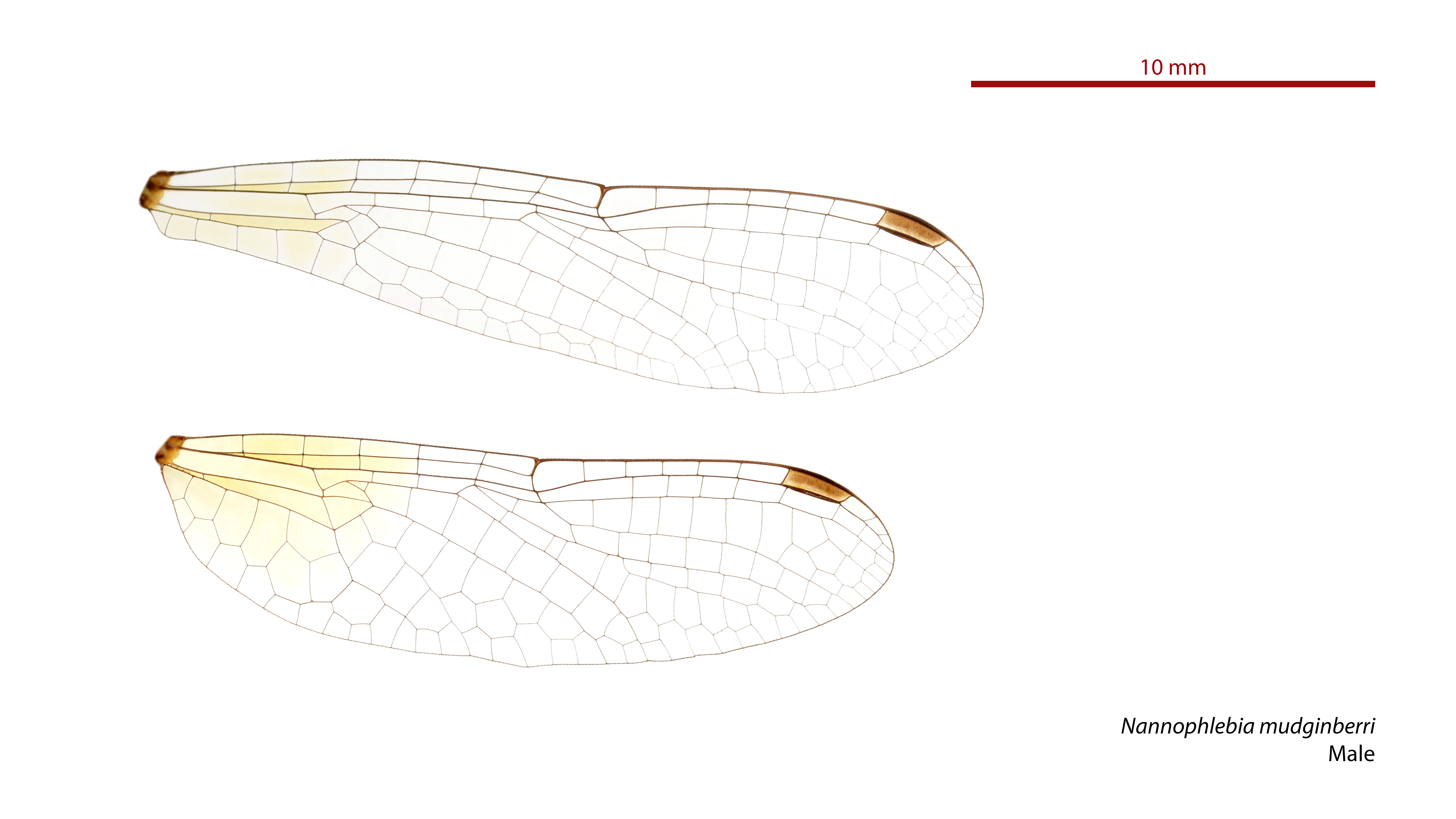
Male wings

== See also ==
- List of Odonata species of Australia
