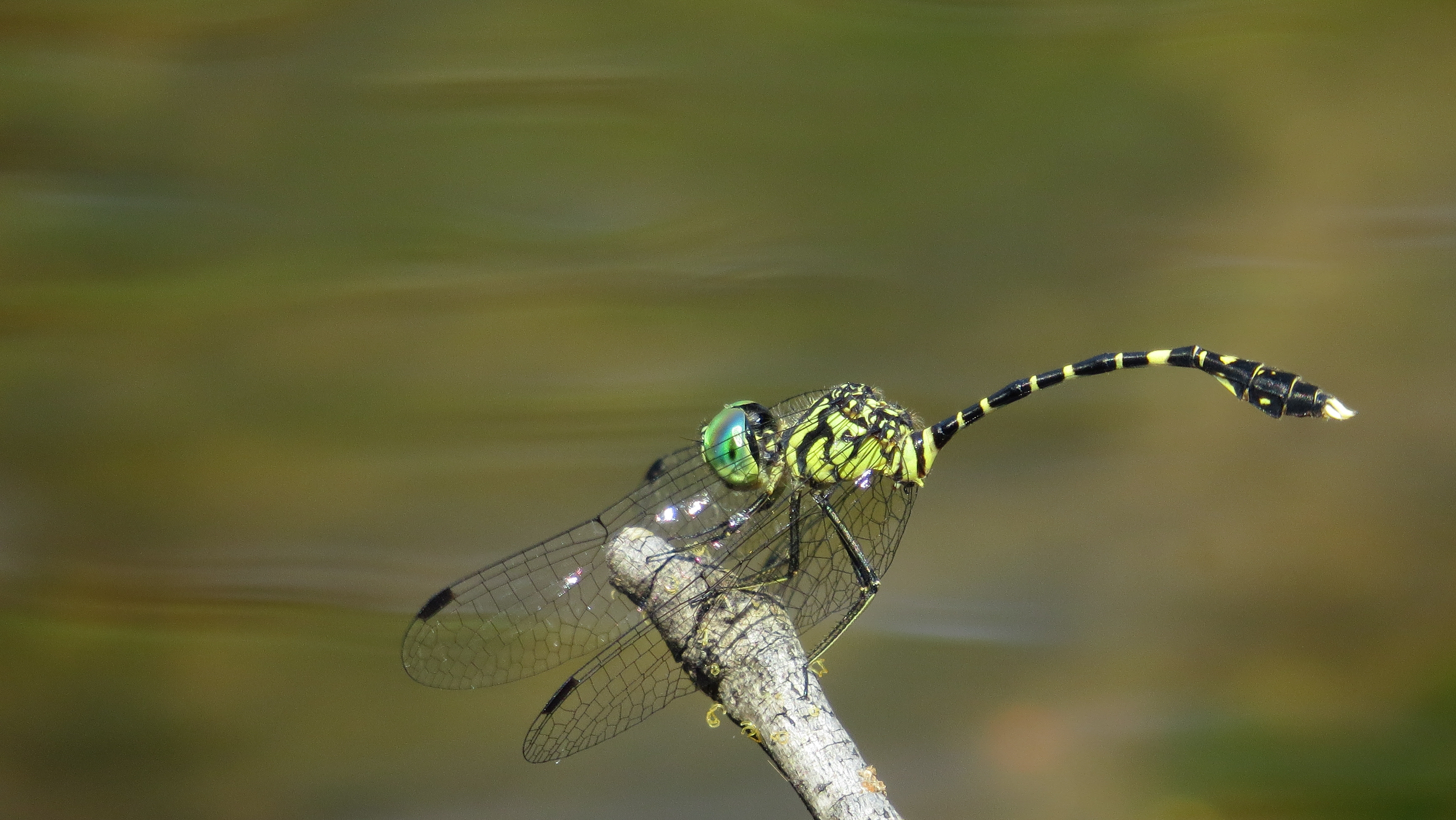
- Nannophlebia risi

Scientific classification
- Kingdom: Animalia
- Phylum: Arthropoda
- Clade: Pancrustacea
- Class: Insecta
- Order: Odonata
- Infraorder: Anisoptera
- Family: Libellulidae
- Subfamily: Tetrathemistinae
- Genus: Nannophlebia; Selys, 1878

= Nannophlebia =

Genus of dragonflies

Nannophlebia is a genus of dragonfly in the family Libellulidae. They are commonly known as Archtails. The species are very small with black and yellow striped abdomens.

== Species ==
The genus Nannophlebia includes the following species:

- Nannophlebia adonira Lieftinck, 1938
- Nannophlebia aerostiba Lieftinck, 1955
- Nannophlebia agalma Lieftinck, 1963
- Nannophlebia aglaia Lieftinck, 1948
- Nannophlebia alexia Lieftinck, 1933
- Nannophlebia amaryllis Lieftinck, 1955
- Nannophlebia amnosia Lieftinck, 1955
- Nannophlebia amphicyllis Lieftinck, 1933
- Nannophlebia ampycteria Lieftinck, 1933
- Nannophlebia anacharis Lieftinck, 1955
- Nannophlebia anatya Lieftinck, 1933
- Nannophlebia anticantha Lieftinck, 1963
- Nannophlebia arethusa Lieftinck, 1948
- Nannophlebia axiagastra Lieftinck, 1933
- Nannophlebia biroi (Förster, 1900)
- Nannophlebia braueri (Förster, 1900)
- Nannophlebia buruensis Lieftinck, 1926
- Nannophlebia eludens Tillyard, 1908 - Elusive Archtail
- Nannophlebia imitans Ris, 1900
- Nannophlebia injibandi Watson, 1969
- Nannophlebia kalkmani Theischinger & Richards, 2011
- Nannophlebia lorquinii (Selys, 1877)
- Nannophlebia mudginberri Watson & Theischinger, 1991 - Top End Archtail
- Nannophlebia risi Tillyard, 1913 - Common Archtail

== Etymology ==
The genus name Nannophlebia is derived from the Greek νάννος (nannos, "dwarf") and φλέψ (phleps, "vein"). The name combines elements used in the existing genera Nannophya and Neophlebia.
