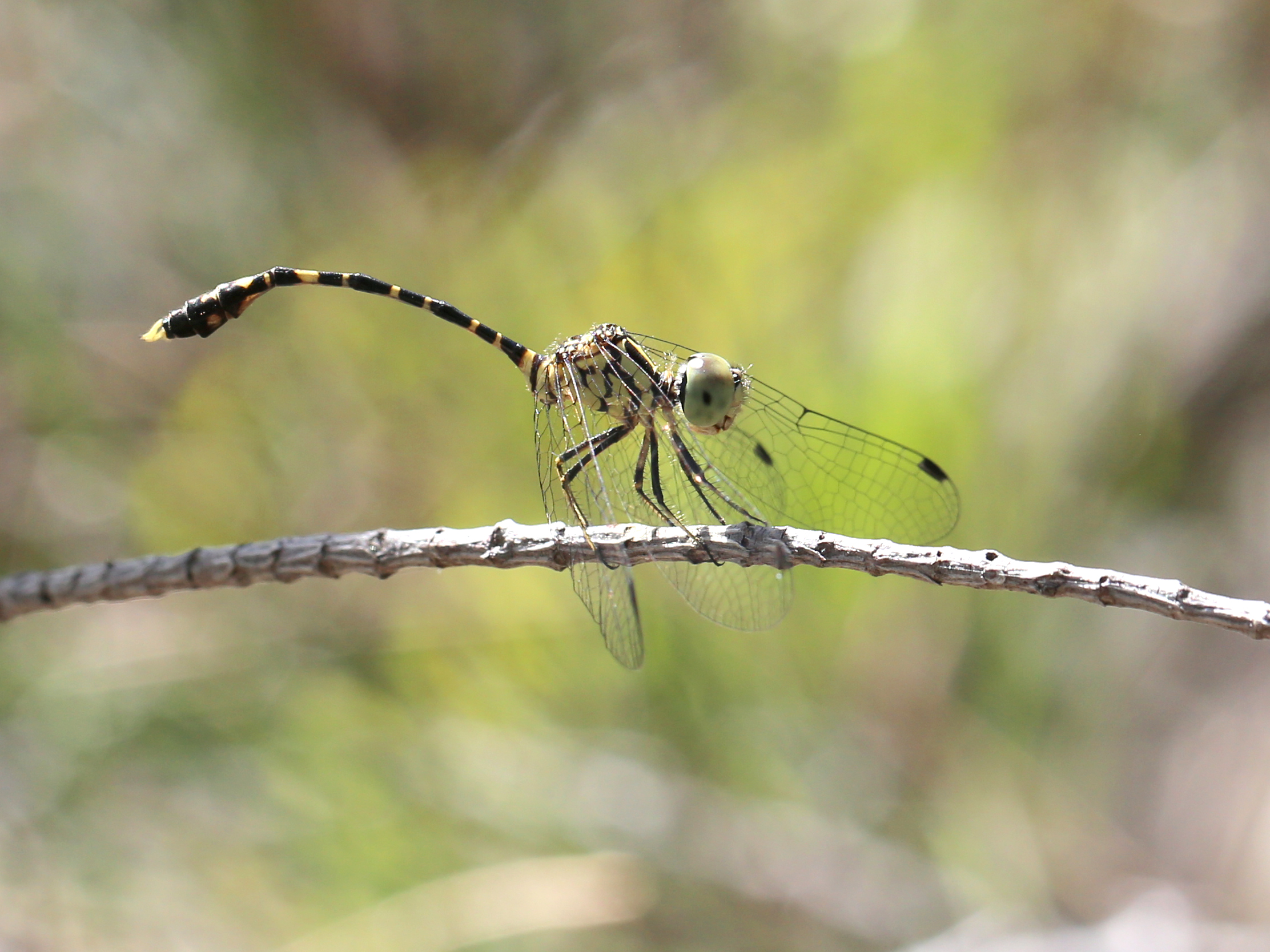
- Common Archtail

Conservation status
- Least Concern (IUCN 3.1)

Scientific classification
- Kingdom: Animalia
- Phylum: Arthropoda
- Clade: Pancrustacea
- Class: Insecta
- Order: Odonata
- Suborder: Anisoptera
- Superfamily: Libelluloidea
- Family: Libellulidae
- Genus: Nannophlebia
- Species: N. risi

Binomial name
- Nannophlebia risi Tillyard, 1913

= Nannophlebia risi =

Species of dragonfly

Nannophlebia risi, known as the common archtail, is a species of dragonfly in the family Libellulidae. It is endemic to Australia.

== Description ==
Common archtails are small dragonflies (wingspan 50-60mm, length 35-40mm) having a black abdomen marked with small yellow bands or patches. The abdomen is arched with swollen segments towards the end. The synthorax is black, marked with large yellowish or greenish patches. The wings are hyaline with brown markings on the inner third.

== Distribution ==
The reference field guide shows its distribution extends from the Northern Territory, to Queensland (except for northern Cape York), coastal New South Wales and coastal Victoria.

== Habitat ==
They inhabit streams and rivers, and the larvae are found near gravel or stones. The taxon has been assessed for the IUCN Red List as least concern.

== Etymology ==
The genus name Nannophlebia is derived from the Greek νάννος (nannos, "dwarf") and φλέψ (phleps, "vein"). The name combines elements used in the existing genera Nannophya and Neophlebia.

In 1913, Robin Tillyard named this species risi, an eponym honouring his friend, the entomologist Friedrich Ris (1867–1931).

== Gallery ==
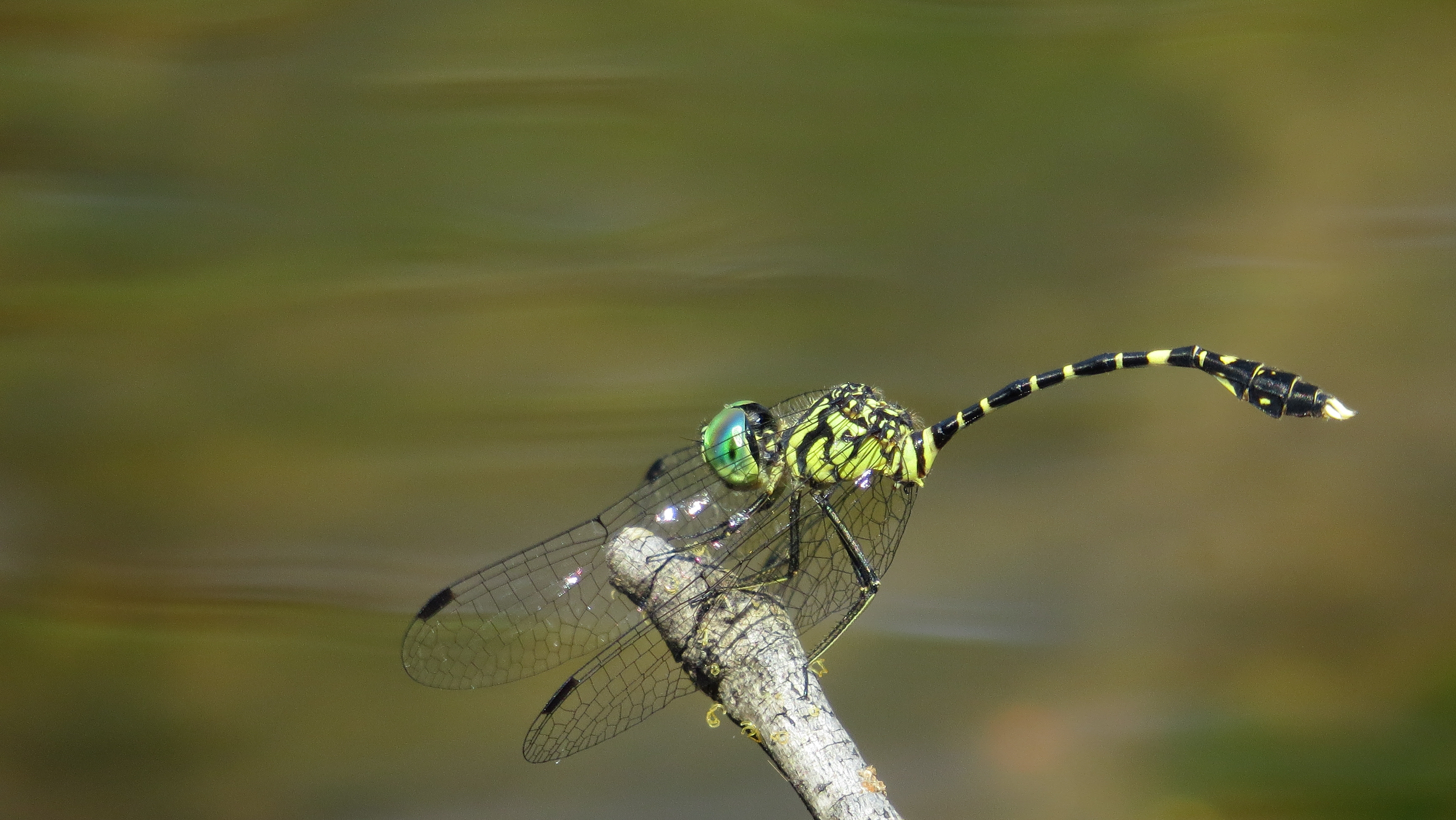
Green eyes

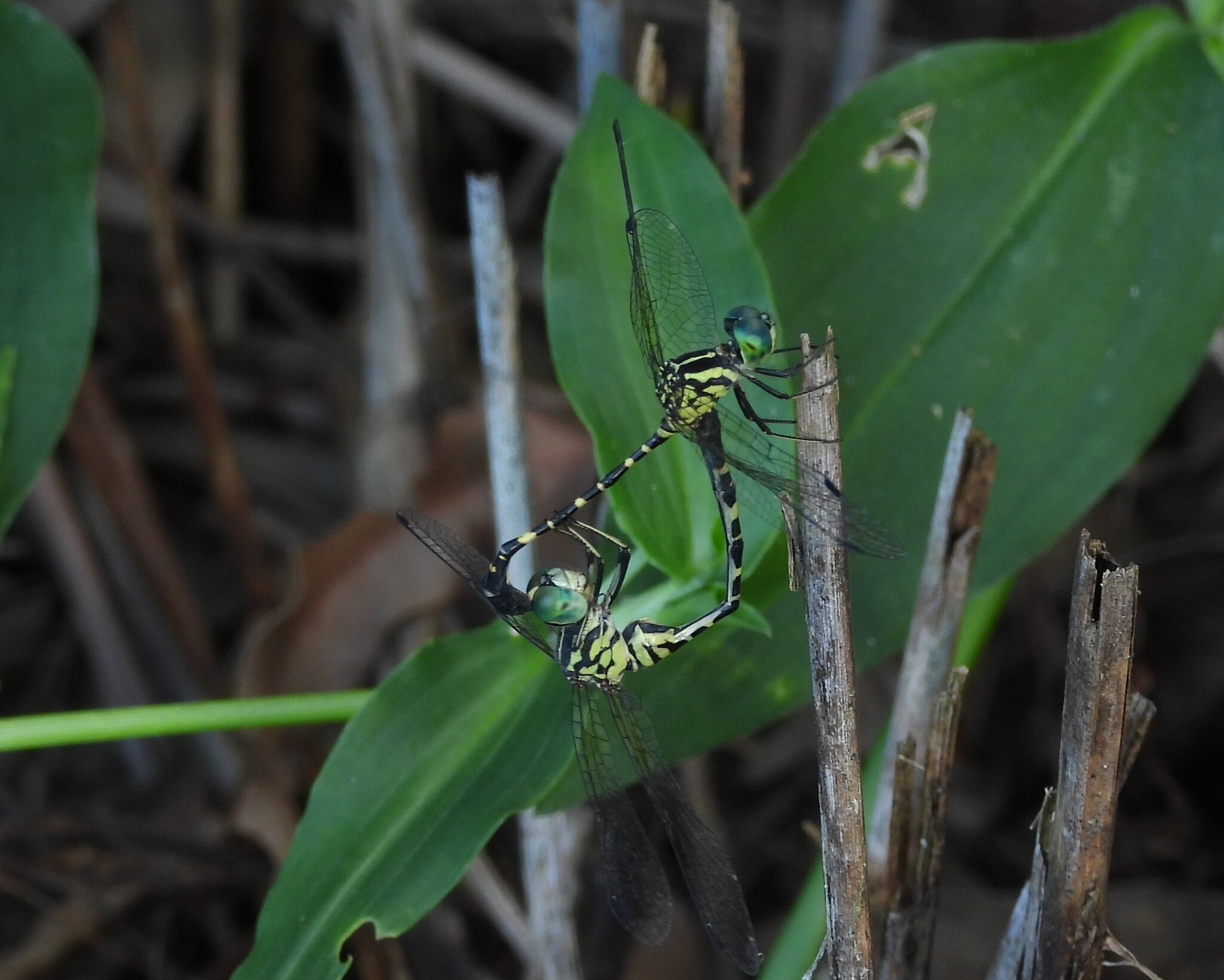
Mating pair

Diagram of Nannophlebia wings

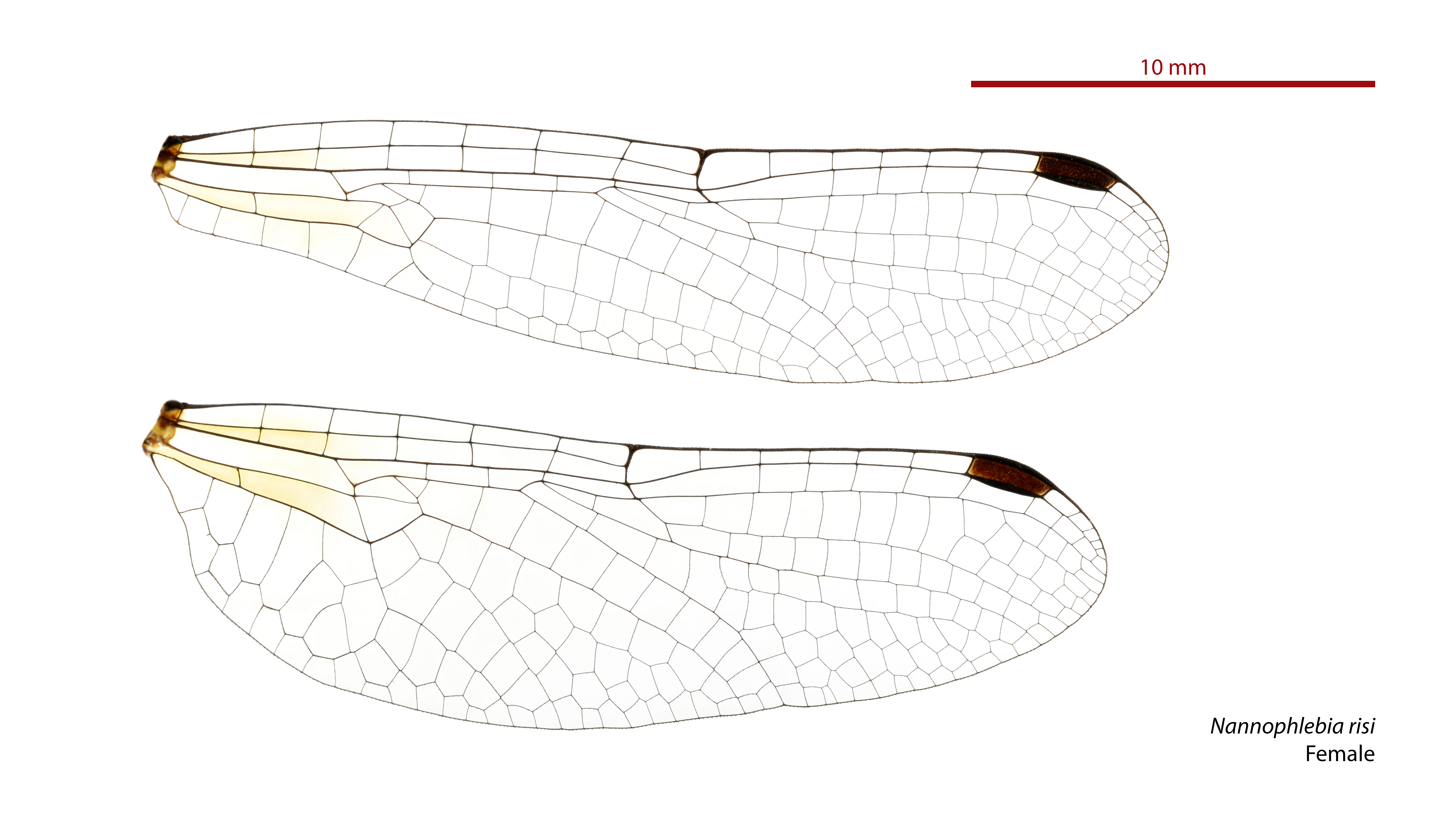
Photo of female wings

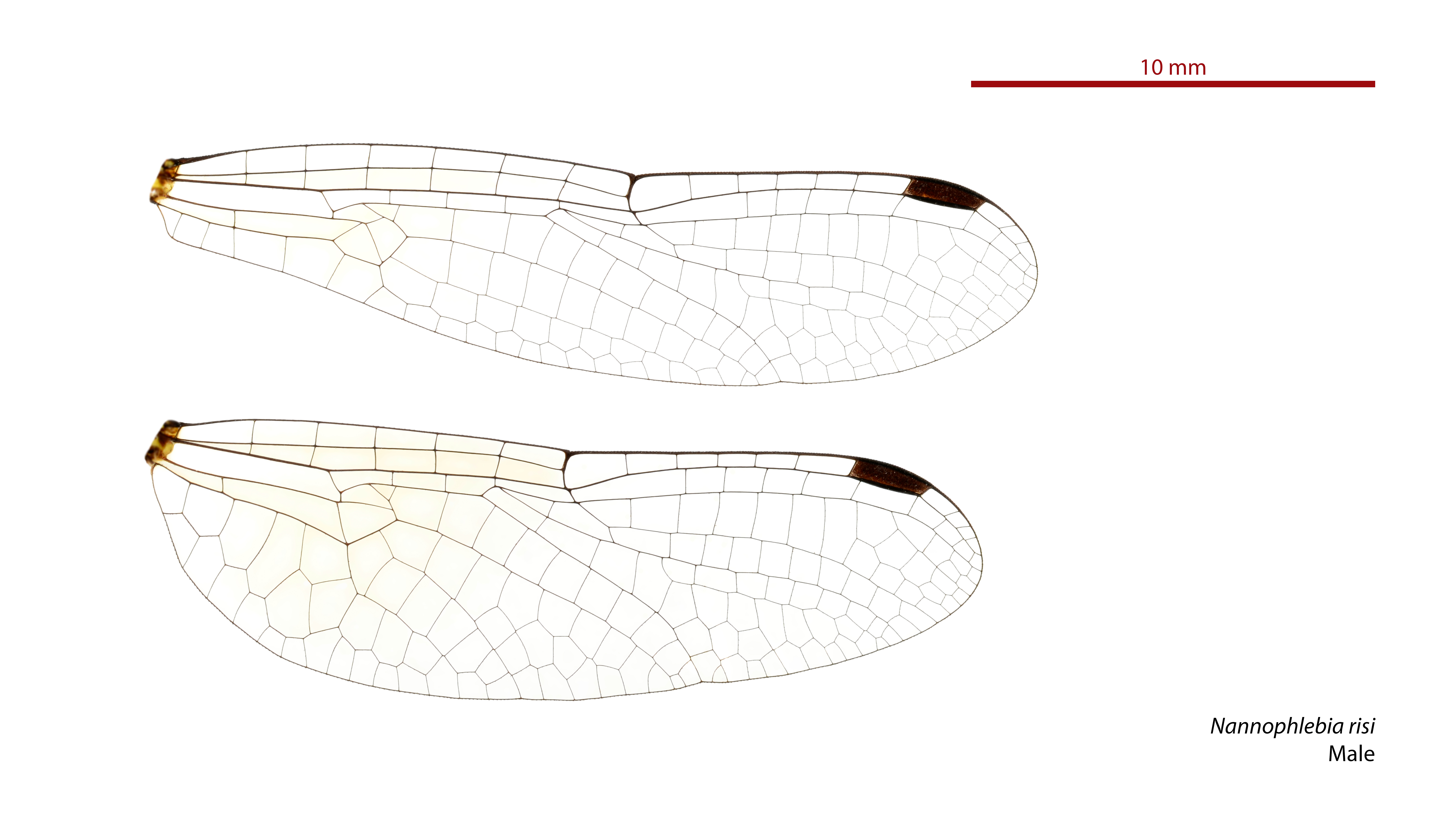
Photo of male wings

== See also ==
- List of Odonata species of Australia
