= Nannophlebia injibandi =

Pilbara archtail

Conservation status
- Least Concern (IUCN 3.1)

Scientific classification
- Kingdom: Animalia
- Phylum: Arthropoda
- Clade: Pancrustacea
- Class: Insecta
- Order: Odonata
- Suborder: Anisoptera
- Superfamily: Libelluloidea
- Family: Libellulidae
- Genus: Nannophlebia
- Species: N. injibandi

Binomial name
- Nannophlebia injibandi Watson, 1969

Species of dragonfly

Nannophlebia injibandi is a species of dragonfly of the family Libellulidae, commonly known as the Pilbara archtail. It inhabits streams and rivers of northern Australia. It is a small dragonfly with black and yellow markings and a slender body.

== Etymology ==
The genus name Nannophlebia is derived from the Greek νάννος (nannos, "dwarf") and φλέψ (phleps, "vein"). The name combines elements used in the existing genera Nannophya and Neophlebia.

The species name injibandi is named for the Indjibandi people, who formerly lived on the plateau near Millstream, where the original specimens of the species were collected.

== Gallery ==
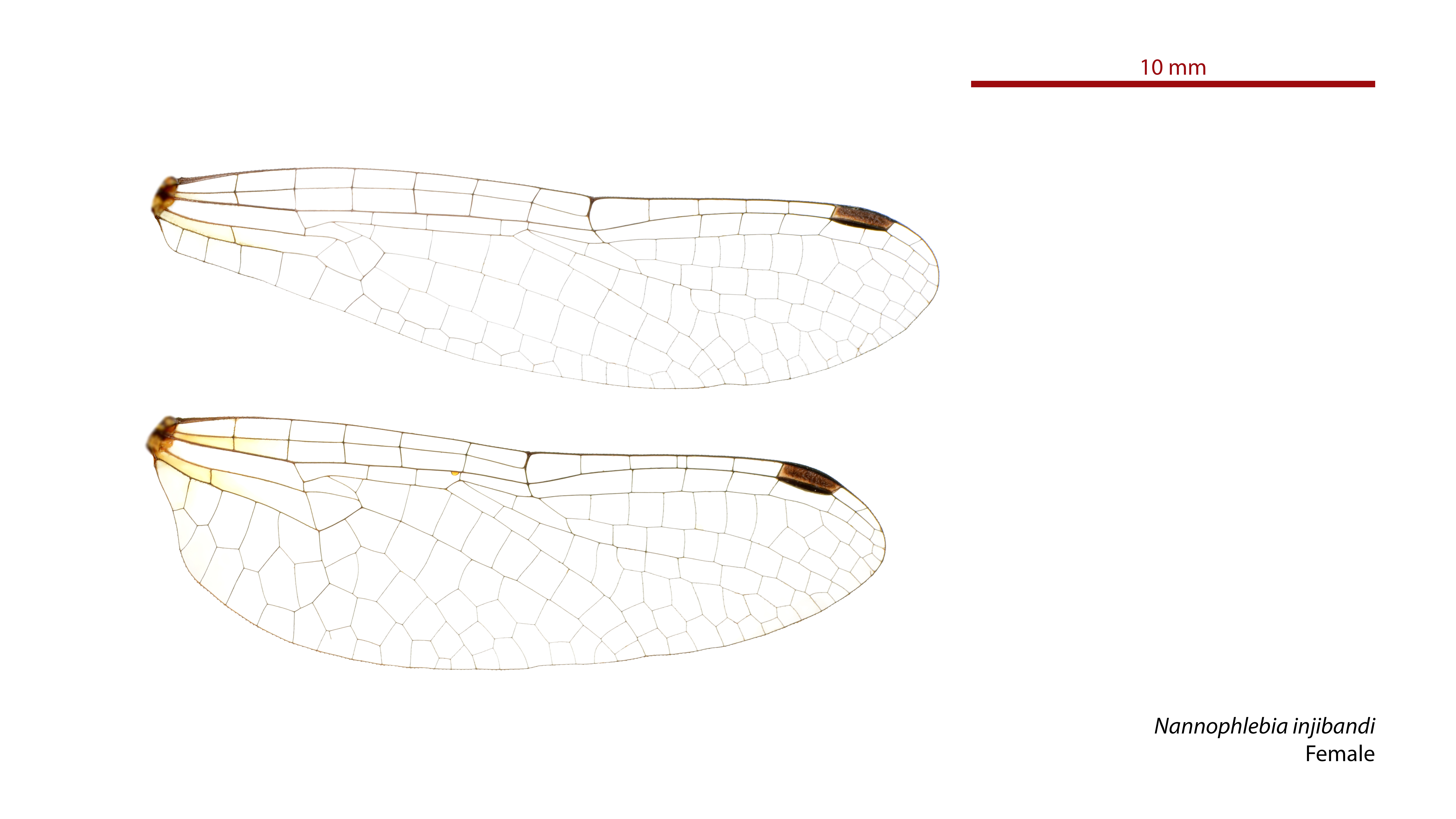
Female wings

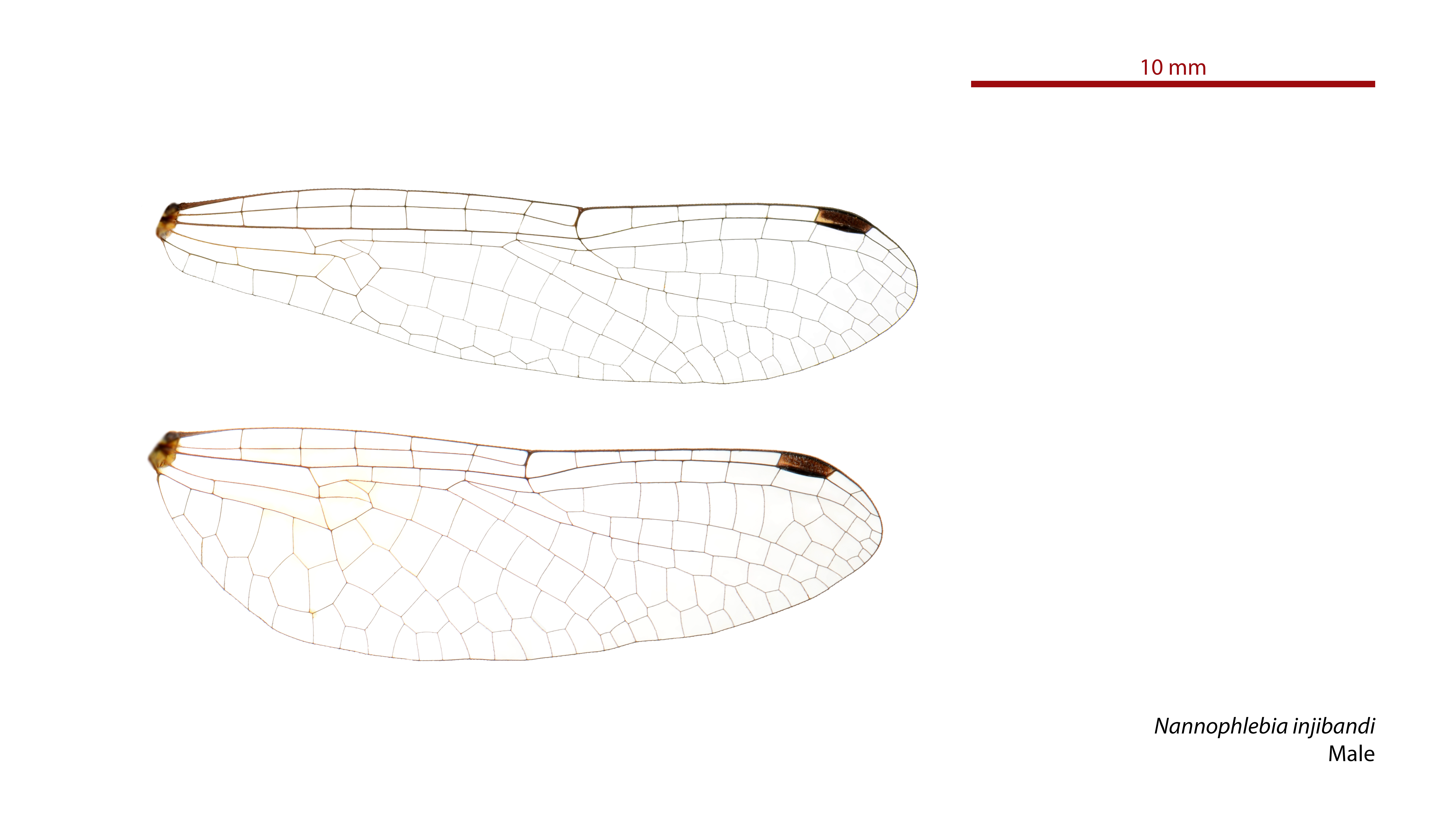
Male wings

== See also ==
- List of Odonata species of Australia
