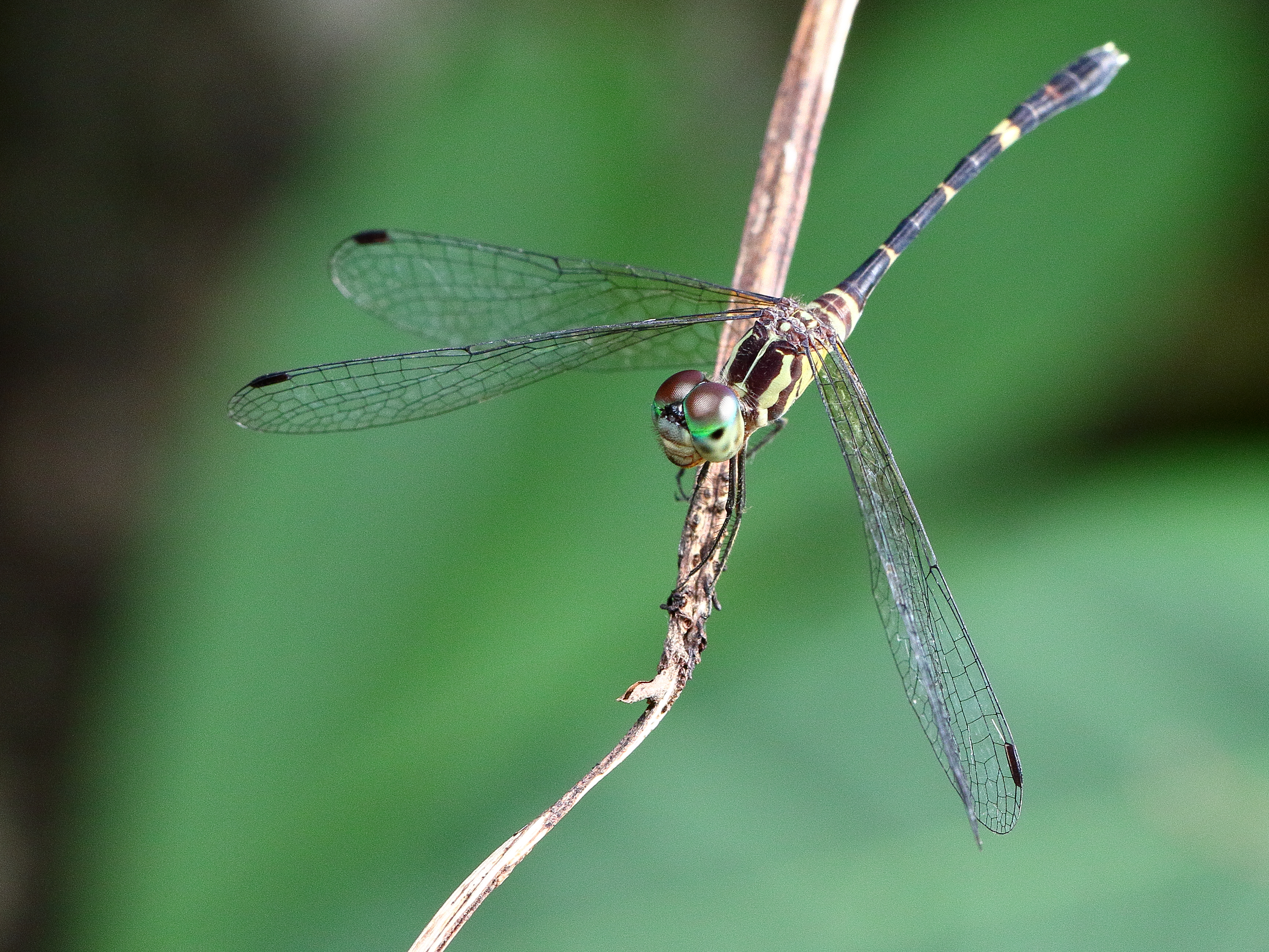
- Cairns, Queensland

Conservation status
- Least Concern (IUCN 3.1)

Scientific classification
- Kingdom: Animalia
- Phylum: Arthropoda
- Clade: Pancrustacea
- Class: Insecta
- Order: Odonata
- Suborder: Anisoptera
- Superfamily: Libelluloidea
- Family: Libellulidae
- Genus: Nannophlebia
- Species: N. eludens

Binomial name
- Nannophlebia eludens Tillyard, 1908

= Nannophlebia eludens =

Elusive archtail

Species of dragonfly

Nannophlebia eludens is a species of dragonfly of the family Libellulidae, known as the elusive archtail. It inhabits streams and rivers of northern Australia. It is a small dragonfly with black and yellow markings and a slender body.

== Etymology ==
The genus name Nannophlebia is derived from the Greek νάννος (nannos, "dwarf") and φλέψ (phleps, "vein"). The name combines elements used in the existing genera Nannophya and Neophlebia.

The species name eludens is derived from the Latin eludere ("to evade" or "escape"), referring to its zig-zag flight when disturbed after resting.

== Gallery ==
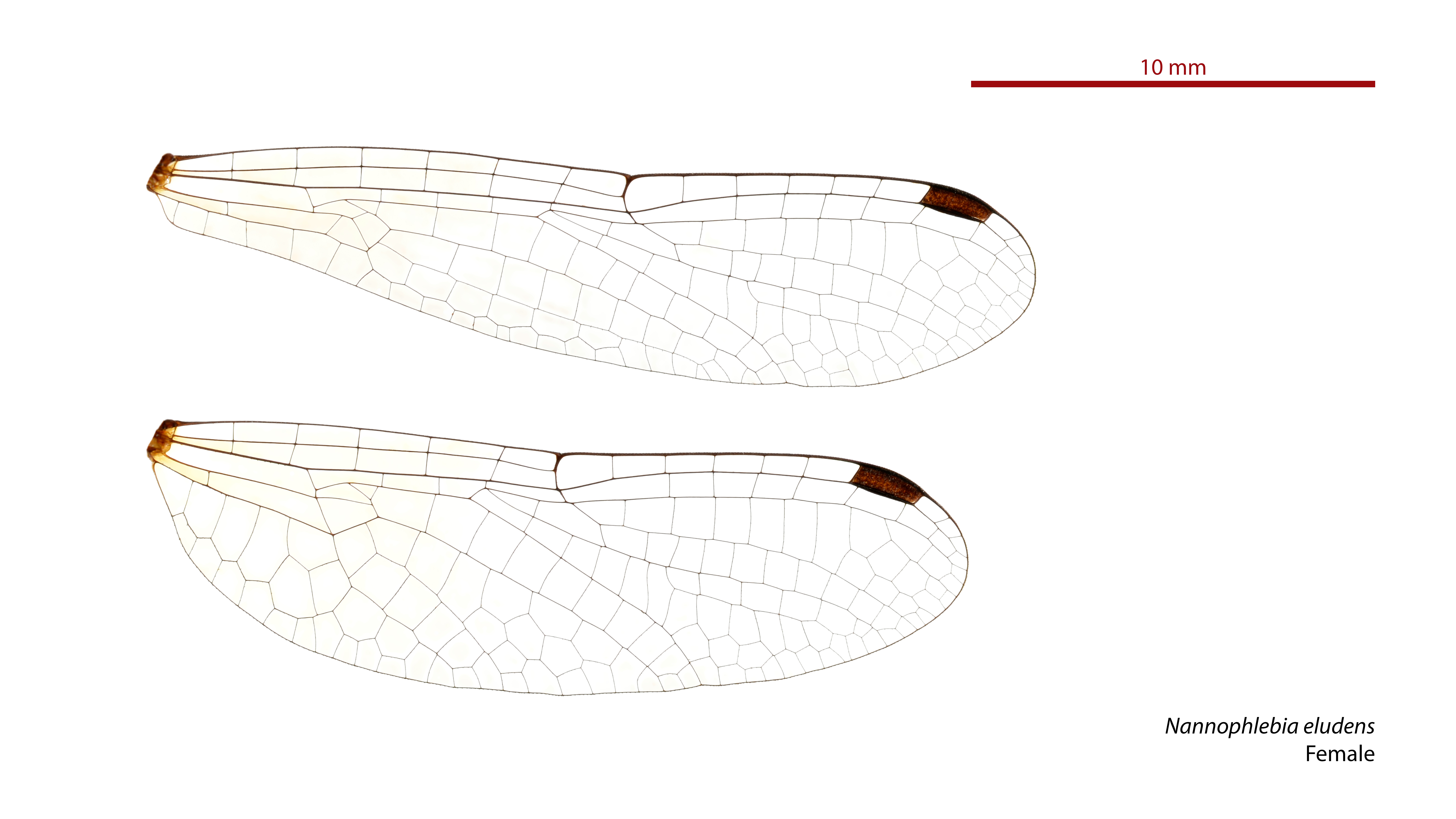
Female wings

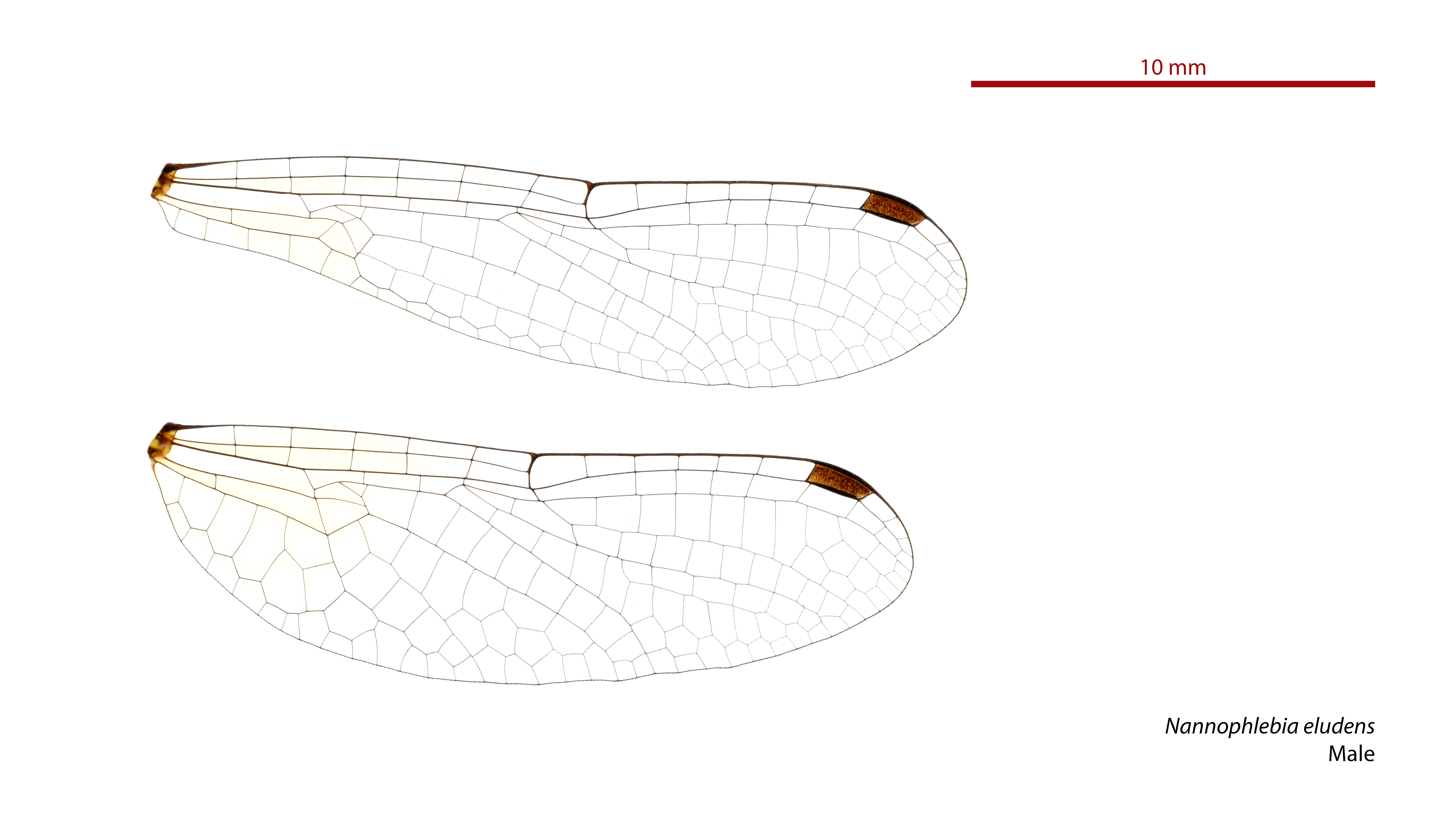
Male wings

== See also ==
- List of Odonata species of Australia
