= Somatochlora shanxiensis =

Conservation status
- Data Deficient (IUCN 3.1)

Scientific classification
- Kingdom: Animalia
- Phylum: Arthropoda
- Clade: Pancrustacea
- Class: Insecta
- Order: Odonata
- Infraorder: Anisoptera
- Superfamily: Libelluloidea
- Family: Corduliidae
- Genus: Somatochlora
- Species: S. shanxiensis

Binomial name
- Somatochlora shanxiensis Zhu & Zhang, 1999

Species of dragonfly

Somatochlora shanxiensis is a species of dragonfly in the family Corduliidae. It is a metallic green to black dragonfly with yellow spots and a total length of 51 to 53 mm. It was described in 1999 based on specimens from Shanxi, China, and has also been recorded in Hubei. It is most similar to Somatochlora graeseri and Somatochlora uchidai.
