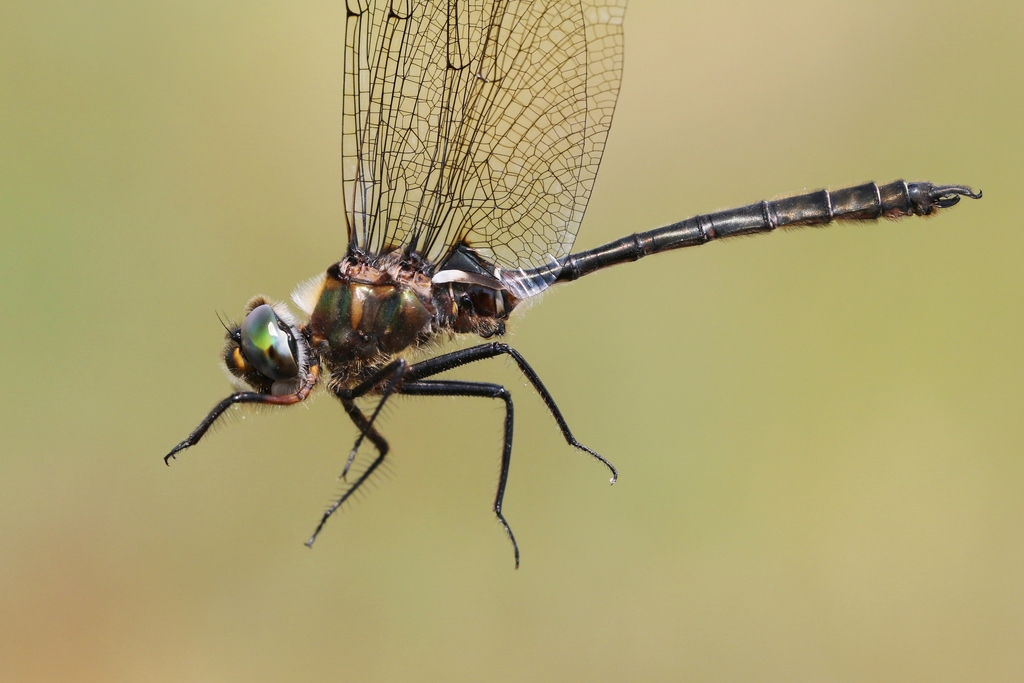
- male

Conservation status
- Least Concern (IUCN 3.1)

- Secure (NatureServe)

Scientific classification
- Kingdom: Animalia
- Phylum: Arthropoda
- Clade: Pancrustacea
- Class: Insecta
- Order: Odonata
- Infraorder: Anisoptera
- Superfamily: Libelluloidea
- Family: Corduliidae
- Genus: Somatochlora
- Species: S. septentrionalis

Binomial name
- Somatochlora septentrionalis (Hagen, 1861)

Synonyms
- Cordulia septentrionalis Hagen, 1861

= Somatochlora septentrionalis =

Species of dragonfly

Somatochlora septentrionalis, the muskeg emerald, is a species of dragonfly in the family Corduliidae. It is endemic to Canada, where it is found from Yukon and British Columbia east to Nova Scotia and Newfoundland.

== Description ==
Adult muskeg emeralds are 39–48 mm (1.5–1.9 in) long. The body is metallic green, brown and black, with a faint yellow spot on the thorax. This species is identical to Whitehouse's emerald (Somatochlora whitehousei) except in the shape of the male cerci and the female subgenital plate.

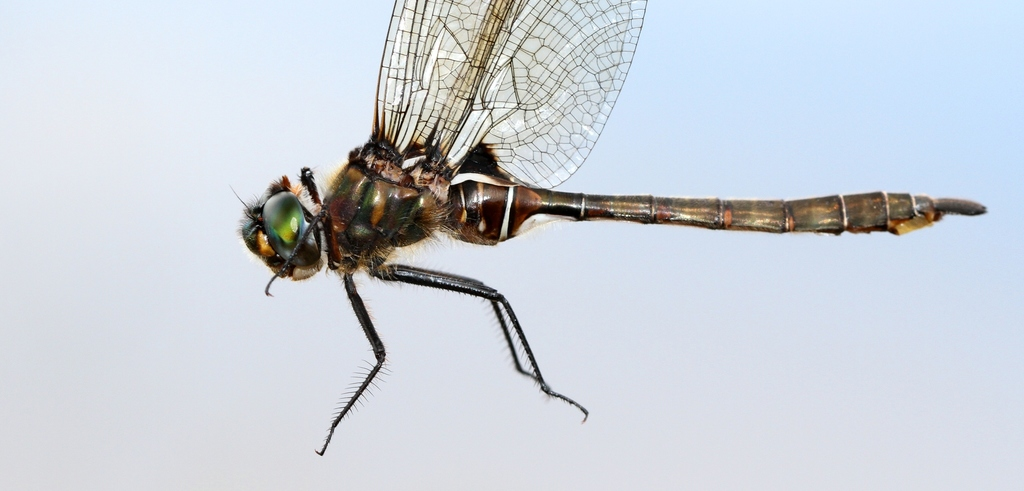
female

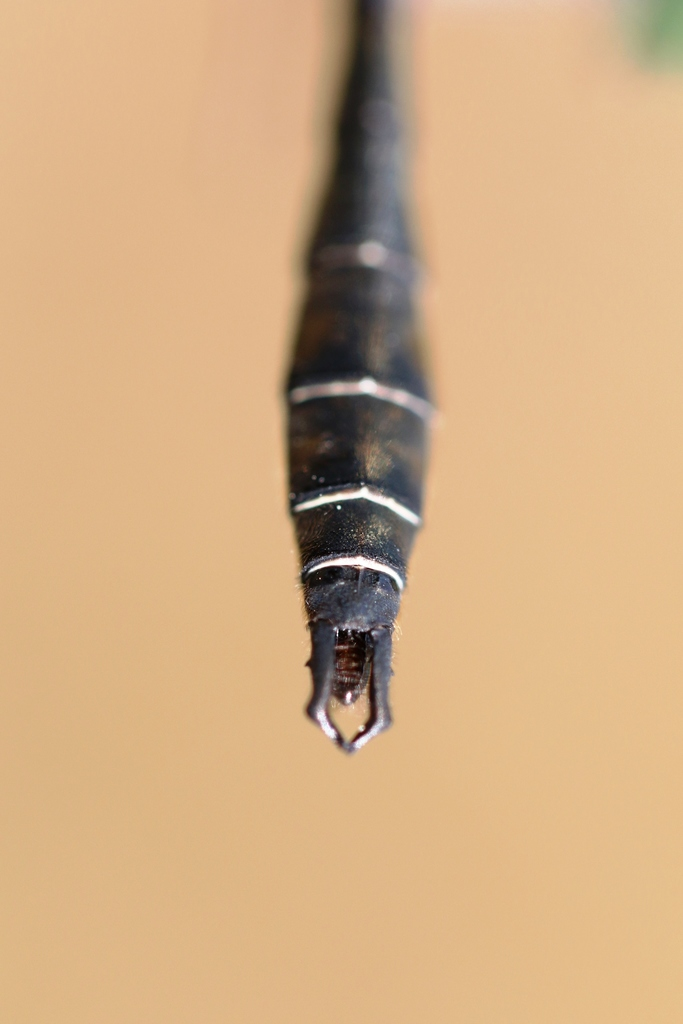
male cerci

== Life History ==
Muskeg emeralds occur in open fens with pools of open water. Males patrol over the pools, and females lay eggs by tapping in the open water and in floating vegetation. Adults fly from June to August.
