= Somatochlora viridiaenea =

- male

Conservation status
- Least Concern (IUCN 3.1)

Scientific classification
- Kingdom: Animalia
- Phylum: Arthropoda
- Clade: Pancrustacea
- Class: Insecta
- Order: Odonata
- Suborder: Anisoptera
- Superfamily: Libelluloidea
- Family: Corduliidae
- Genus: Somatochlora
- Species: S. viridiaenea

Binomial name
- Somatochlora viridiaenea (Uhler, 1858)

Synonyms
- Cordulia viridiaenea Uhler, 1858; Somatochlora atrovirens Selys, 1883; Somatochlora lingyinensis Zhou & Wei, 1979

Species of dragonfly

Somatochlora viridiaenea is a species of dragonfly in the family Corduliidae. The species was described in 1858 by American entomologist Philip Reese Uhler based on a female specimen from Hokkaido, Japan. It has also been recorded on Honshu, in eastern Russia, and in Zhejiang, China. The Zhejiang specimen was described as a separate species, but a 2021 paper found that it should be treated as part of S. viridiaenea. Its closest relative is another East Asian species, S. clavata.

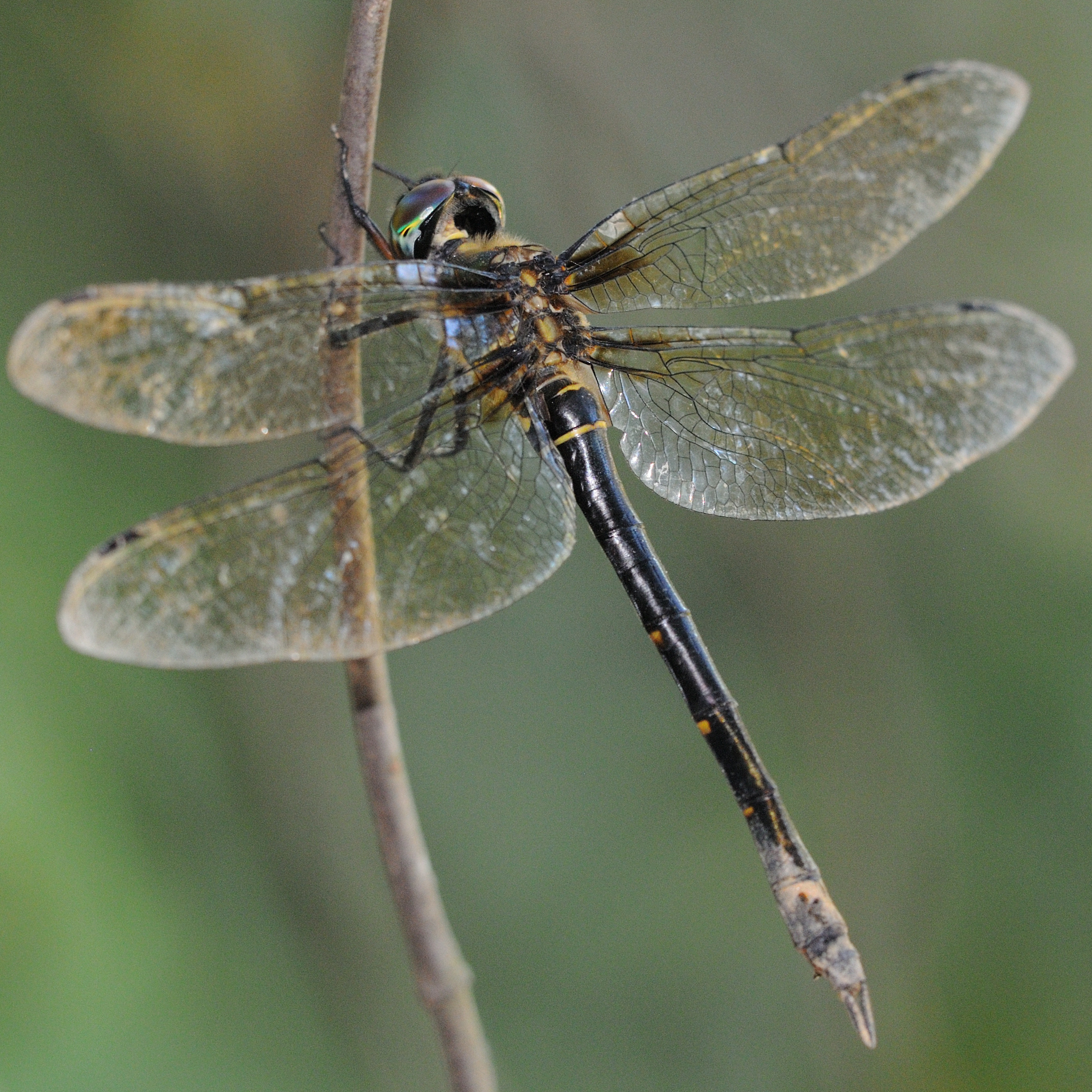
female

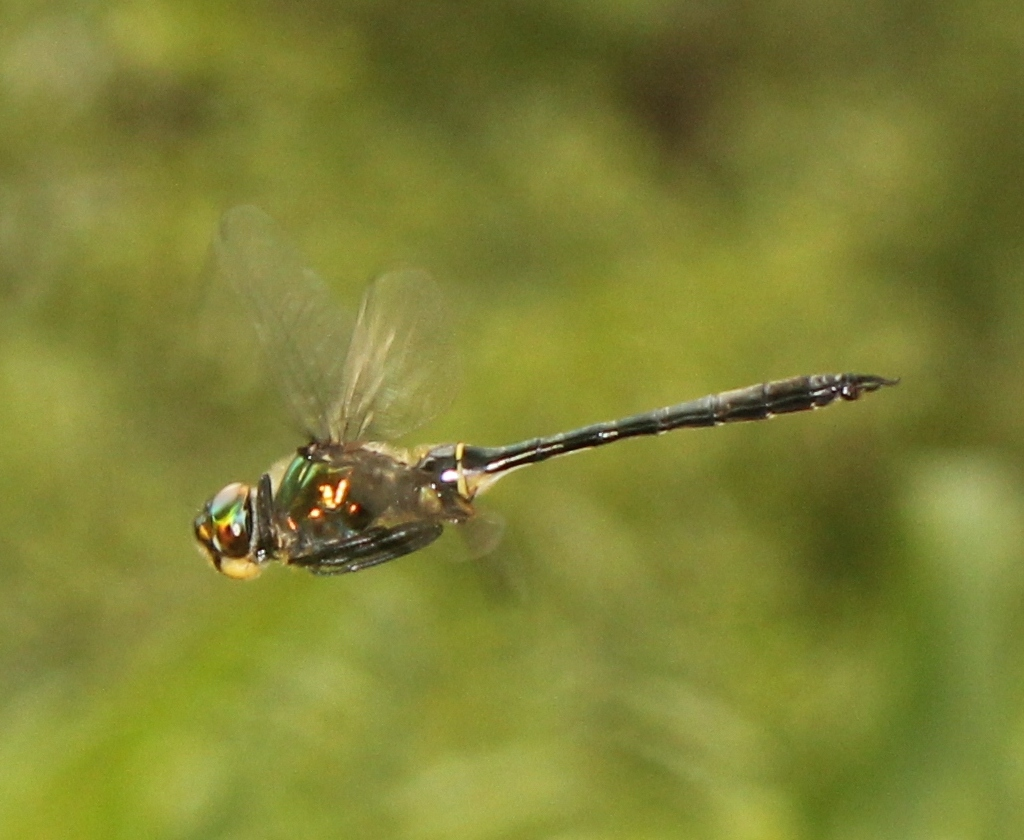
male in flight
