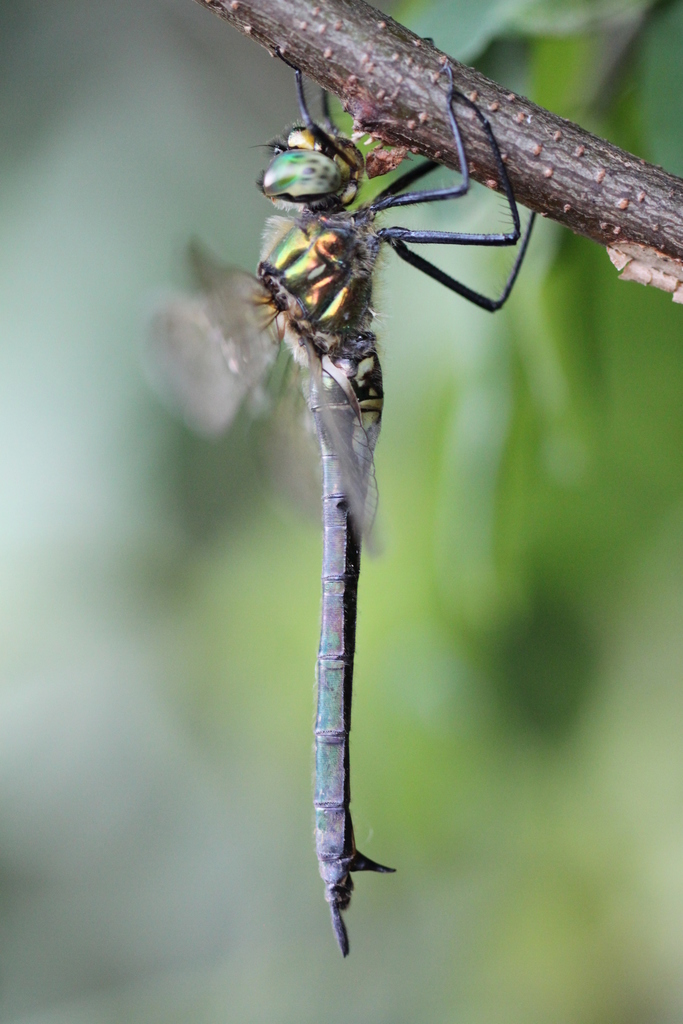
- Female

Conservation status
- Least Concern (IUCN 3.1)

Scientific classification
- Kingdom: Animalia
- Phylum: Arthropoda
- Clade: Pancrustacea
- Class: Insecta
- Order: Odonata
- Infraorder: Anisoptera
- Superfamily: Libelluloidea
- Family: Corduliidae
- Genus: Somatochlora
- Species: S. meridionalis

Binomial name
- Somatochlora meridionalis Nielsen, 1935

= Somatochlora meridionalis =

Species of dragonfly

Somatochlora meridionalis, the Balkan emerald, is a species of dragonfly in the family Corduliidae. It occurs in southeastern Europe from France to the Czech Republic to Turkey. It is found at narrow, shallow, shaded streams.

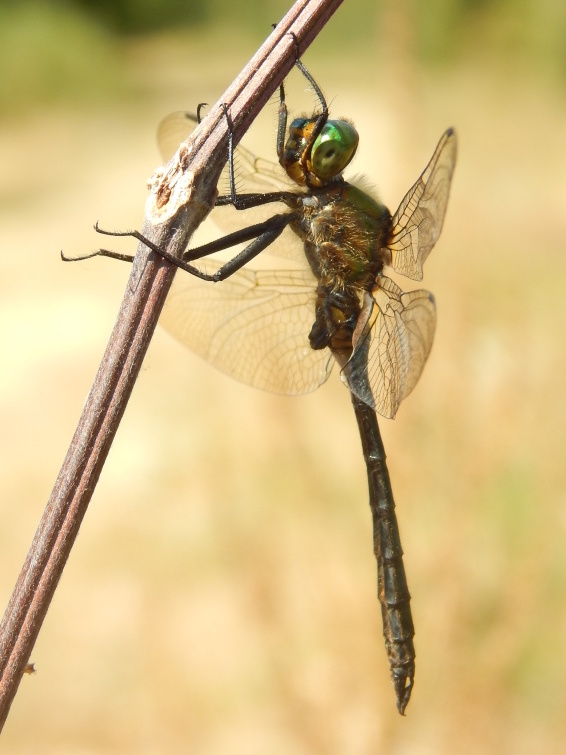
male

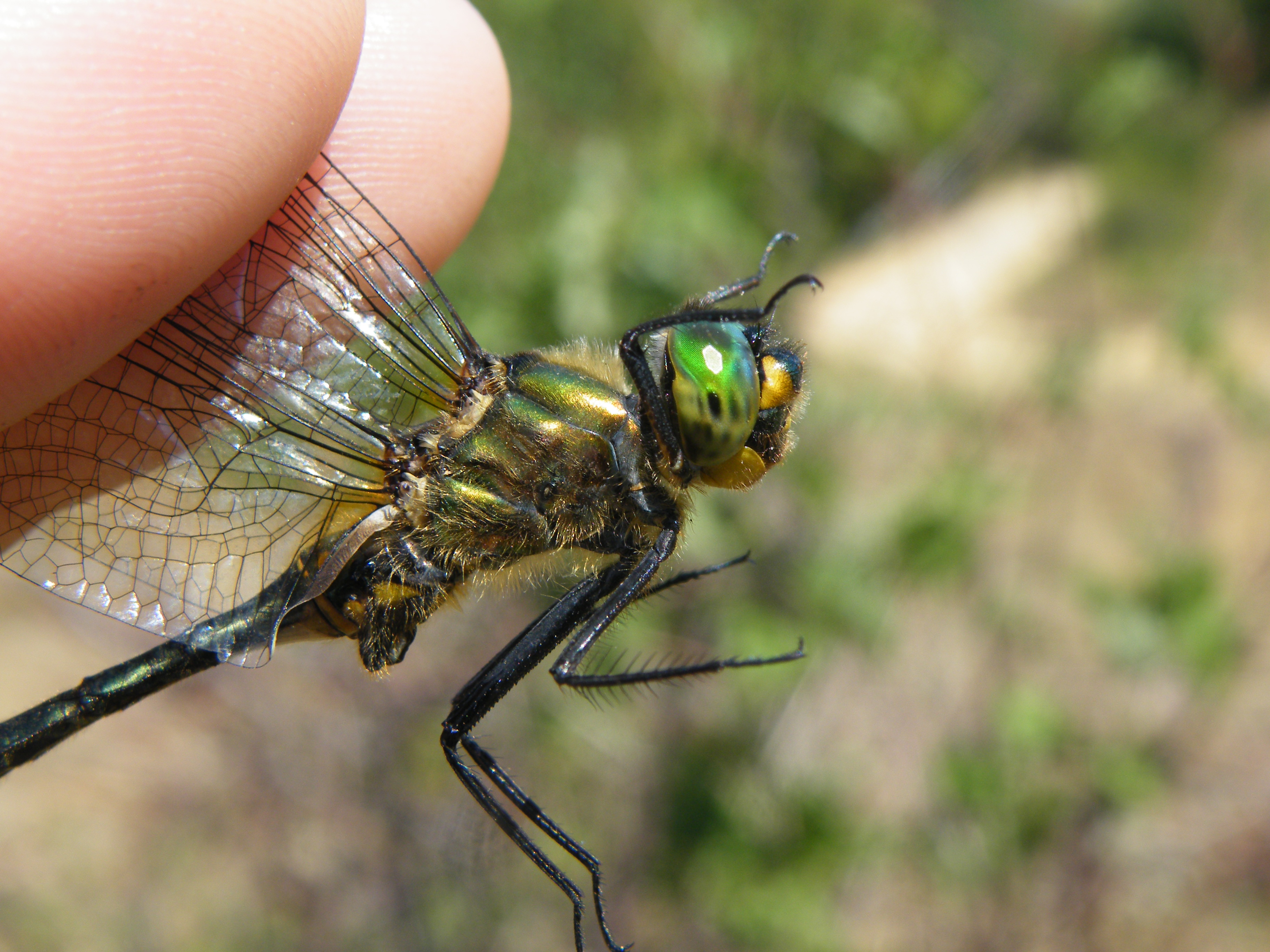
close-up of head and thorax
