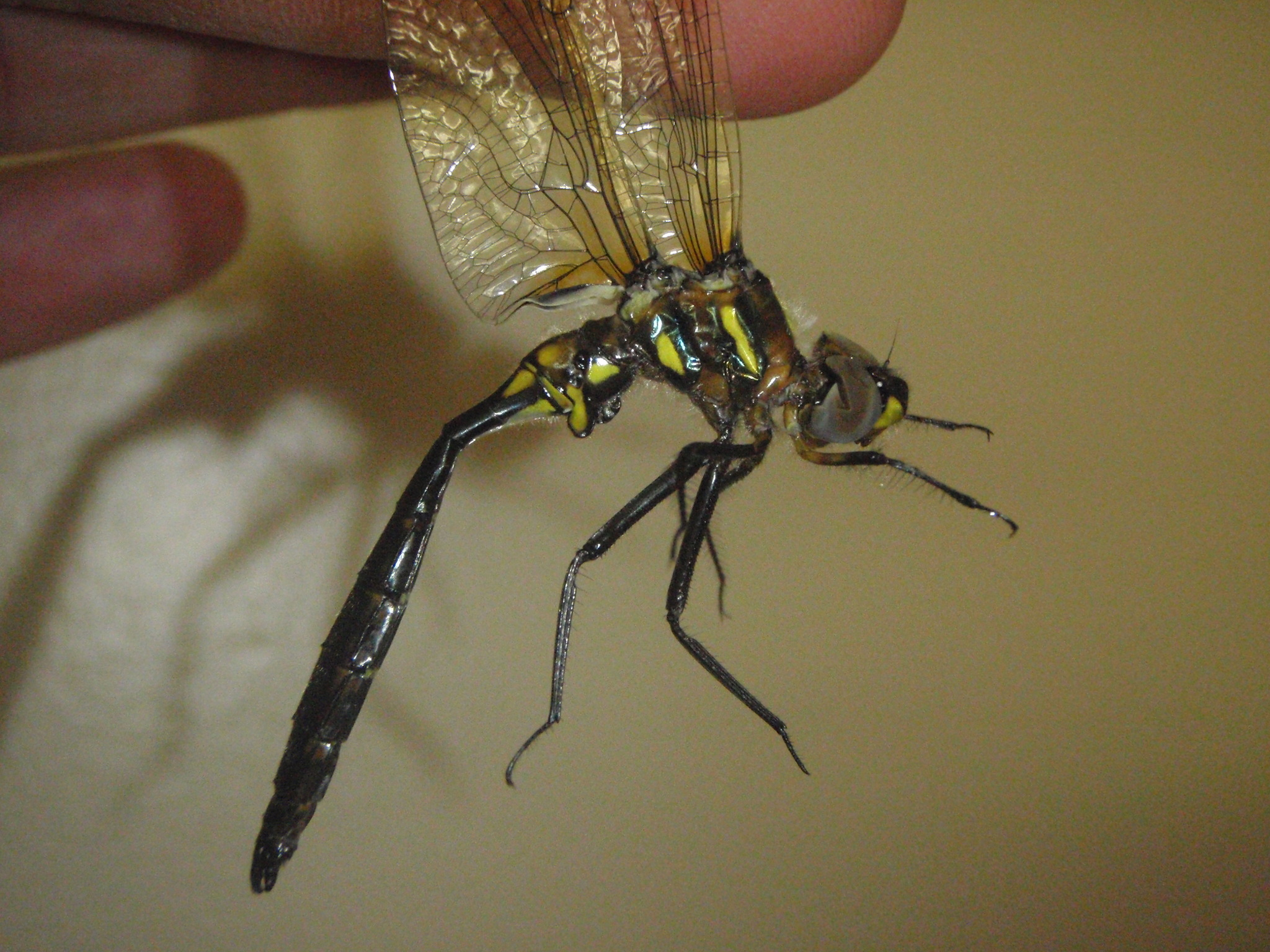

Conservation status
- Least Concern (IUCN 3.1)

Scientific classification
- Kingdom: Animalia
- Phylum: Arthropoda
- Clade: Pancrustacea
- Class: Insecta
- Order: Odonata
- Infraorder: Anisoptera
- Superfamily: Libelluloidea
- Family: Corduliidae
- Genus: Somatochlora
- Species: S. ensigera

Binomial name
- Somatochlora ensigera Martin, 1906

Synonyms
- Somatochlora charadraea Williamson, 1907

= Somatochlora ensigera =

Species of dragonfly

Somatochlora ensigera, the plains emerald, is a species of dragonfly in the family Corduliidae. It is found in central North America.

== Description ==
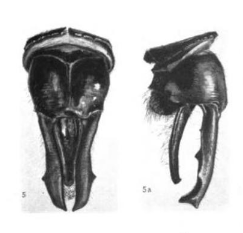
male genitalia

Like other species in the genus Somatochlora, S. ensigera is a dark metallic green dragonfly with clear wings. There are bold yellow spots on the side of the thorax. The male cerci are distinctively shaped when compared to related species. Individuals measure about 50 mm (2.0 in) in length.

== Taxonomy ==
illustration of S. ensigera from the original 1906 description

Somatochlora ensigera was first scientifically described in 1906 by French entomologist René Martin, based on a female specimen from Montana. In a 1907 publication, sent to press before the previous description had been published, American entomologist Edward Bruce Williamson described Somatochlora charadraea based on a male specimen from Colorado; this was later determined to be the same species as Somatochlora ensigera

== Distribution ==
Somatochlora ensigera is found across the northern Great Plains of southern Canada and the northern United States west to Saskatchewan, Wyoming, and Colorado, with rare occurrences in the eastern Midwest and Southern Ontario.

== Life History ==
Somatochlora ensigera breeds in slow-flowing streams and small rivers that have pools and riffles. These habitats are typically wooded in the east, and in open areas but lined with a band of riparian shrubs and trees in the west. Males fly low along streams with occasional hovering. Females lay eggs in clay or gravel near or in water, beginning in the early morning. Both sexes will perch on vegetation along the streamside. Adults fly from June to September.

== Conservation status ==
The IUCN conservation status of Somatochlora ensigera is least concern, with no immediate threat to the species' survival.
