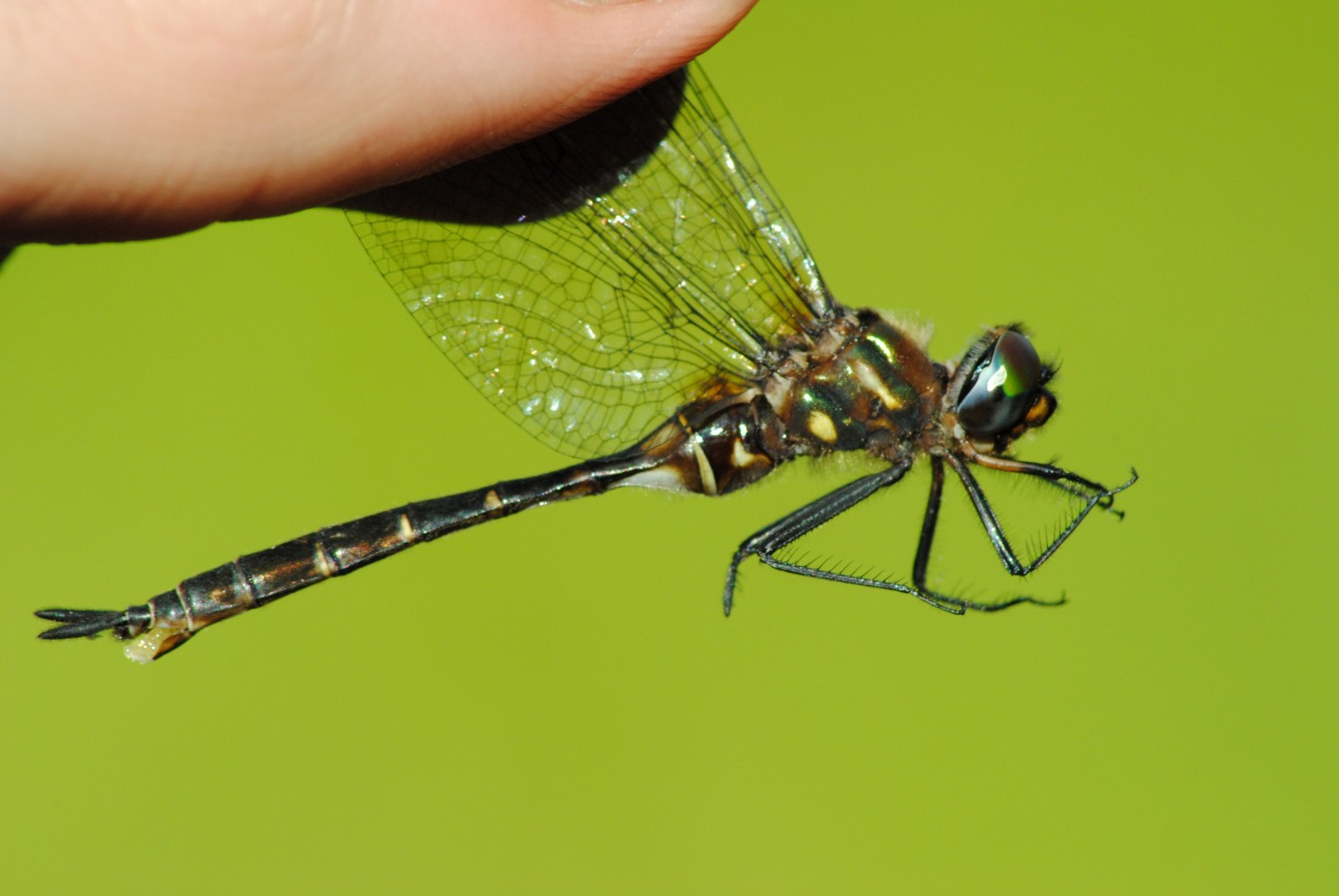

Conservation status
- Least Concern (IUCN 3.1)

Scientific classification
- Kingdom: Animalia
- Phylum: Arthropoda
- Clade: Pancrustacea
- Class: Insecta
- Order: Odonata
- Infraorder: Anisoptera
- Superfamily: Libelluloidea
- Family: Corduliidae
- Genus: Somatochlora
- Species: S. walshii

Binomial name
- Somatochlora walshii (Scudder, 1866)

Synonyms
- Cordulia walshii Scudder, 1866

= Somatochlora walshii =

Species of dragonfly

Somatochlora walshii, the brush-tipped emerald, is a species of emerald dragonfly in the family Corduliidae. It is found in North America.

The IUCN conservation status of Somatochlora walshii is "LC", least concern, with no immediate threat to the species' survival. The population is stable. It is an insect. The brush tipped emerald is widespread across the south of Canada, Including (But not limited to) British Columbia, Alberta, Quebec, And Ontario. Also found In The North of The United States, Including; Minnesota, Washington, Maine, New Hampshire, Vermont, And New York.
