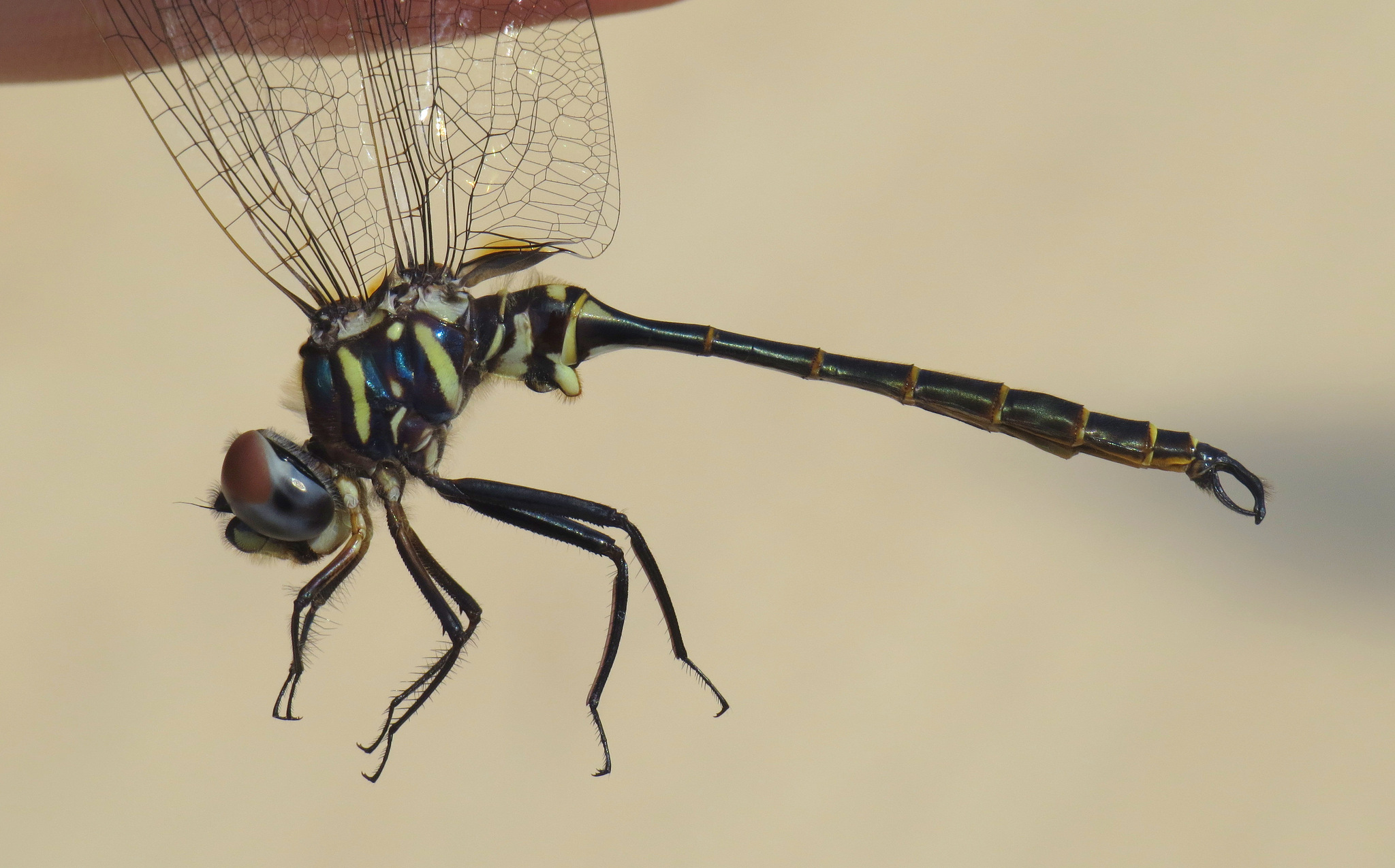

Conservation status
- Data Deficient (IUCN 3.1)

Scientific classification
- Kingdom: Animalia
- Phylum: Arthropoda
- Clade: Pancrustacea
- Class: Insecta
- Order: Odonata
- Infraorder: Anisoptera
- Superfamily: Libelluloidea
- Family: Corduliidae
- Genus: Somatochlora
- Species: S. calverti

Binomial name
- Somatochlora calverti Williamson & Gloyd, 1933

= Somatochlora calverti =

Species of dragonfly

Somatochlora calverti, the Calvert's emerald, is a species of dragonfly in the family Corduliidae. It is endemic to the United States. Its natural habitats are rivers and swamps.
