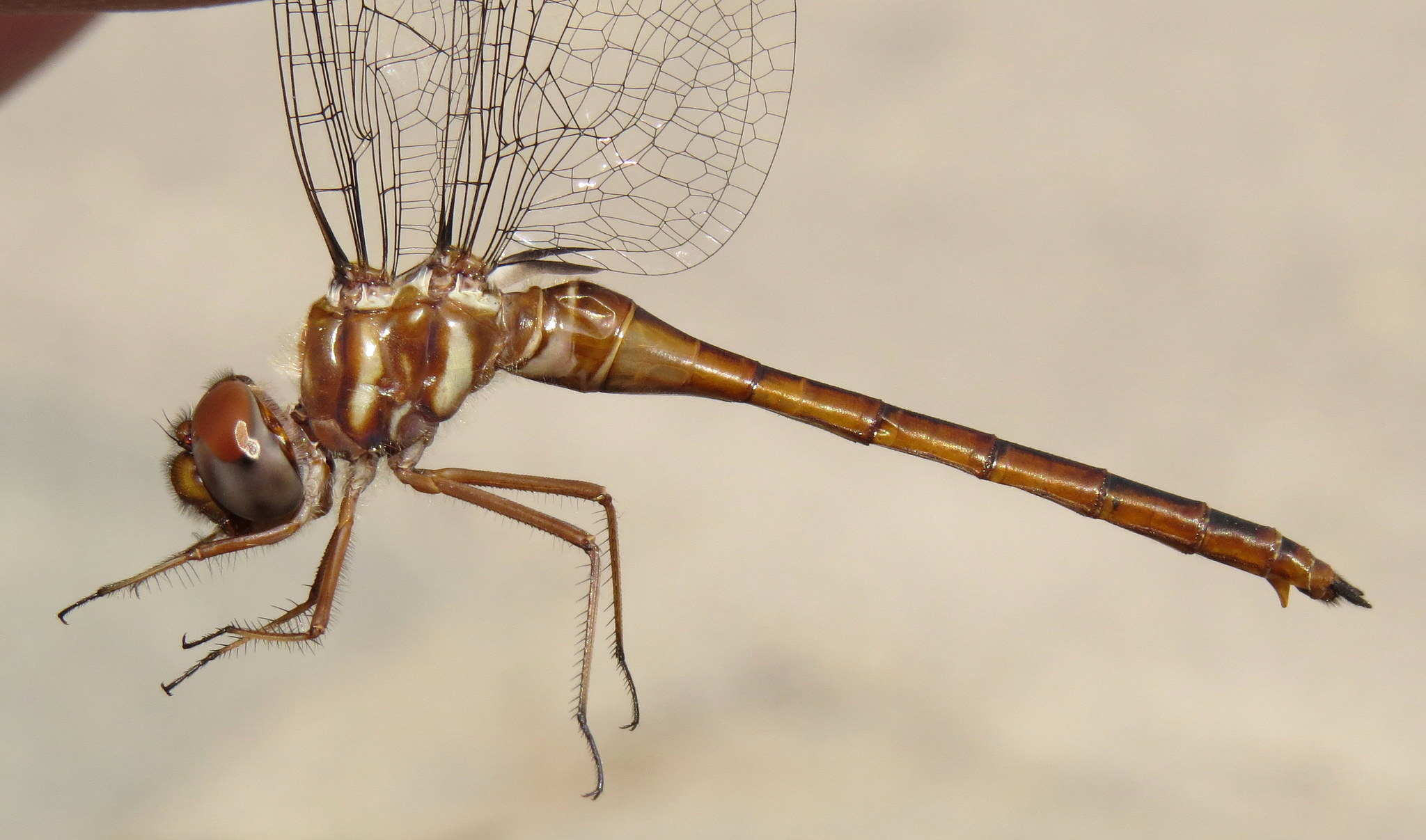

Conservation status
- Data Deficient (IUCN 3.1)

Scientific classification
- Kingdom: Animalia
- Phylum: Arthropoda
- Clade: Pancrustacea
- Class: Insecta
- Order: Odonata
- Infraorder: Anisoptera
- Superfamily: Libelluloidea
- Family: Corduliidae
- Genus: Somatochlora
- Species: S. georgiana

Binomial name
- Somatochlora georgiana Walker, 1925

= Somatochlora georgiana =

Species of dragonfly

Somatochlora georgiana, the coppery emerald, is a species of emerald dragonfly in the family Corduliidae. It is found in North America.
