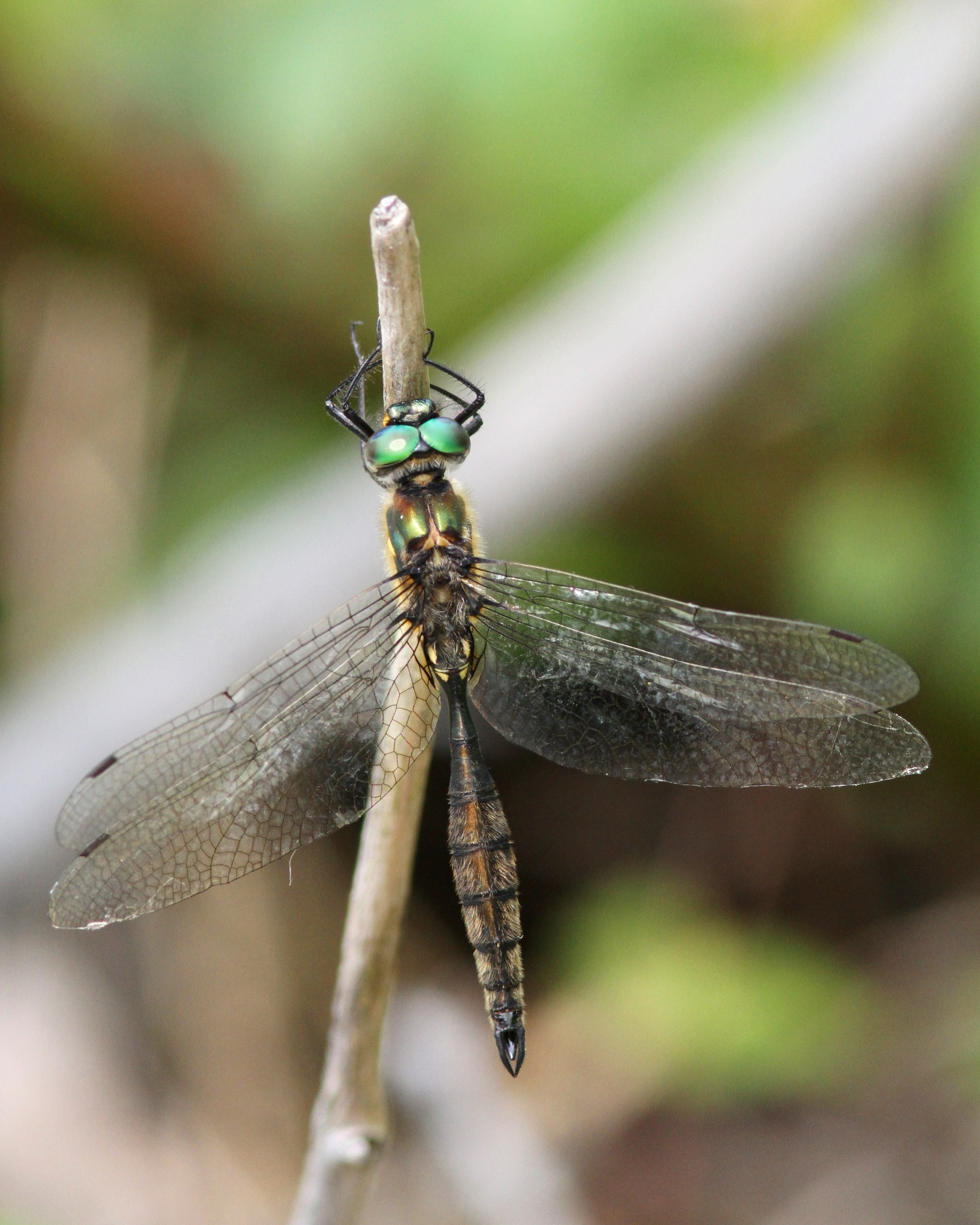

Conservation status
- Least Concern (IUCN 3.1)

Scientific classification
- Kingdom: Animalia
- Phylum: Arthropoda
- Clade: Pancrustacea
- Class: Insecta
- Order: Odonata
- Infraorder: Anisoptera
- Superfamily: Libelluloidea
- Family: Corduliidae
- Genus: Somatochlora
- Species: S. minor

Binomial name
- Somatochlora minor Calvert in Harvey, 1898

= Somatochlora minor =

Species of dragonfly

Somatochlora minor, the ocellated emerald, is a species of emerald dragonfly in the family Corduliidae. It is found in North America.

The IUCN conservation status of Somatochlora minor is "LC", least concern, with no immediate threat to the species' survival. The population is stable.

== Description ==
The ocellated emerald is a small dragonfly. It has a metallic green face. The thorax is brown and metallic green with conspicuous pale yellow oval spots on each side. The abdomen is black with yellow spots on the basal segments. The female has a downward-facing spike near the end of the abdomen.

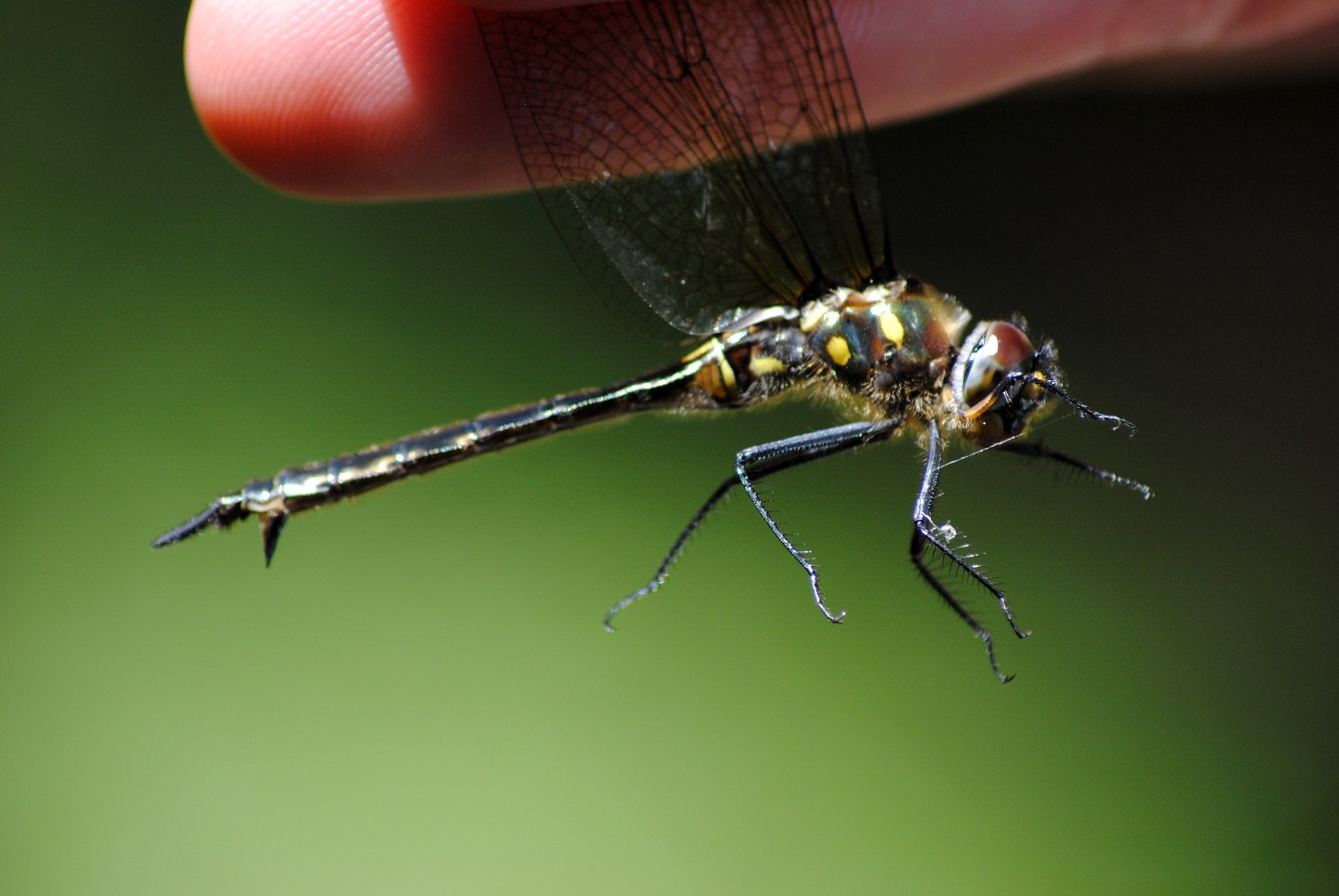
Female adult

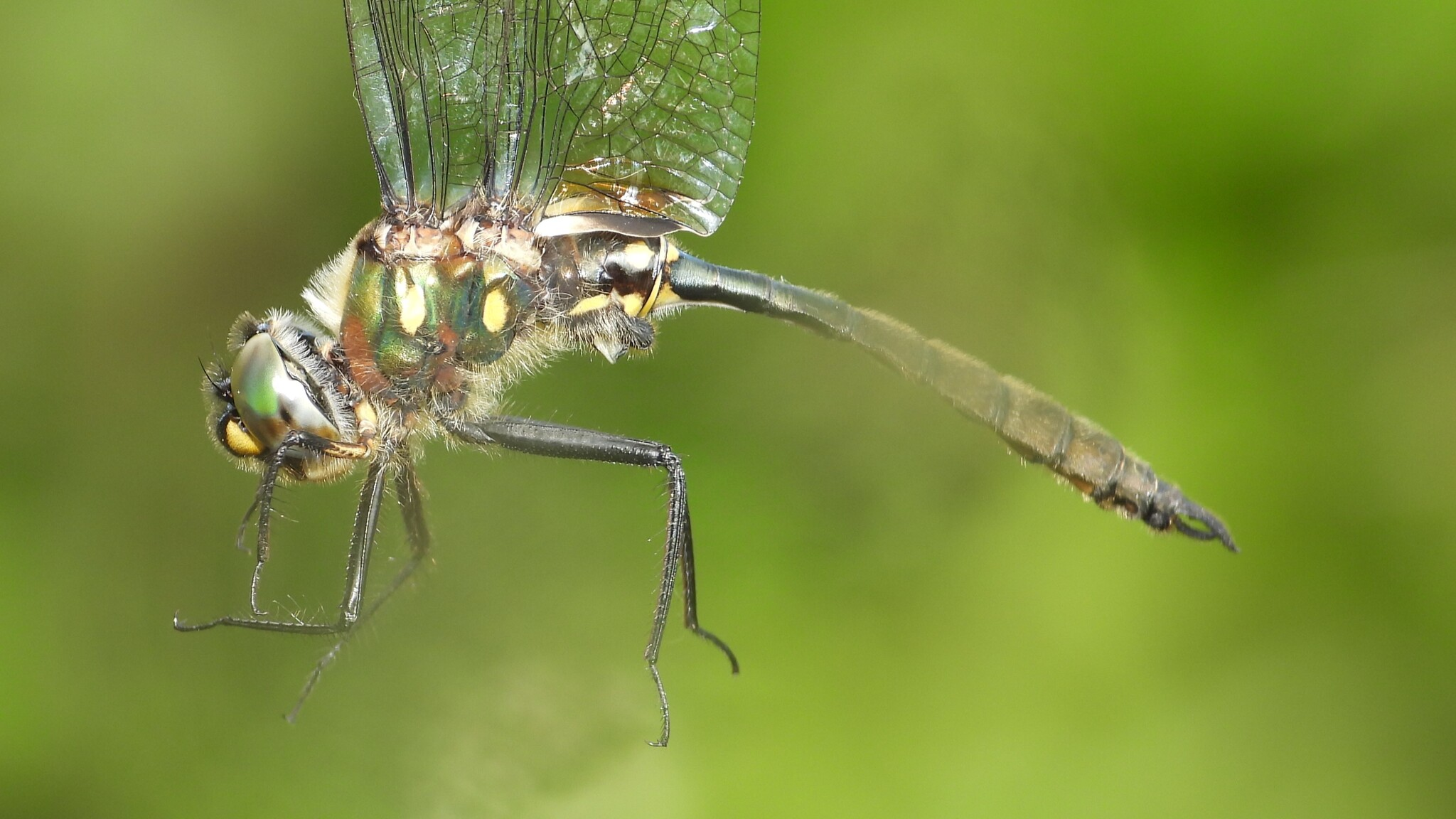
Male adult

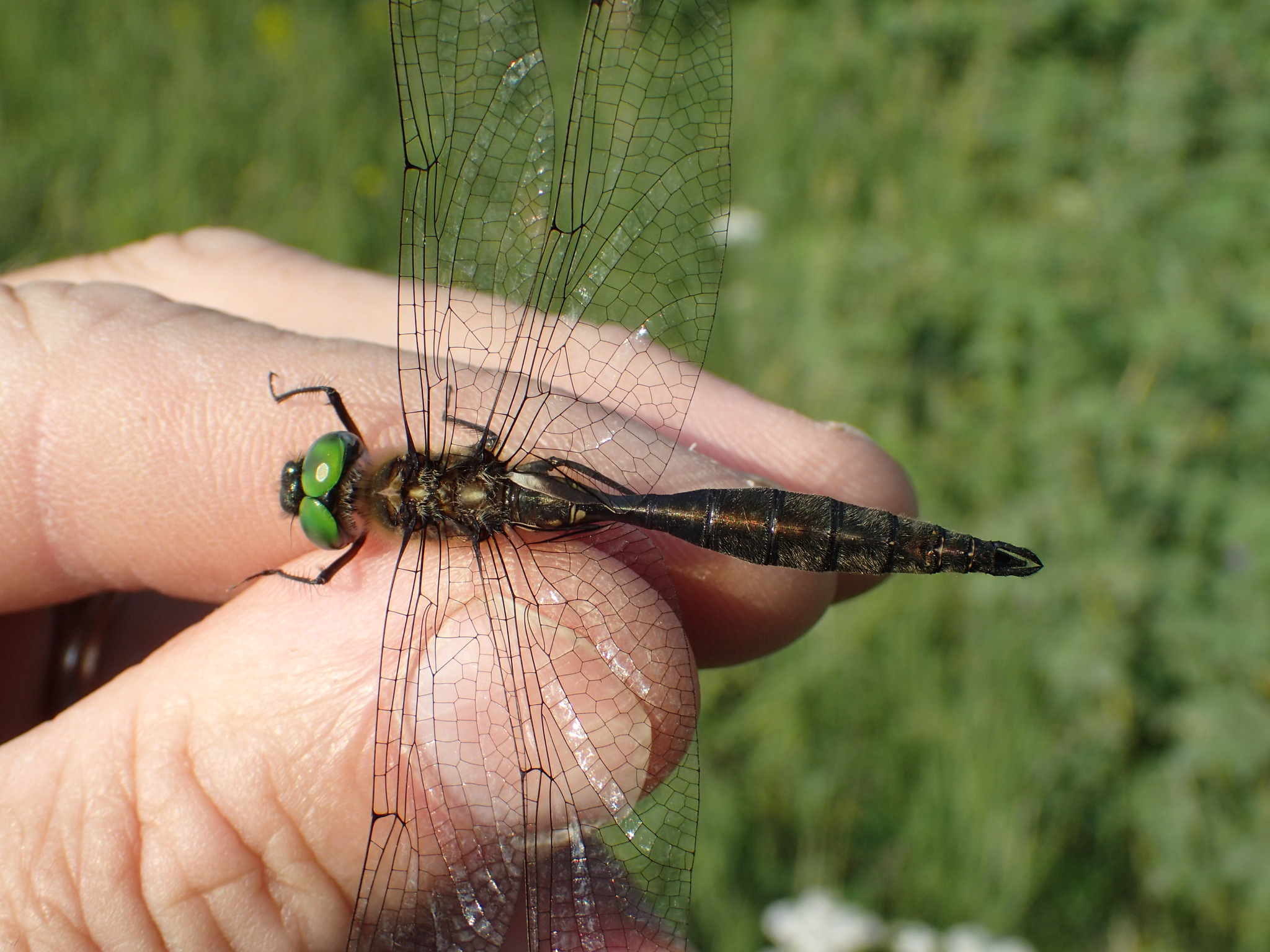
Dorsal view

== Etymology ==
The genus name Somatochlora means "green bodied", referring to the metallic green coloration of some of its members. The specific epithet minor refers to its small size.

The common name refers to the eye-like spots on the sides of the adult's thorax and the species classification as an emerald.

== Behavior ==
The ocellated emerald often perches on vegetation near small streams between patrols flying close to the water surface.

It oviposits using either repeated taps of moving water or alternating taps of the water surface near the shore and mossy bank above.

== Distribution ==
The ocellated emerald can be found across much of Canada and parts of the northern United States.

== Habitat ==
The ocellated emerald inhabits small to medium, slow to moderately fast streams with pools, in forested or open surroundings.
