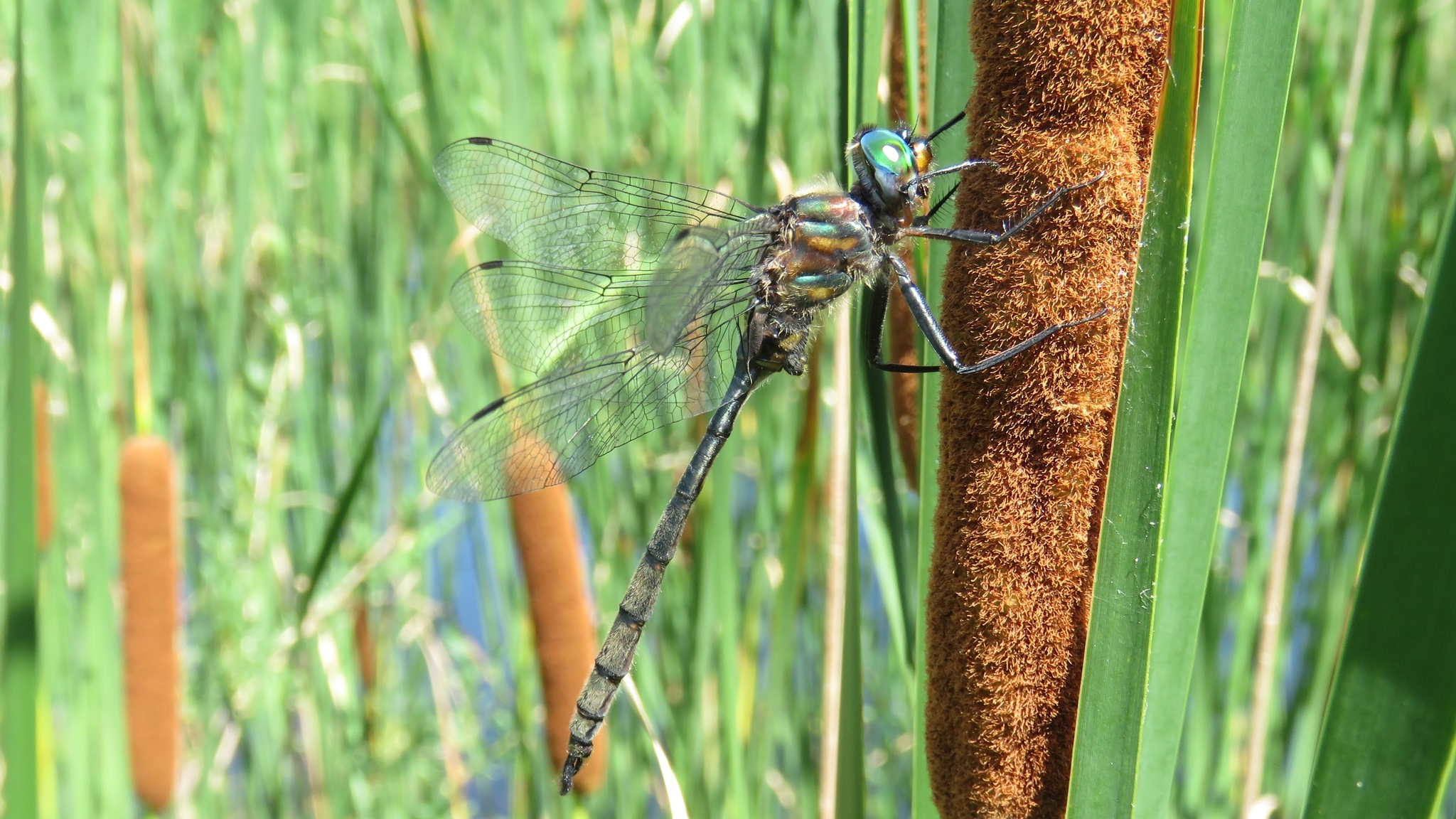

Conservation status
- Least Concern (IUCN 3.1)

Scientific classification
- Kingdom: Animalia
- Phylum: Arthropoda
- Clade: Pancrustacea
- Class: Insecta
- Order: Odonata
- Infraorder: Anisoptera
- Superfamily: Libelluloidea
- Family: Corduliidae
- Genus: Somatochlora
- Species: S. williamsoni

Binomial name
- Somatochlora williamsoni Walker, 1907

= Somatochlora williamsoni =

Species of dragonfly

Somatochlora williamsoni, or Williamson's emerald, is a species of emerald dragonfly in the family Corduliidae. It is found in North America.

The IUCN conservation status of Somatochlora williamsoni is "LC", least concern, with no immediate threat to the species' survival. The population is stable.
