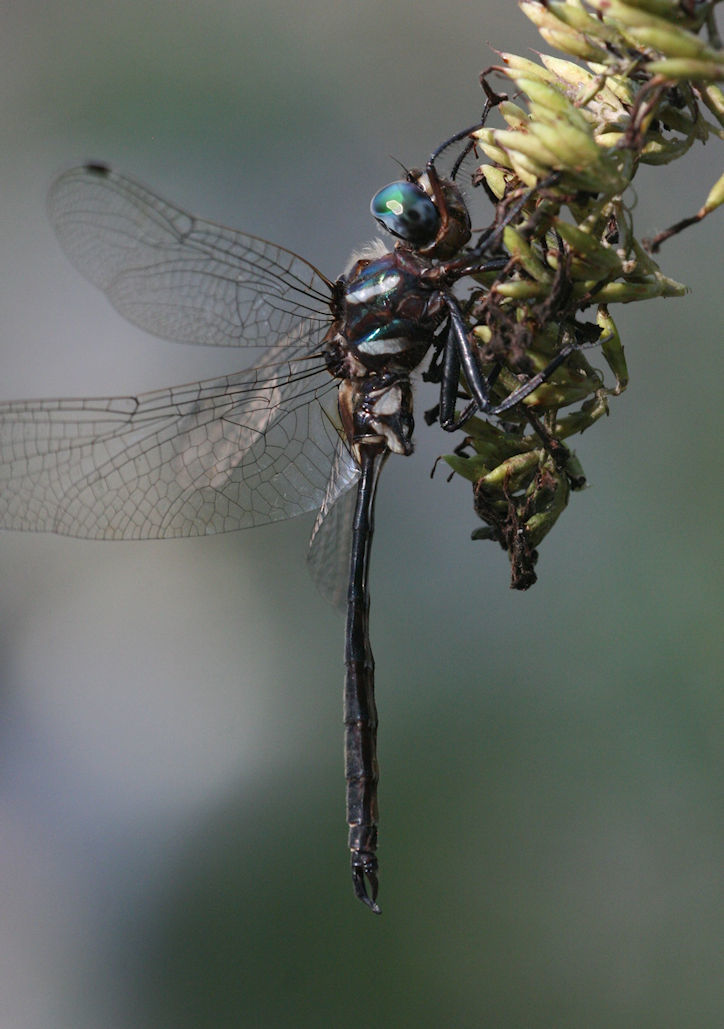

Conservation status
- Near Threatened (IUCN 3.1)

- Vulnerable (NatureServe)

Scientific classification
- Kingdom: Animalia
- Phylum: Arthropoda
- Clade: Pancrustacea
- Class: Insecta
- Order: Odonata
- Infraorder: Anisoptera
- Superfamily: Libelluloidea
- Family: Corduliidae
- Genus: Somatochlora
- Species: S. ozarkensis

Binomial name
- Somatochlora ozarkensis Bird, 1933

= Somatochlora ozarkensis =

Species of dragonfly

Somatochlora ozarkensis, the Ozark emerald is a species of dragonfly in the family Corduliidae. It is endemic to Kansas, Missouri, Oklahoma and Arkansas in the United States, where its natural habitat in rivers.
