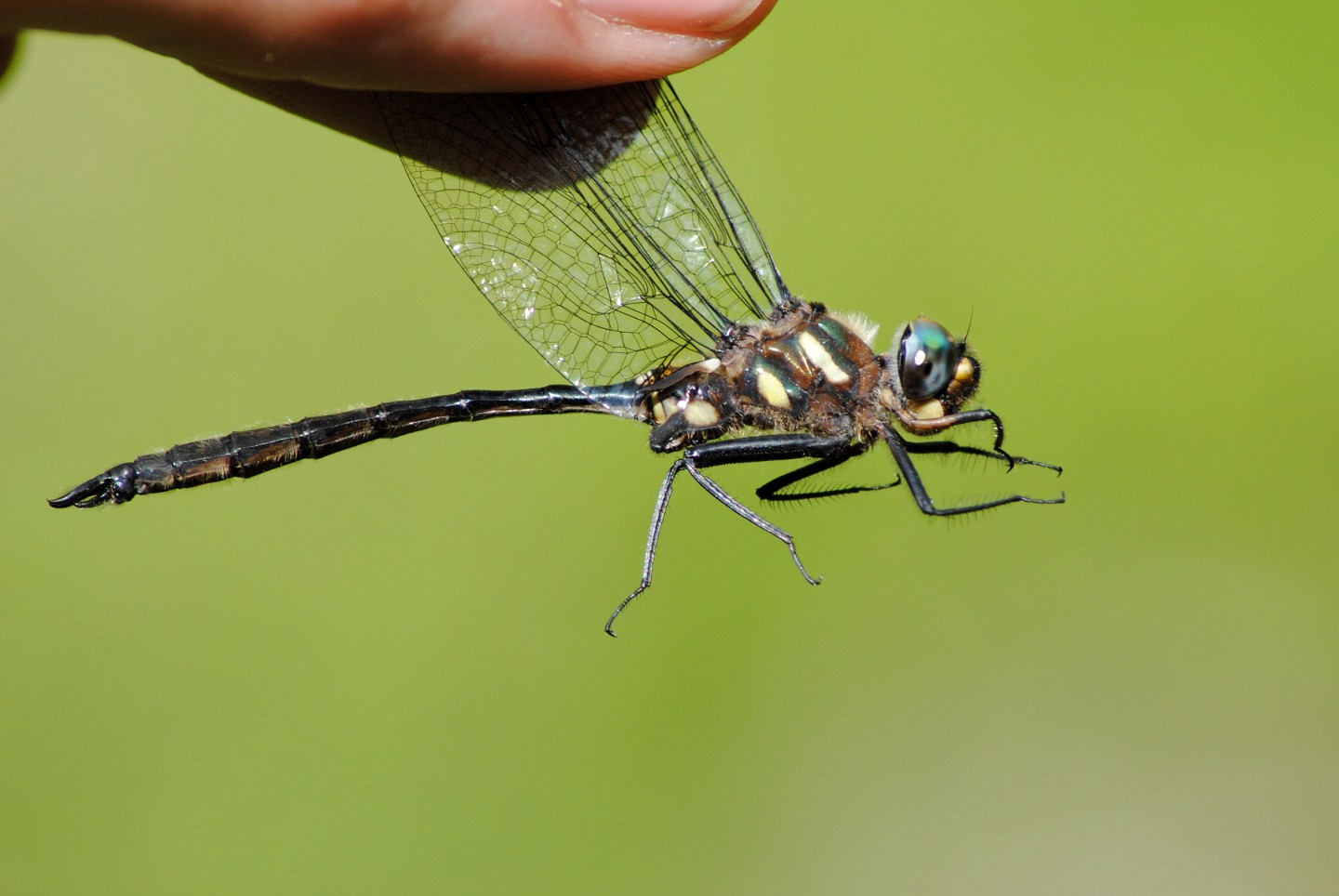

Conservation status
- Least Concern (IUCN 3.1)

Scientific classification
- Kingdom: Animalia
- Phylum: Arthropoda
- Clade: Pancrustacea
- Class: Insecta
- Order: Odonata
- Infraorder: Anisoptera
- Superfamily: Libelluloidea
- Family: Corduliidae
- Genus: Somatochlora
- Species: S. elongata

Binomial name
- Somatochlora elongata (Scudder, 1866)

Synonyms
- Cordulia elongata Scudder, 1866

= Somatochlora elongata =

Species of dragonfly

Somatochlora elongata, the ski-tipped emerald or ski-tailed emerald, is a species of dragonfly in the family Corduliidae. It is found in North America.

The IUCN conservation status of Somatochlora elongata is "LC", least concern, with no immediate threat to the species' survival. The population is stable.
