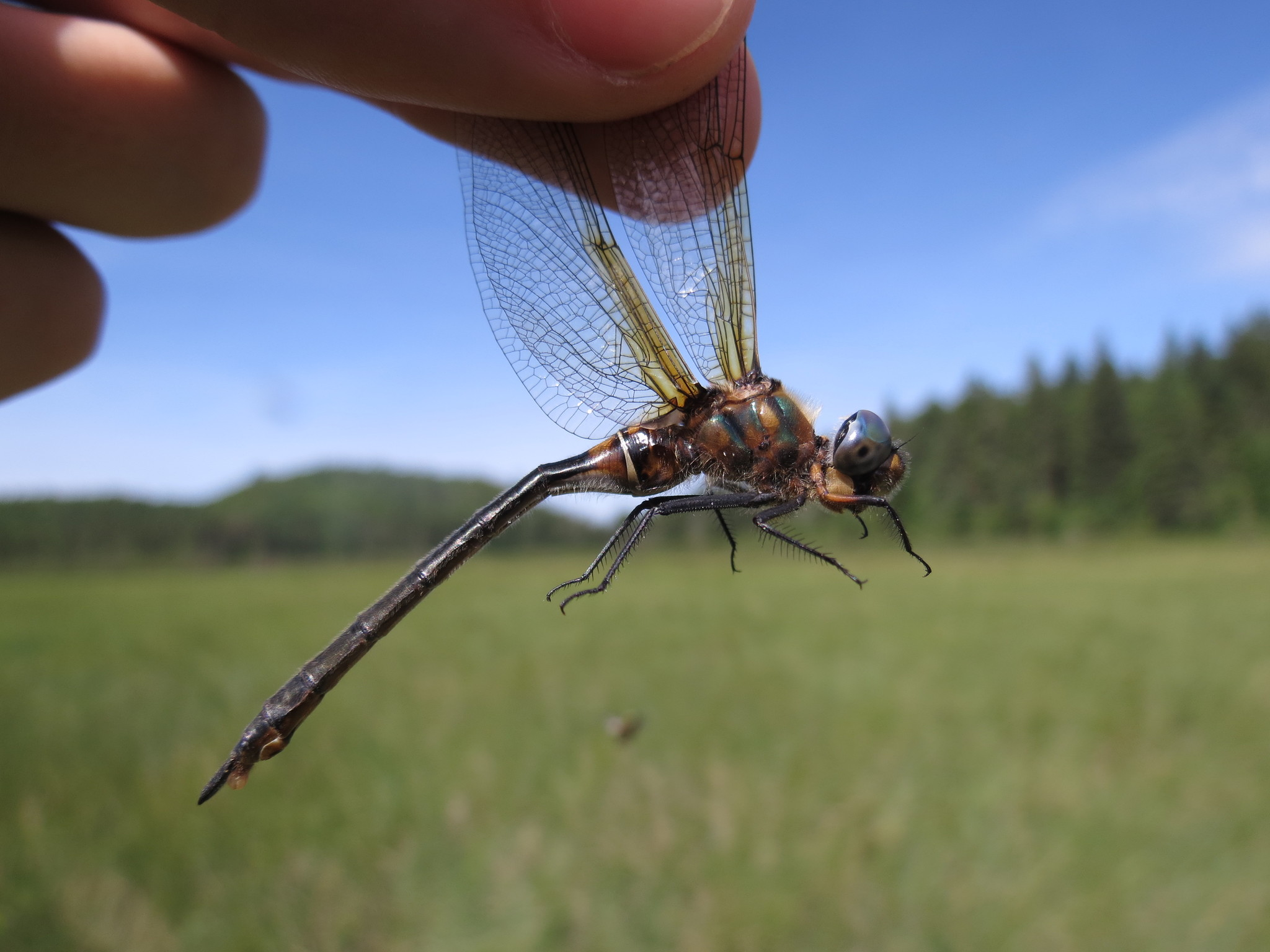

Conservation status
- Least Concern (IUCN 3.1)

Scientific classification
- Kingdom: Animalia
- Phylum: Arthropoda
- Clade: Pancrustacea
- Class: Insecta
- Order: Odonata
- Infraorder: Anisoptera
- Superfamily: Libelluloidea
- Family: Corduliidae
- Genus: Somatochlora
- Species: S. kennedyi

Binomial name
- Somatochlora kennedyi Walker, 1918

= Somatochlora kennedyi =

Species of dragonfly

Somatochlora kennedyi, or Kennedy's emerald, is a species of emerald dragonfly in the family Corduliidae. It is found in North America.

The IUCN conservation status of Somatochlora kennedyi is "LC", least concern, with no immediate threat to the species' survival. The population is stable.
