= Somatochlora daviesi =

Conservation status
- Data Deficient (IUCN 3.1)

Scientific classification
- Kingdom: Animalia
- Phylum: Arthropoda
- Clade: Pancrustacea
- Class: Insecta
- Order: Odonata
- Infraorder: Anisoptera
- Superfamily: Libelluloidea
- Family: Corduliidae
- Genus: Somatochlora
- Species: S. daviesi

Binomial name
- Somatochlora daviesi Lieftinck, 1977

Synonyms
- Somatochlora nepalensis Asahina, 1982

Species of dragonfly

Somatochlora daviesi is a species of dragonfly in the family Corduliidae. It was first described in 1977 based on specimens from Meghalaya, India, and is also known from Nepal and Bhutan. It resembles the east Asian S. dido in its small size and lack of yellow markings on most of the abdomen. Like other species in the genus, S. davisi is predominantly dark metallic brown to green. The formerly recognised Somatochlora nepalensis is now considered to be a synonym of S. daviesi.
