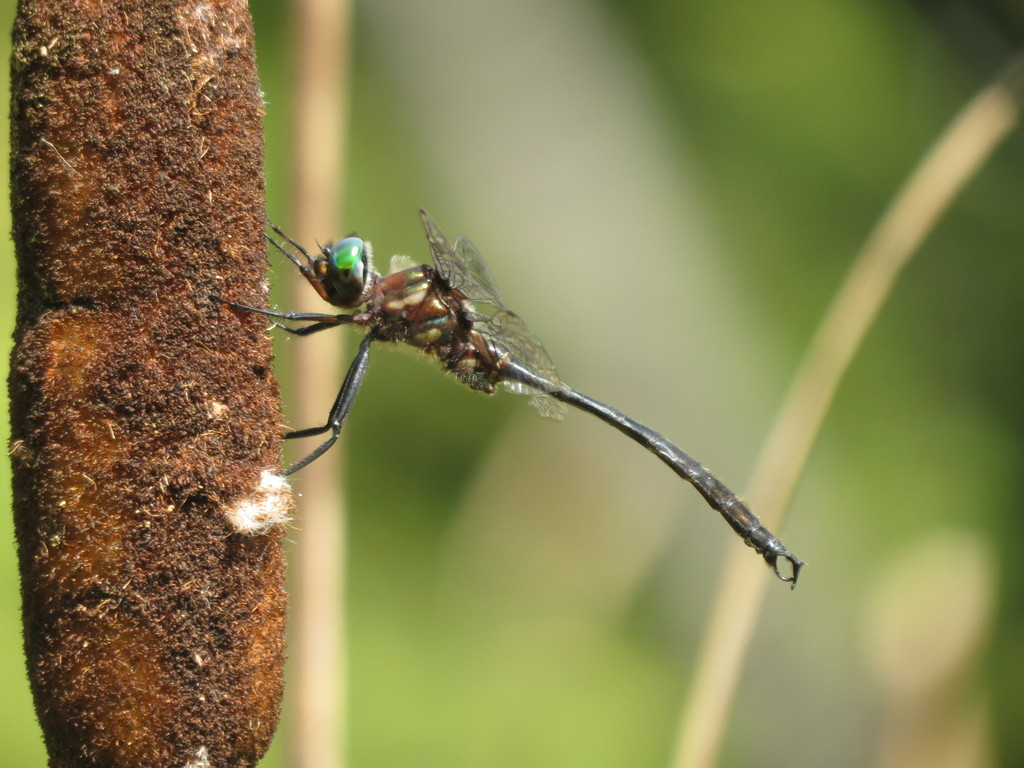

Conservation status
- Least Concern (IUCN 3.1)

Scientific classification
- Kingdom: Animalia
- Phylum: Arthropoda
- Clade: Pancrustacea
- Class: Insecta
- Order: Odonata
- Infraorder: Anisoptera
- Superfamily: Libelluloidea
- Family: Corduliidae
- Genus: Somatochlora
- Species: S. tenebrosa

Binomial name
- Somatochlora tenebrosa (Say, 1839)

Synonyms
- Libellula tenebrosa Say, 1839

= Somatochlora tenebrosa =

Species of dragonfly

Somatochlora tenebrosa, the clamp-tipped emerald, is a species of emerald dragonfly in the family Corduliidae. It is found in North America.

The IUCN conservation status of Somatochlora tenebrosa is "LC", least concern, with no immediate threat to the species' survival. The population is stable. The IUCN status was reviewed in 2017.
