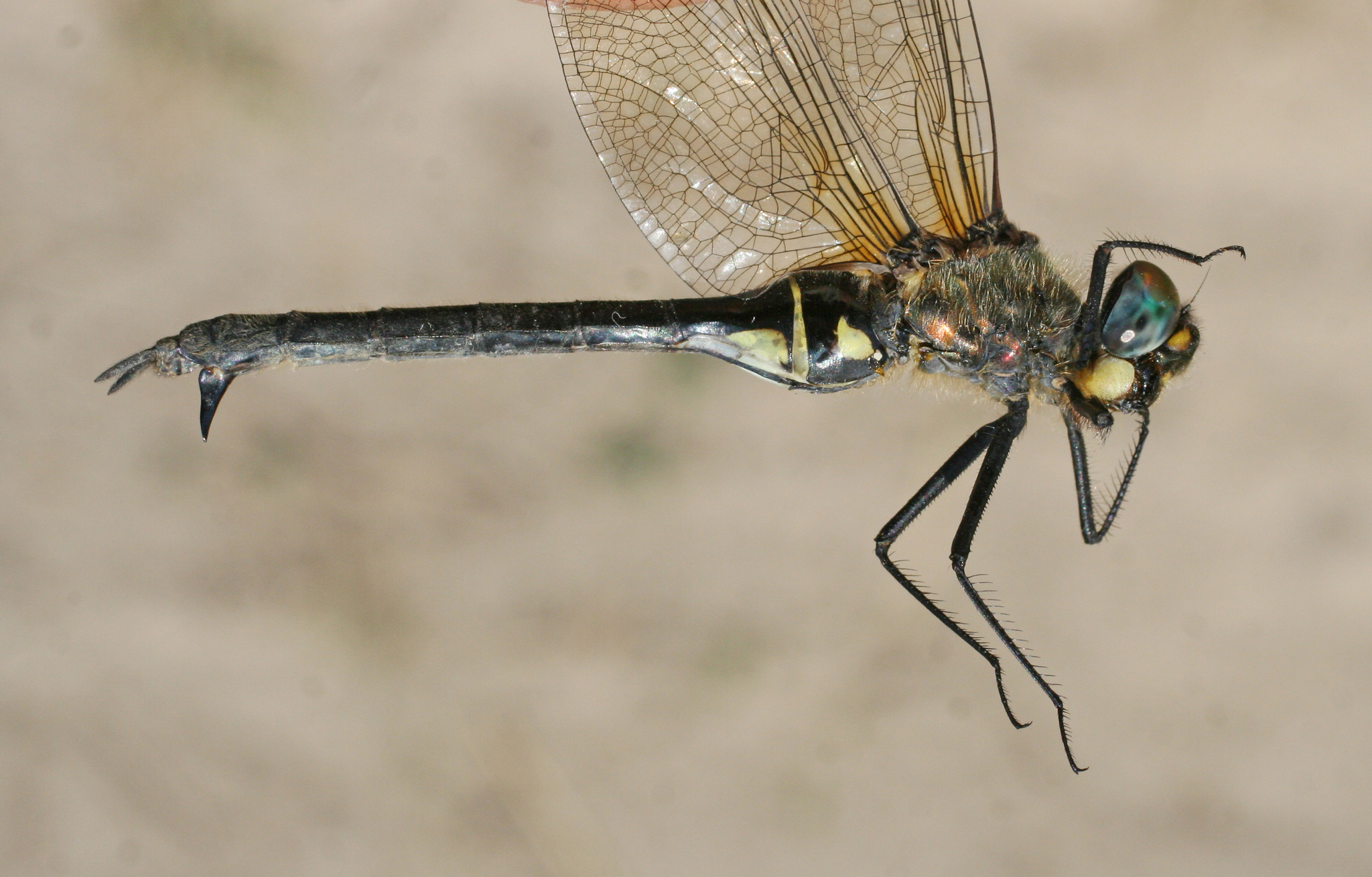

Conservation status
- Least Concern (IUCN 3.1)

Scientific classification
- Kingdom: Animalia
- Phylum: Arthropoda
- Clade: Pancrustacea
- Class: Insecta
- Order: Odonata
- Infraorder: Anisoptera
- Superfamily: Libelluloidea
- Family: Corduliidae
- Genus: Somatochlora
- Species: S. exuberata

Binomial name
- Somatochlora exuberata Bartenev, 1910

Synonyms
- Somatochlora japonica Matsumura, 1911

= Somatochlora exuberata =

Species of dragonfly

Somatochlora exuberata is a species of dragonfly in the family Corduliidae. It is found in eastern Russia, northern China, Korea, and Hokkaido, Japan.

== Taxonomy ==
The species was described in 1910 by Aleksandr Bartenev, based on a series of specimens collected in 1909 in what is now the Zabaykalsky Krai province of Russia.

=== Subspecies ===
The species is split into two valid subspecies:

- Somatochlora exuberata exuberata, the nominate subspecies
- Somatochlora exuberata japonica Matsumura, 1911
