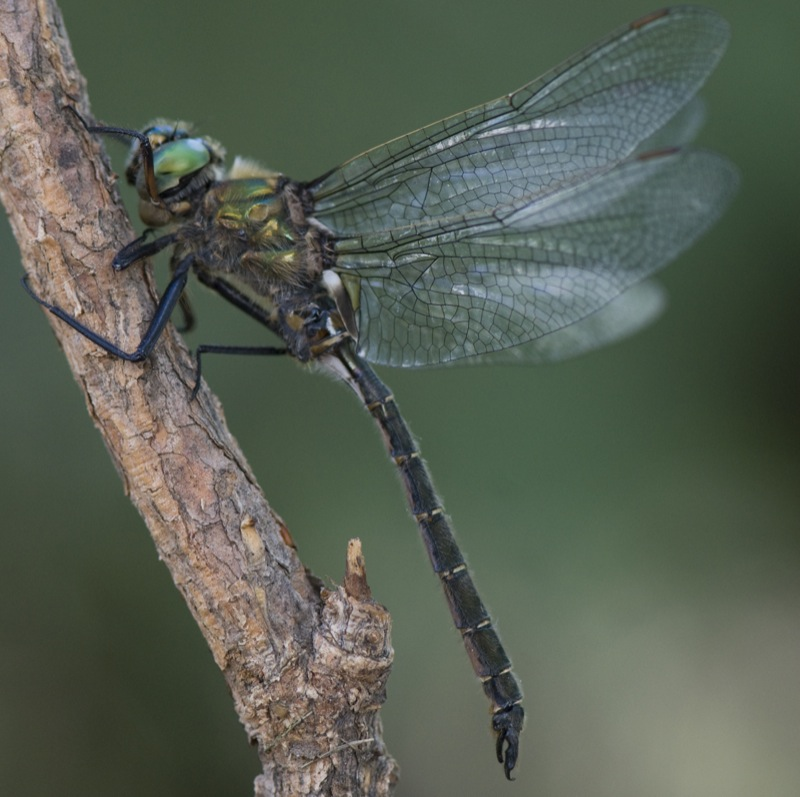

Conservation status
- Least Concern (IUCN 3.1)

Scientific classification
- Kingdom: Animalia
- Phylum: Arthropoda
- Clade: Pancrustacea
- Class: Insecta
- Order: Odonata
- Infraorder: Anisoptera
- Superfamily: Libelluloidea
- Family: Corduliidae
- Genus: Somatochlora
- Species: S. albicincta

Binomial name
- Somatochlora albicincta (Burmeister, 1839)

Synonyms
- Epophthalmia albicincta Burmeister, 1839; Cordulila eremita Scudder, 1866

= Somatochlora albicincta =

Species of dragonfly

Somatochlora albicincta, the ringed emerald, is a species of emerald dragonfly in the family Corduliidae. It is found in North America.

The IUCN conservation status of Somatochlora albicincta is "LC", least concern, with no immediate threat to the species' survival. The population is stable.

== Gallery ==
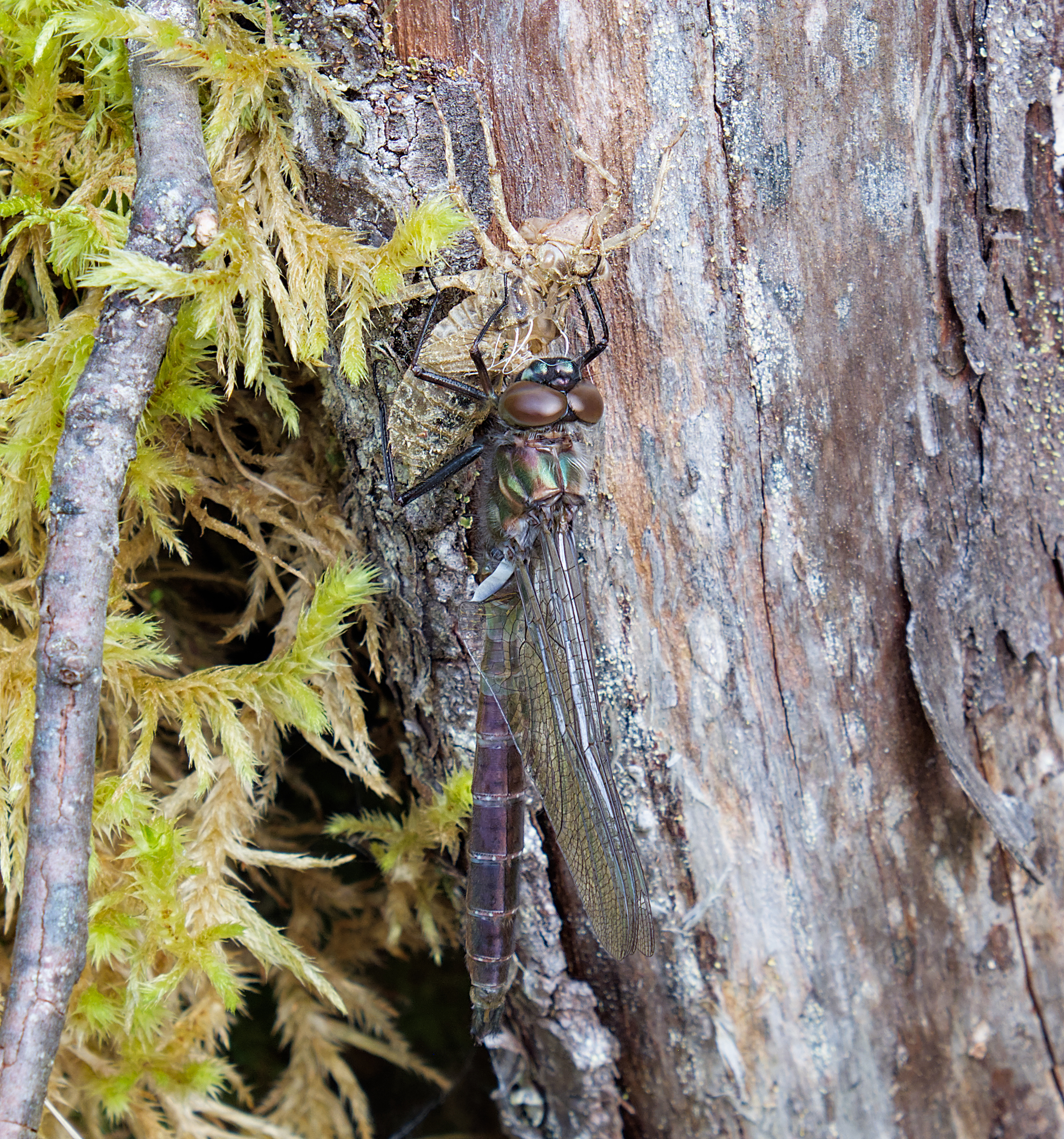
Male Somatochlora albicincta emerging from the nymph stage

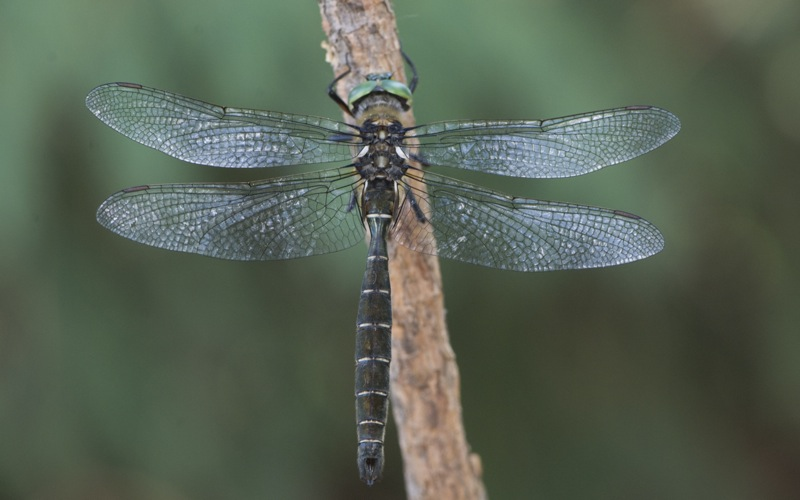
Ringed emerald, Somatochlora albicincta
