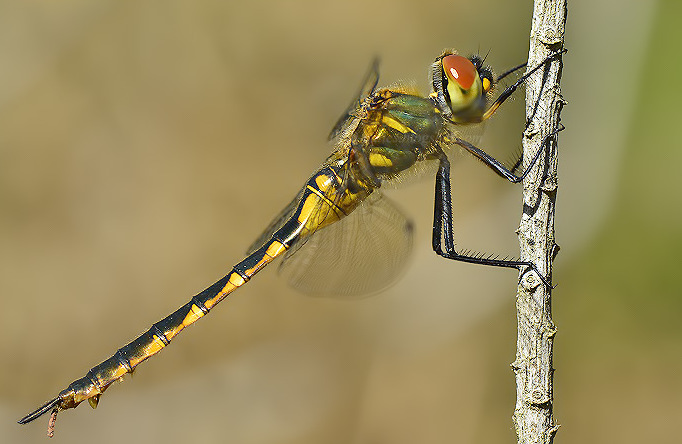
- Female Somatochlora flavomaculata

Scientific classification
- Kingdom: Animalia
- Phylum: Arthropoda
- Clade: Pancrustacea
- Class: Insecta
- Order: Odonata
- Suborder: Anisoptera
- Superfamily: Libelluloidea
- Family: Corduliidae
- Subfamily: Corduliinae
- Genus: Somatochlora; Selys, 1871

= Somatochlora =

Somatochlora Temporal range: Oligocene - Present

Genus of dragonflies

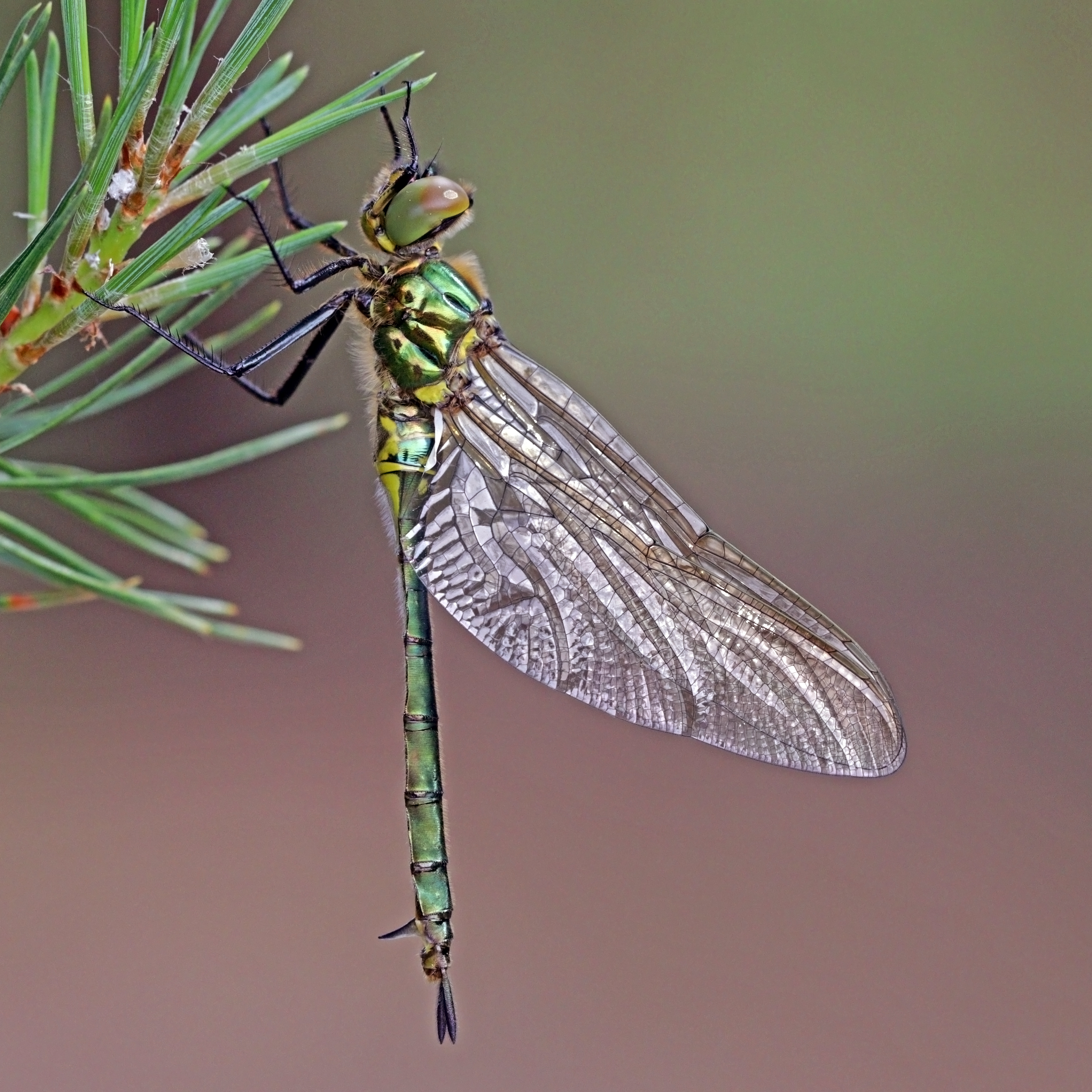
Teneral Somatochlora metallica female

Somatochlora, or the striped emeralds, is a genus of dragonflies in the family Corduliidae with 42 described species found across the Northern Hemisphere.

== Taxonomy ==
The name Somatochlora is derived from the Greek soma (body) and khloros (green). The species Corduliochlora borisi was formerly treated as a member of Somatochlora.

A 2025 article in Systematic Entomology examined the phylogeny of Somatochlora and proposed the following phylogenetic tree:

Phylogenetics of Somatochlora

After Goodman et al. 2025

- - - - - Somatochlora kennedyi
        - - Somatochlora daviesi
          - Somatochlora georgiana
      - - Somatochlora arctica
        - - Somatochlora franklini
          - - Somatochlora forcipata
            - - Somatochlora dido
              - Somatochlora incurvata
    - - Somatochlora brevicincta
      - - - Somatochlora cingulata
          - - Somatochlora alpestris
            - Somatochlora sahlbergi
        - - - Somatochlora septentrionalis
            - Somatochlora whitehousei
          - - Somatochlora semicircularis
            - - Somatochlora albicincta
              - Somatochlora hudsonica
  - - - Somatochlora graeseri
      - - Somatochlora shanxiensis
        - Somatochlora uchidai
    - - Somatochlora margarita
      - - Somatochlora filosa
        - - Somatochlora minor
          - - - - Somatochlora ensigera
                - Somatochlora linearis
              - - Somatochlora hineana
                - - Somatochlora tenebrosa
                  - - Somatochlora calverti
                    - Somatochlora provocans
            - - - Somatochlora williamsoni
                - - Somatochlora elongata
                  - Somatochlora walshii
              - - Somatochlora flavomaculata
                - - - Somatochlora clavata
                    - Somatochlora viridiaenea
                  - - Somatochlora exuberata
                    - - Somatochlora metallica
                      - Somatochlora meridionalis

== Description ==
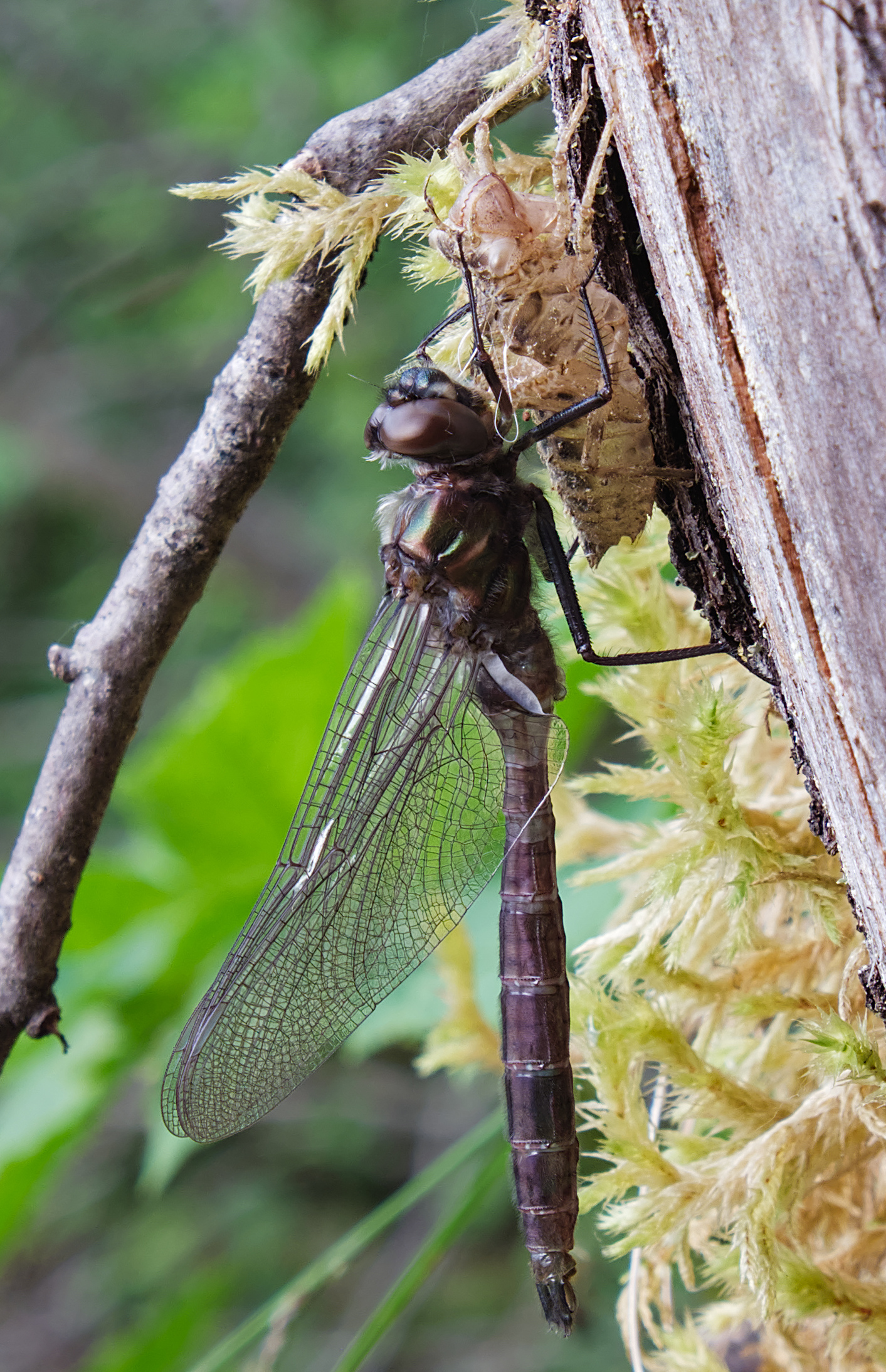
Newly emerged male S. albicincta on its exuvia

Members of this genus are medium-sized dragonflies with dark bodies and a metallic green lustre. The eyes are brilliant green, and many species have dull to bright yellow markings on the thorax and/or abdomen. The abdomens of males are distinctive, with the first two segments bulbous-shaped, the third constricted, and the rest of the abdomen club-shaped with a straight ending. Females have abdomens with straighter sides. Identifying these dragonflies to species can be difficult. The cerci of males, on the tip of the abdomen, are distinctively shaped in each species, as are the subgenital plates on female abdomens. In some species, the subgenital plate is large and projecting, and is used as a "pseudo-ovipositor" for inserting eggs into a substrate.

== Distribution ==
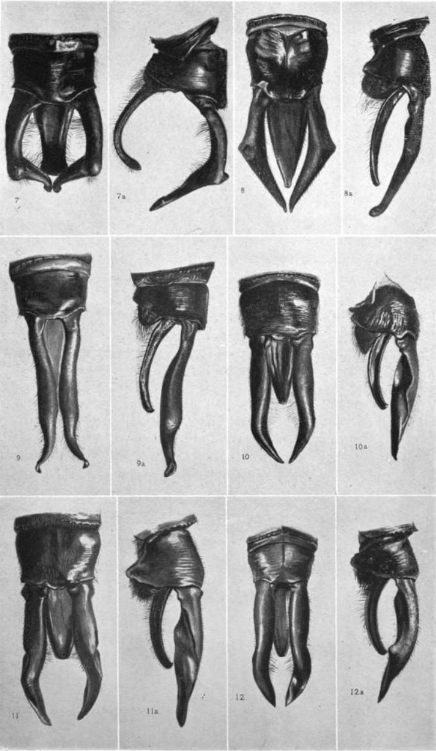
Illustration showing male cerci of several species of Somatochlora

Somatochlora species are found across the Northern Hemisphere in Europe, Asia, and North America, with some species extending into arctic regions north of the treeline. Some species extend south to Spain, Turkey, northern India, northern Vietnam, Taiwan and the Southern United States. At least one species, S. semicircularis, may be found at altitudes up to 3,700 m (12,100 ft). In North America, most species live in the boreal forest and/or the Appalachian Mountains.

== Life history ==
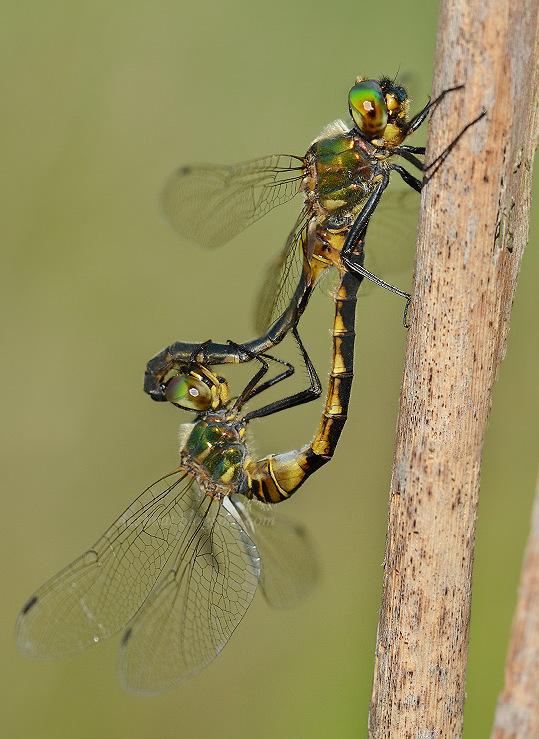
Mating pair of Somatochlora flavomaculata

Somatochlora larvae typically live in bogs, fens, and/or forest streams, with some species found in lakes. They do not occur in marshy ponds. Many species are limited to very specific habitats and are rare and local. Adults feed in flight and may occur at some distance from their breeding habitat in mixed swarms.

== Species ==
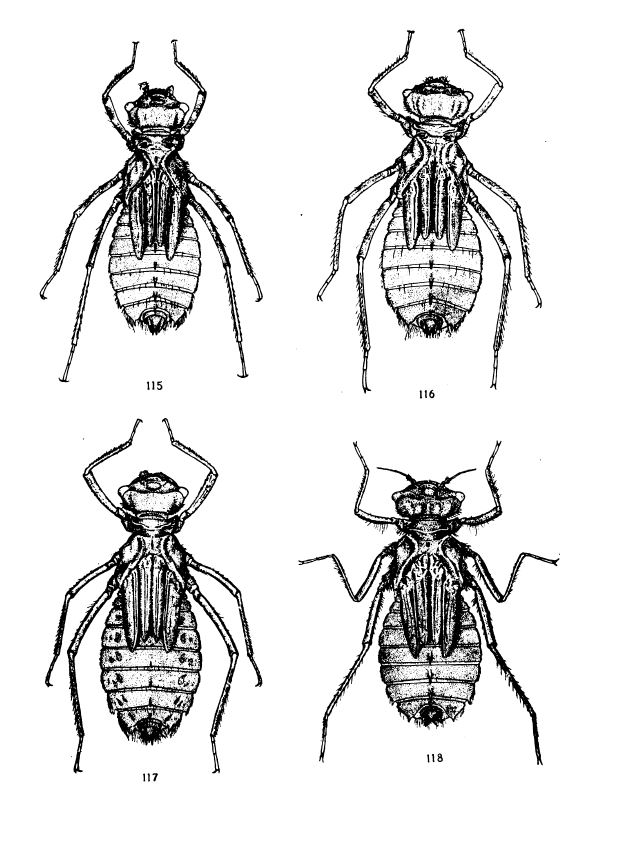
Larvae of several Somatochlora species

Somatochlora is the most diverse group within the Corduliidae. Of the 42 described species listed below, 25 are North American, 16 are Eurasian, and one is circumboreal (S. sahlbergi). Two additional fossil species have been assigned to this genus: S. brisaci, based on a wing from the Upper Miocene in France, and S. oregonica, based on two wings from the Oligocene in Oregon.

Image	Species	Common name(s)	Distribution
	Somatochlora albicincta (Burmeister, 1839)	ringed emerald	Canada, northern United States
	Somatochlora alpestris (Selys, 1840)	alpine emerald	Europe and Asia
	Somatochlora arctica (Zetterstedt, 1840)	northern emerald	Europe and Asia
	Somatochlora brevicincta Robert, 1954	Quebec emerald	Canada, northern United States
	Somatochlora calverti Williamson & Gloyd, 1933	Calvert's emerald	southeastern United States
	Somatochlora cingulata (Selys, 1871)	lake emerald	Canada, northern United States
	Somatochlora clavata Oguma, 1922		Japan and Korea
	Somatochlora daviesi Lieftinck, 1977		Bhutan, Nepal, and India
	Somatochlora dido Needham, 1930		China and Vietnam
	Somatochlora elongata (Scudder, 1866)	ski-tipped emerald, ski-tailed emerald	northeastern North America
	Somatochlora ensigera Martin, 1907	plains emerald	central North America
	Somatochlora exuberata Bartenev, 1910		Japan and eastern Russia
	Somatochlora filosa (Hagen, 1861)	fine-lined emerald	southeastern United States
	Somatochlora flavomaculata (Vander Linden, 1825)	yellow-spotted emerald	Europe
	Somatochlora forcipata (Scudder, 1866)	forcipate emerald	Canada, northern United States
	Somatochlora franklini (Selys, 1878)	delicate emerald	Canada, northern United States
	Somatochlora georgiana Walker, 1925	coppery emerald	eastern United States
	Somatochlora graeseri Selys, 1887		east Asia
	Somatochlora hineana Williamson, 1931	Hine's emerald	Ontario and midwest United States
	Somatochlora hudsonica (Hagen in Selys, 1871)	Hudsonian emerald	western and central Canada, northwestern United States
	Somatochlora incurvata Walker, 1918	incurvate emerald	northeastern North America
	Somatochlora kennedyi Walker, 1918	Kennedy's emerald	Canada, northeastern United States
	Somatochlora linearis (Hagen, 1861)	mocha emerald	eastern North America
	Somatochlora lingyinensis Zhou & Wa, 1979		Zhejiang
	Somatochlora margarita Donnelly, 1962	Texas emerald	Texas and Louisiana
	Somatochlora meridionalis Nielsen, 1935	Balkan emerald	southeastern Europe
	Somatochlora metallica (Vander Linden, 1825)	brilliant emerald	Europe
	Somatochlora minor Calvert, 1898	ocellated emerald	Canada, northern United States
	Somatochlora ozarkensis Bird, 1933	Ozark emerald	Arkansas, Kansas, Missouri and Oklahoma
	Somatochlora provocans Calvert, 1903	treetop emerald	southeastern United States
	Somatochlora sahlbergi Trybom, 1889	treeline emerald	northwestern Canada, Alaska, northern Russia, Scandinavia
	Somatochlora semicircularis (Selys, 1871)	mountain emerald	western North America
	Somatochlora septentrionalis (Hagen, 1861)	muskeg emerald	Canada
	Somatochlora shanxiensis Zhu & Zhang, 1999		Hubei, Shanxi
	Somatochlora shennong Zhang, Vogt & Cai, 2014		Guangxi, Hubei
	Somatochlora taiwana Inoue & Yokota 2001		Taiwan
	Somatochlora tenebrosa (Say, 1840)	clamp-tipped emerald	eastern North America
	Somatochlora uchidai Förster, 1909		Japan, China and Russia
	Somatochlora viridiaenea (Uhler, 1858)		Japan, eastern Russia
	Somatochlora walshii (Scudder, 1866)	brush-tipped emerald	Canada, northern United States
	Somatochlora whitehousei Walker, 1925	Whitehouse's emerald	Canada, northwestern United States
	Somatochlora williamsoni Walker, 1907	Williamson's emerald	eastern North America
