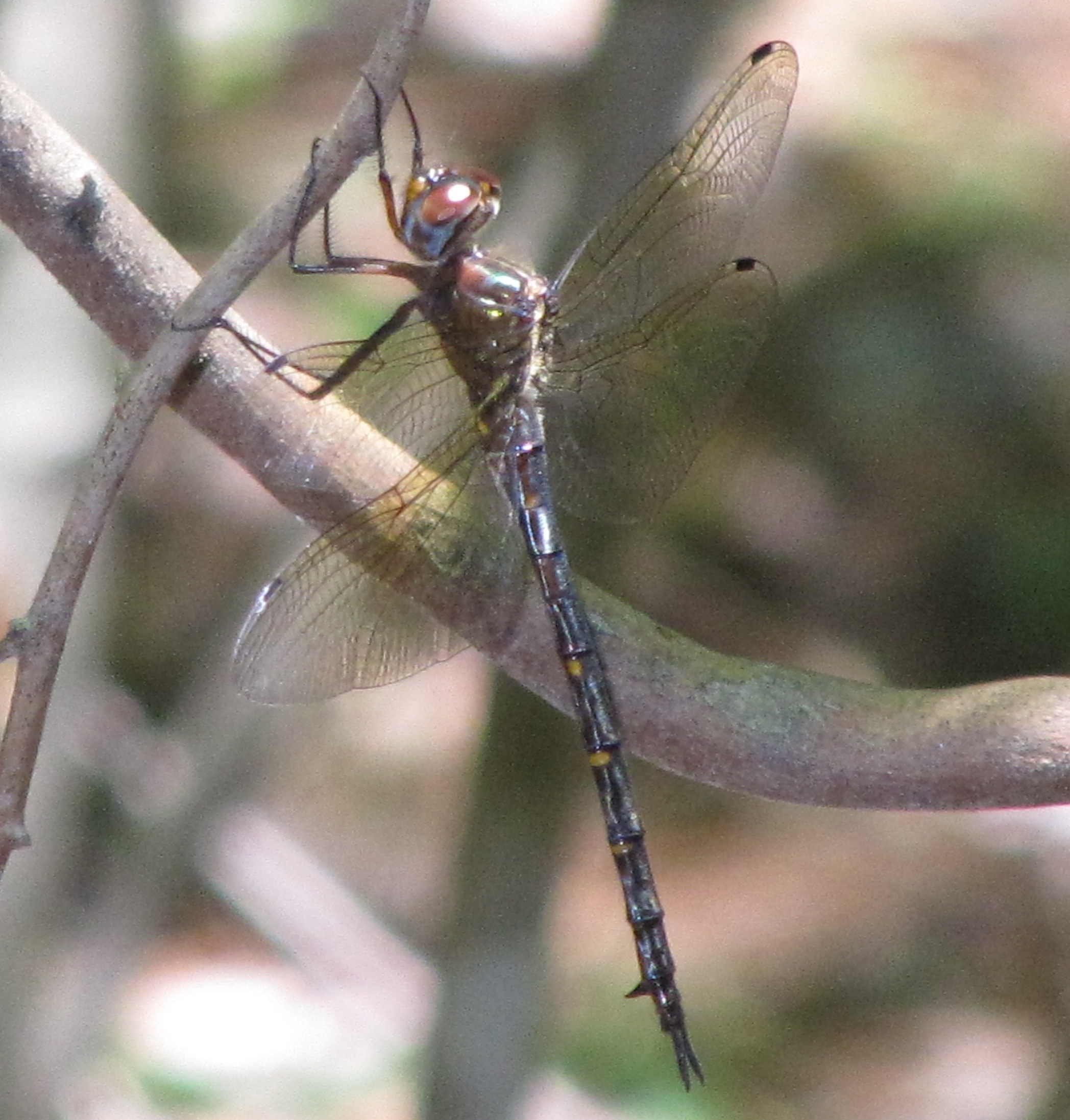

Conservation status
- Least Concern (IUCN 3.1)

Scientific classification
- Kingdom: Animalia
- Phylum: Arthropoda
- Clade: Pancrustacea
- Class: Insecta
- Order: Odonata
- Infraorder: Anisoptera
- Superfamily: Libelluloidea
- Family: Corduliidae
- Genus: Somatochlora
- Species: S. linearis

Binomial name
- Somatochlora linearis (Hagen, 1861)

Synonyms
- Cordulia linearis Hagen, 1861; Epitheca procera Selys, 1871; Somatochlora lateralis Needham, 1901 (lapsus)

= Somatochlora linearis =

Species of dragonfly

Somatochlora linearis, the mocha emerald, is a species of emerald dragonfly in the family Corduliidae. It is found in North America.

The IUCN conservation status of Somatochlora linearis is "LC", least concern, with no immediate threat to the species' survival. The population is stable.

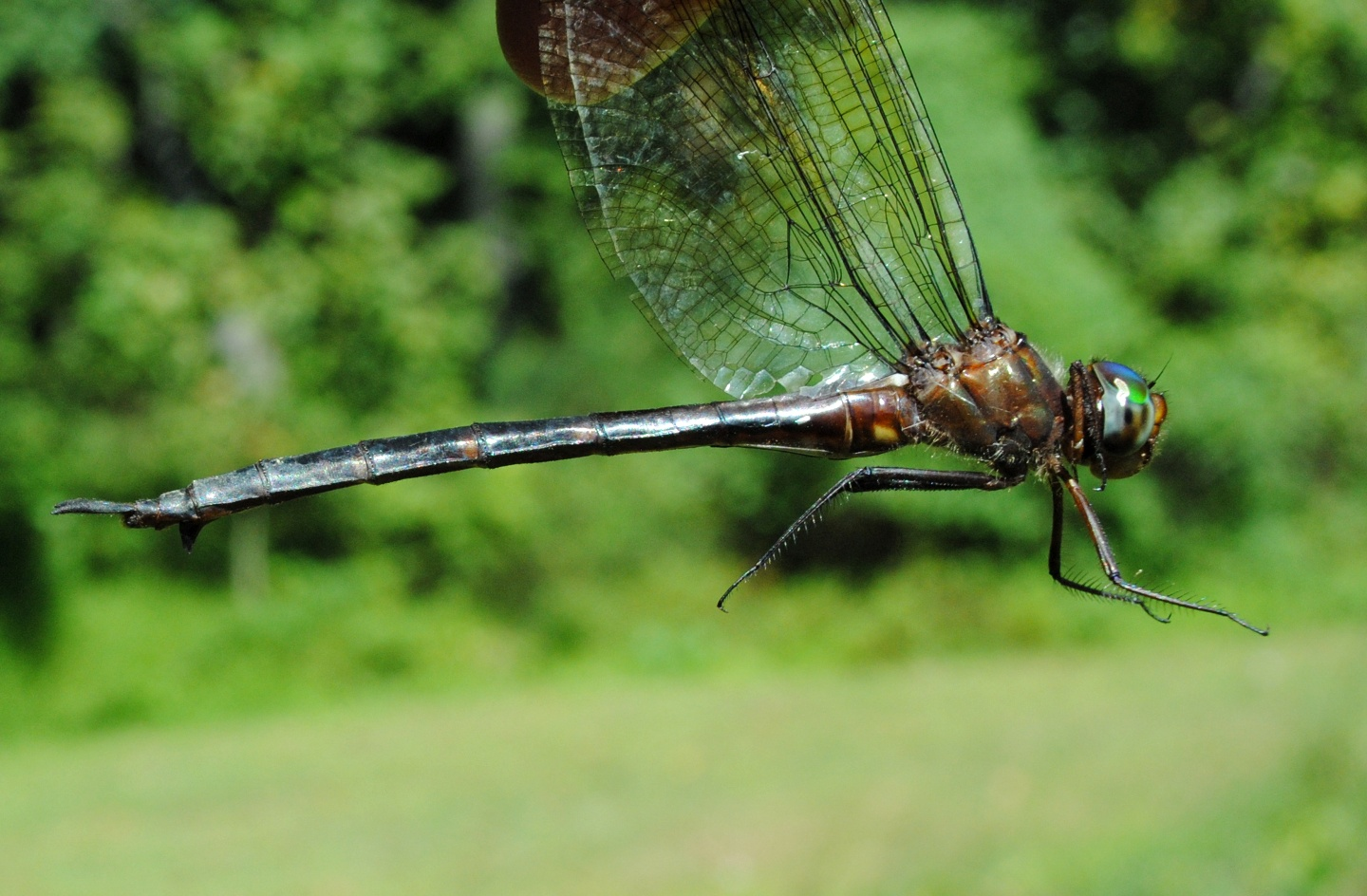
Mocha emerald, Somatochlora linearis
