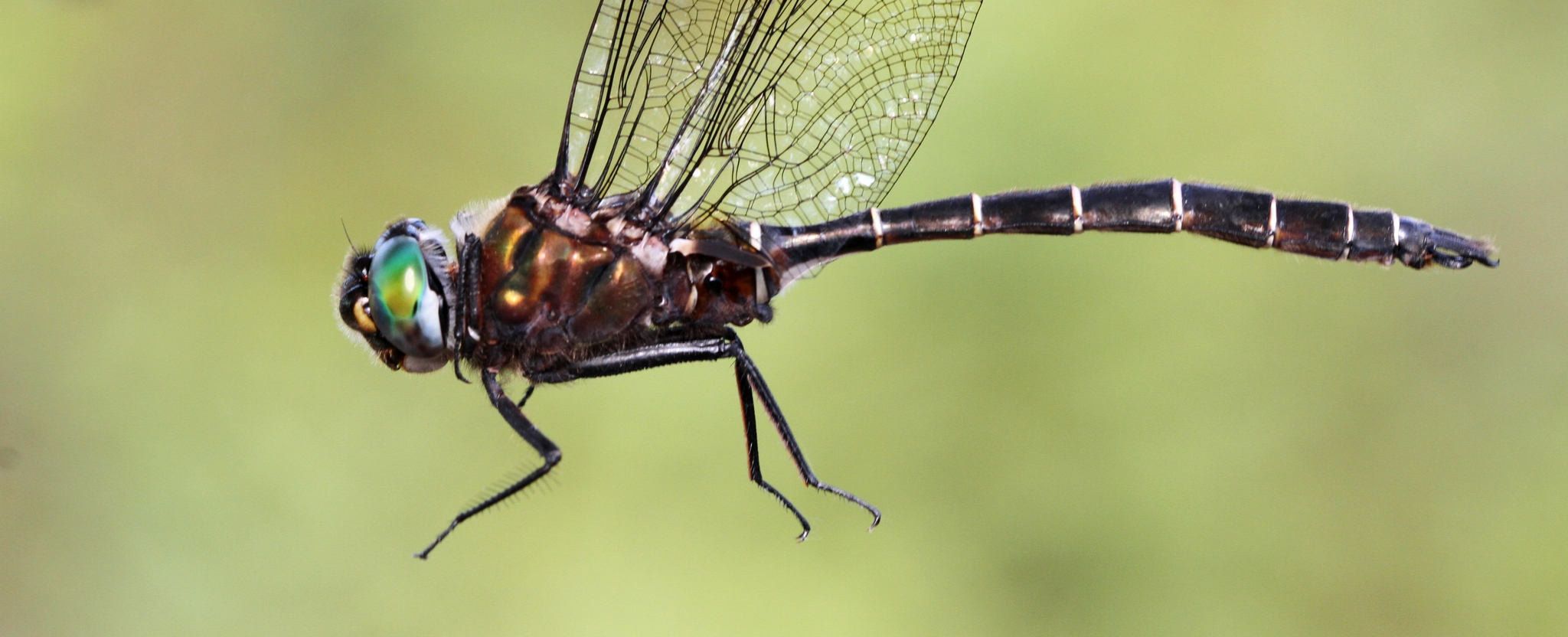

Conservation status
- Least Concern (IUCN 3.1)

Scientific classification
- Kingdom: Animalia
- Phylum: Arthropoda
- Clade: Pancrustacea
- Class: Insecta
- Order: Odonata
- Infraorder: Anisoptera
- Superfamily: Libelluloidea
- Family: Corduliidae
- Genus: Somatochlora
- Species: S. cingulata

Binomial name
- Somatochlora cingulata (Selys, 1871)

Synonyms
- Epitheca cingulata Selys, 1871

= Somatochlora cingulata =

Species of dragonfly

Somatochlora cingulata, the lake emerald, is a species of emerald dragonfly in the family Corduliidae. It is found in North America.

The IUCN conservation status of Somatochlora cingulata is "LC", least concern, with no immediate threat to the species' survival. The population is stable.
