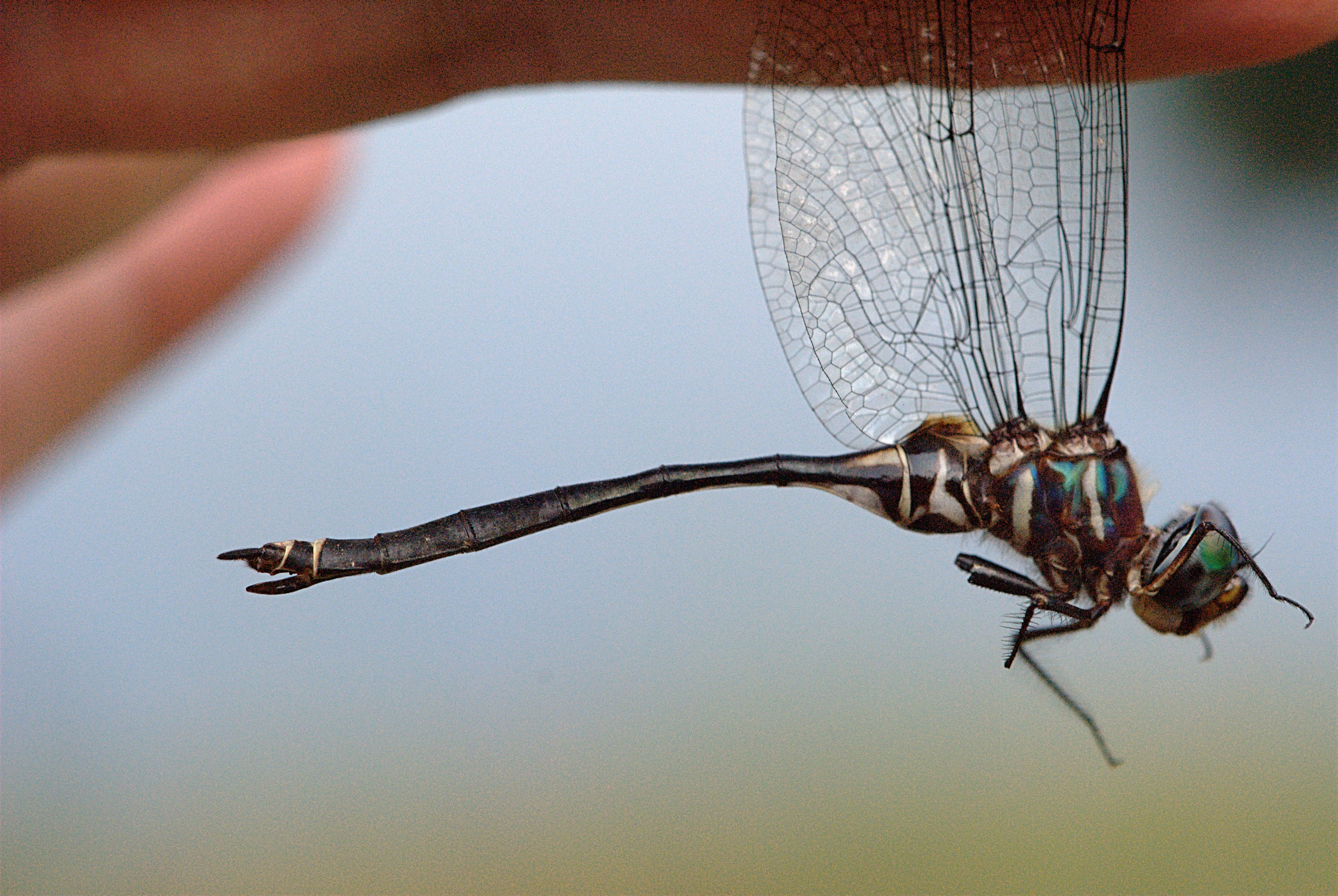

Conservation status
- Least Concern (IUCN 3.1)

Scientific classification
- Kingdom: Animalia
- Phylum: Arthropoda
- Clade: Pancrustacea
- Class: Insecta
- Order: Odonata
- Infraorder: Anisoptera
- Superfamily: Libelluloidea
- Family: Corduliidae
- Genus: Somatochlora
- Species: S. provocans

Binomial name
- Somatochlora provocans Calvert, 1903

= Somatochlora provocans =

Species of dragonfly

Somatochlora provocans, commonly known as the treetop emerald, is a species of emerald dragonfly in the family Corduliidae. It is found in North America.

The IUCN conservation status of Somatochlora provocans is "LC", least concern, with no immediate threat to the species' survival. The population is considered stable.
