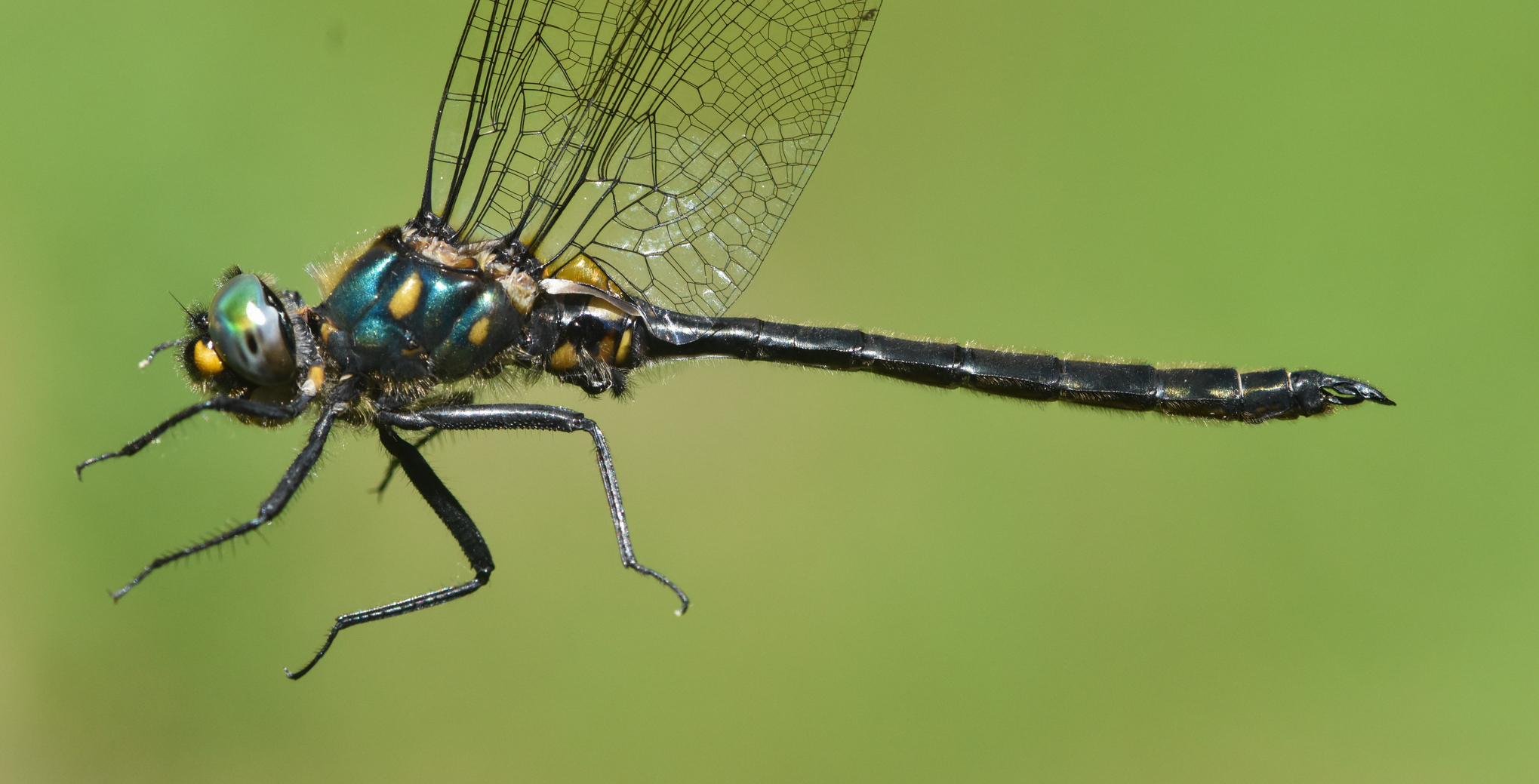

Conservation status
- Least Concern (IUCN 3.1)

Scientific classification
- Kingdom: Animalia
- Phylum: Arthropoda
- Clade: Pancrustacea
- Class: Insecta
- Order: Odonata
- Infraorder: Anisoptera
- Superfamily: Libelluloidea
- Family: Corduliidae
- Genus: Somatochlora
- Species: S. semicircularis

Binomial name
- Somatochlora semicircularis (Selys, 1871)

Synonyms
- Epitheca nasalis Selys, 1874; Epitheca semicircularis Selys, 1871

= Somatochlora semicircularis =

Species of dragonfly

Somatochlora semicircularis, the mountain emerald, is a species of emerald dragonfly in the family Corduliidae. It is found in North America.

The IUCN conservation status of Somatochlora semicircularis is "LC", least concern, with no immediate threat to the species' survival. The population is stable.
