= Somatochlora clavata =

Scientific classification
- Kingdom: Animalia
- Phylum: Arthropoda
- Clade: Pancrustacea
- Class: Insecta
- Order: Odonata
- Infraorder: Anisoptera
- Superfamily: Libelluloidea
- Family: Corduliidae
- Genus: Somatochlora
- Species: S. clavata

Binomial name
- Somatochlora clavata Oguma, 1913

Species of dragonfly

Somatochlora clavata is a species of dragonfly in the family Corduliidae. The species was described in 1913 by Dr. Kan Oguma based on specimens from Hokkaido. It has also been recorded in South Korea.
