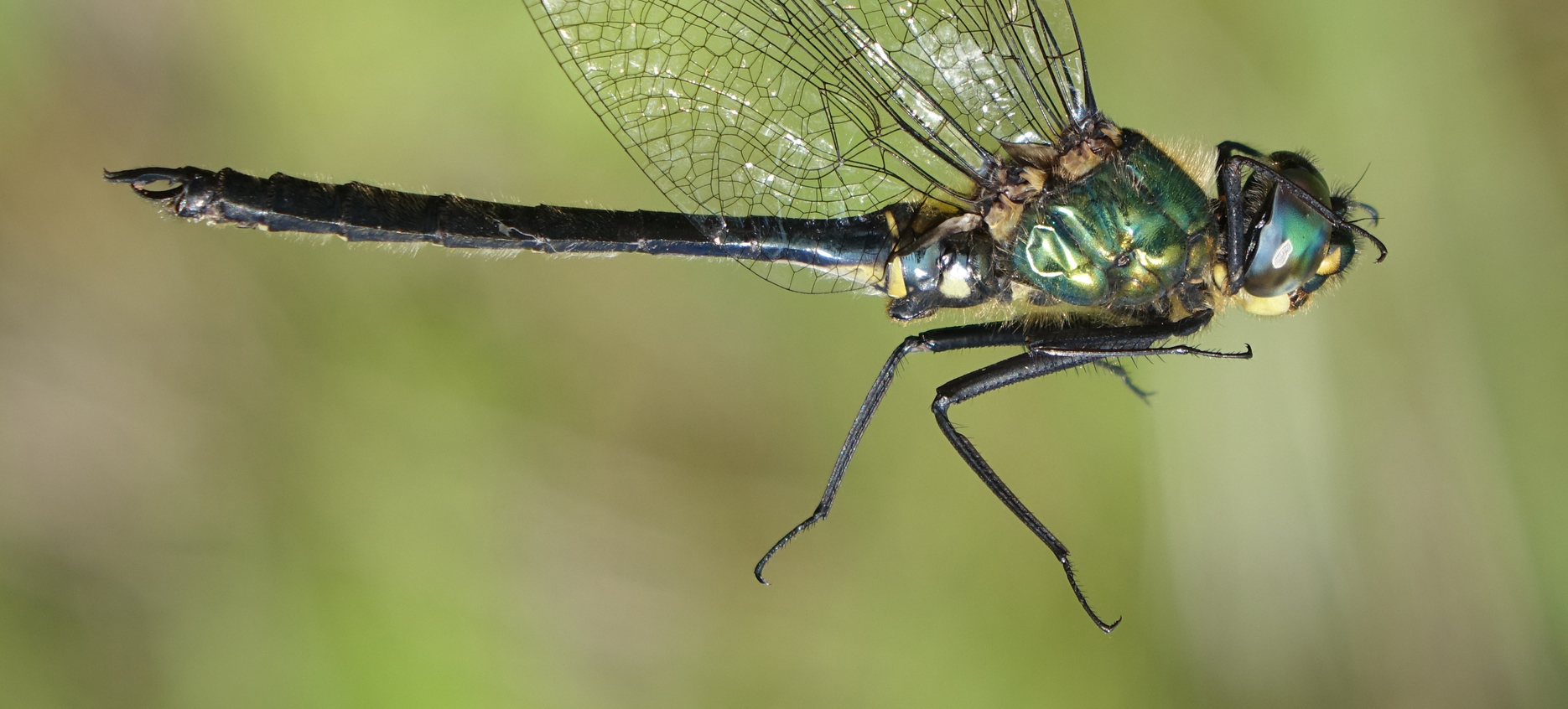

Conservation status
- Least Concern (IUCN 3.1) Global

- Data Deficient (IUCN 3.1) Europe

Scientific classification
- Kingdom: Animalia
- Phylum: Arthropoda
- Clade: Pancrustacea
- Class: Insecta
- Order: Odonata
- Infraorder: Anisoptera
- Superfamily: Libelluloidea
- Family: Corduliidae
- Genus: Somatochlora
- Species: S. graeseri

Binomial name
- Somatochlora graeseri Selys, 1887

Synonyms
- Somatochlora borealis Bartenev, 1910

= Somatochlora graeseri =

Species of dragonfly

Somatochlora graeseri is a species of dragonfly in the family Corduliidae. It is found in Asia, where it occurs in Japan (Hokkaido and northern Honshu), Korea, northern China, and Russia (Siberia west to foothills of the Ural Mountains).

== Subspecies ==
The species is split into two valid subspecies:

- Somatochlora graeseri aureola Oguma, 1913
- Somatochlora graeseri graeseri, the nominate subspecies
