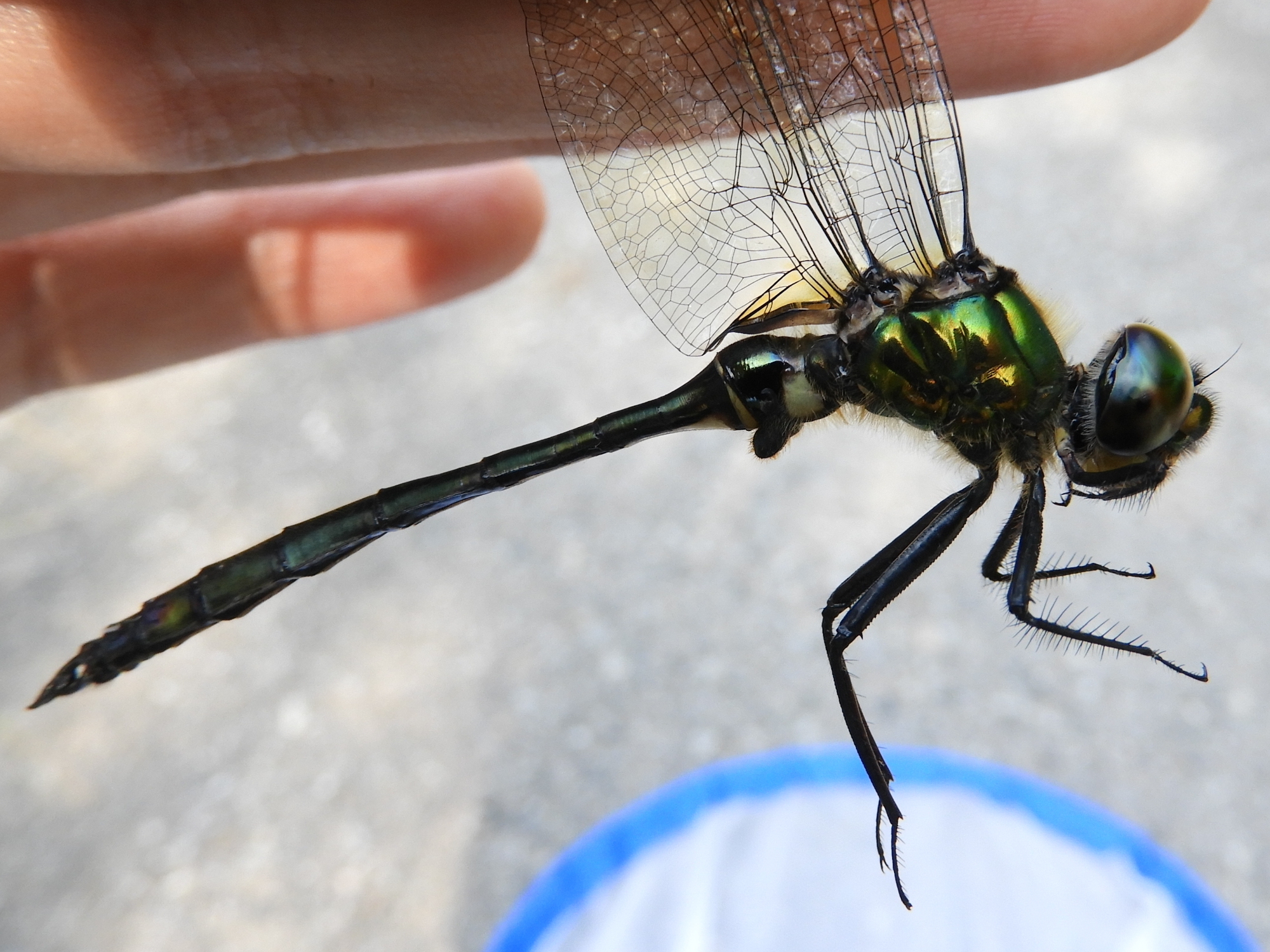

Conservation status
- Least Concern (IUCN 3.1)

Scientific classification
- Kingdom: Animalia
- Phylum: Arthropoda
- Clade: Pancrustacea
- Class: Insecta
- Order: Odonata
- Infraorder: Anisoptera
- Superfamily: Libelluloidea
- Family: Corduliidae
- Genus: Somatochlora
- Species: S. uchidai

Binomial name
- Somatochlora uchidai Förster, 1909

= Somatochlora uchidai =

Species of dragonfly

Somatochlora uchidai is a species of dragonfly in the family Corduliidae. It is native to Japan, China and Russia. It was described in 1909 by German entomologist Friedrich Förster based on specimens from Japan; the name uchidai refers to the Japanese odonate researcher Uchidas from whom Förster received the specimens.
