= Nesocordulia flavicauda =

Conservation status
- Data Deficient (IUCN 3.1)

Scientific classification
- Kingdom: Animalia
- Phylum: Arthropoda
- Clade: Pancrustacea
- Class: Insecta
- Order: Odonata
- Infraorder: Anisoptera
- Superfamily: Libelluloidea
- Family: Idomacromiidae
- Genus: Nesocordulia
- Species: N. flavicauda

Binomial name
- Nesocordulia flavicauda McLachlan, 1882

Species of dragonfly

Nesocordulia flavicauda, the yellow-tailed knifetail, is a species of dragonfly in the family Idomacromiidae. It is native to southeastern Madagascar, where it inhabits forested freshwater habitats. It is the type species of the genus Nesocordulia, which was established by McLachlan in 1882 for the species.

== Description ==
Nesocordulia flavicauda is a medium-sized dragonfly with a metallic green body marked with bright lemon-yellow on the thorax and abdomen. The wings are transparent with dense venation, and the legs are long and slender.

Males have a cylindrical abdomen that becomes broadened towards the tip and bears pale yellow appendages. The species is distinguished from other members of the genus by its characteristic abdominal markings and the form of the male abdominal appendages.

== Distribution and habitat ==
Nesocordulia flavicauda is endemic to southeastern Madagascar, where it has been recorded from forested freshwater habitats in the vicinity of Tôlanaro. Like other members of the genus, it is associated with streams and rivers flowing through native forest.

Little is known of its ecology. Adults are rarely encountered, and the immature stages have not been described.

== Taxonomic history ==
Nesocordulia flavicauda was described by Robert McLachlan in 1882 from Madagascar. In the same publication he established the genus Nesocordulia for the species, considering it intermediate between Neocordulia and Oxygastra but sufficiently distinct to warrant a separate genus.

F. C. Fraser (1956) redescribed the species in his revision of the Madagascan members of the genus, refining its diagnosis and comparing it with the other species then recognised. Bernard and colleagues (2025) subsequently revised the genus, confirming Nesocordulia flavicauda as the type species and providing a modern redescription based on additional material.

== Conservation ==
Nesocordulia flavicauda is classified as Data Deficient on the IUCN Red List. Although the species is endemic to Madagascar, too little is known about its distribution, population size, ecology and potential threats to assess its risk of extinction reliably.

== Etymology ==
The generic name Nesocordulia is derived from the Greek νῆσος (nēsos, "island") and the genus name Cordulia. McLachlan chose the name to reflect the insular distribution of the genus on Madagascar and its relationship to Cordulia.

The species name flavicauda is derived from the Latin flavus ("yellow") and cauda ("tail"), meaning "yellow-tailed". McLachlan almost certainly chose the name to emphasise the extensive yellow colouration of the terminal abdominal segments (S7–10), a feature that distinguishes the species from others in the genus.
