= Idomacromia lieftincki =

Conservation status
- Least Concern (IUCN 3.1)

Scientific classification
- Kingdom: Animalia
- Phylum: Arthropoda
- Clade: Pancrustacea
- Class: Insecta
- Order: Odonata
- Infraorder: Anisoptera
- Superfamily: Libelluloidea
- Family: Idomacromiidae
- Genus: Idomacromia
- Species: I. lieftincki

Binomial name
- Idomacromia lieftincki Legrand, 1984

Species of dragonfly

Idomacromia lieftincki, the lesser shadowcruiser, is a species of dragonfly in the family Idomacromiidae. It is found in the tropical forests of western and central Africa, where it inhabits shaded rainforest streams. It was described from Gabon in 1984 and is the second recognised species of the genus Idomacromia.

== Description ==
Idomacromia lieftincki is a small dragonfly about 46 mm long with a dark metallic green body, clear wings and relatively short legs. The thorax bears pale markings and the abdomen is dark with a pale marking on the seventh segment.

Only the male has been described. The species is smaller than Idomacromia proavita and differs in the shape of the male terminal appendages and reproductive structures, features that distinguish it from the only other known species of the genus at the time of its description.

== Distribution and habitat ==
Idomacromia lieftincki is found in the tropical forests of western and central Africa. It was first described from Makokou in northeastern Gabon and has subsequently been recorded from the Mount Nimba region of Guinea and Côte d'Ivoire, southeastern Senegal, and probably eastern Liberia.

The species inhabits shaded rainforest streams and may be associated with hilly or montane forest terrain. Although known from relatively few records, its scattered distribution probably reflects the difficulty of detecting this elusive dragonfly rather than genuine rarity.

The type specimen was reared from a larva collected in a forest stream near Makokou, where the larvae of Idomacromia lieftincki and Idomacromia proavita occurred together.

== Taxonomic history ==
Idomacromia lieftincki was described by Jean Legrand in 1984 from a single male reared from a larva collected in a forest stream near Makokou in northeastern Gabon. While studying dragonfly larvae from the area, Legrand initially believed the unusual larva belonged to Idomacromia proavita. After it emerged as an adult, he recognised it as a previously unknown species and described it as the second member of the genus.

Subsequent records from West Africa greatly extended the known range of the species, demonstrating that it is more widespread than first believed. Molecular phylogenetic studies published in 2025 confirmed Idomacromia as a member of the family Idomacromiidae and recovered Idomacromia lieftincki as the sister species of Nesocordulia, rather than Idomacromia proavita, suggesting that the genus may require further taxonomic study.

== Conservation ==
Idomacromia lieftincki is classified as Least Concern on the IUCN Red List. Although it is known from relatively few records, its scattered distribution across western and central Africa suggests that it is probably overlooked rather than genuinely rare.

The principal threat to the species is the loss and degradation of rainforest habitat through agriculture and timber extraction.

== Etymology ==
The generic name Idomacromia presumably combines Idionyx and Macromia. When establishing the genus in 1896, Ferdinand Karsch regarded it as sharing characteristics with both genera while differing sufficiently from each to warrant recognition as a distinct genus.

The specimen name lieftincki is an eponym honoring the Dutch odonatologist Maurits Lieftinck. In the original description, Jean Legrand dedicated the species to him "in admiration and gratitude" for his scientific work and personal kindness.
