= Idomacromia =

Scientific classification
- Kingdom: Animalia
- Phylum: Arthropoda
- Clade: Pancrustacea
- Class: Insecta
- Order: Odonata
- Suborder: Anisoptera
- Superfamily: Libelluloidea
- Family: Idomacromiidae
- Genus: Idomacromia; Karsch, 1896

Species
- Idomacromia jillianae; Idomacromia lieftincki; Idomacromia proavita

Genus of dragonflies

Idomacromia, the Central African emeralds, is a genus of dragonflies in the family Idomacromiidae. The three described species are found in the tropical forests of western, central and eastern Africa, from Guinea and Cameroon to Uganda. Adults are rarely encountered and remain among the least-known African dragonflies, with much of their ecology still poorly understood.

The genus was established by Ferdinand Karsch in 1896 for Idomacromia proavita, which he regarded as distinct from the superficially similar genus Macromia because of its combination of wing venation, body form and male appendages. Molecular studies published in 2025 confirmed Idomacromia as one of five genera comprising the family Idomacromiidae.

== Description ==
Idomacromia are medium-sized dragonflies with dark metallic green to blue-green bodies and clear wings. They are distinguished by a compact, robust build, relatively short legs and a combination of wing venation characters that separates them from superficially similar genera such as Macromia.

The adults are fast-flying forest dragonflies that are seldom encountered. Males are known for only two of the three species, while Idomacromia jillianae remains known solely from females. Females possess a conspicuous ovipositor, an unusual feature within the family that is shared with only a few related dragonflies.

== Distribution and habitat ==
Species of Idomacromia are distributed across tropical Africa, from the Upper Guinean forests of West Africa through the Congo Basin to the montane forests of southwestern Uganda. They inhabit shaded forest streams and rivers, where the metallic green adults are rarely encountered and probably under-recorded because they spend much of their time in dense rainforest.

Little is known of their biology. Males have been observed patrolling small shaded streams in deep forest, flying in a rapid, erratic manner, while females oviposit into submerged or waterlogged wood using their elongated ovipositor. Larvae inhabit forest streams, but remain poorly known.

== Taxonomic history ==
Idomacromia was established by Ferdinand Karsch in 1896 for Idomacromia proavita, which he considered sufficiently distinct from the superficially similar genus Macromia to warrant a new genus based on differences in wing venation, body proportions and male appendages.

For much of the twentieth century the genus was regarded as an isolated member of the family Corduliidae and was placed in the subfamily Idomacromiinae by Tillyard and Fraser in 1940. The genus remained poorly known until Dijkstra and Kisakye described Idomacromia jillianae from Uganda in 2004, extending its known range into East Africa.

Following molecular studies in the early 21st century, the relationships of Idomacromia and several other genera of libelluloid dragonflies remained unresolved. Dijkstra and colleagues (2013) therefore treated the genus as incertae sedis within Libelluloidea, preferring to await additional evidence rather than assign it to an existing family prematurely.

Molecular phylogenetic studies published in 2025 confirmed Idomacromia as one of five genera comprising the family Idomacromiidae, with evidence suggesting that it is most closely related to Nesocordulia.

== Species ==
The following species are currently placed in Idomacromia:

- Idomacromia jillianae Dijkstra & Kisakye, 2004 (Jill's Shadowcruiser)
- Idomacromia lieftincki Legrand, 1984
- Idomacromia proavita Karsch, 1896

== Etymology ==
The generic name Idomacromia presumably combines Idionyx and Macromia. When establishing the genus in 1896, Ferdinand Karsch regarded it as sharing characteristics with both genera while differing sufficiently from each to warrant recognition as a distinct genus.
