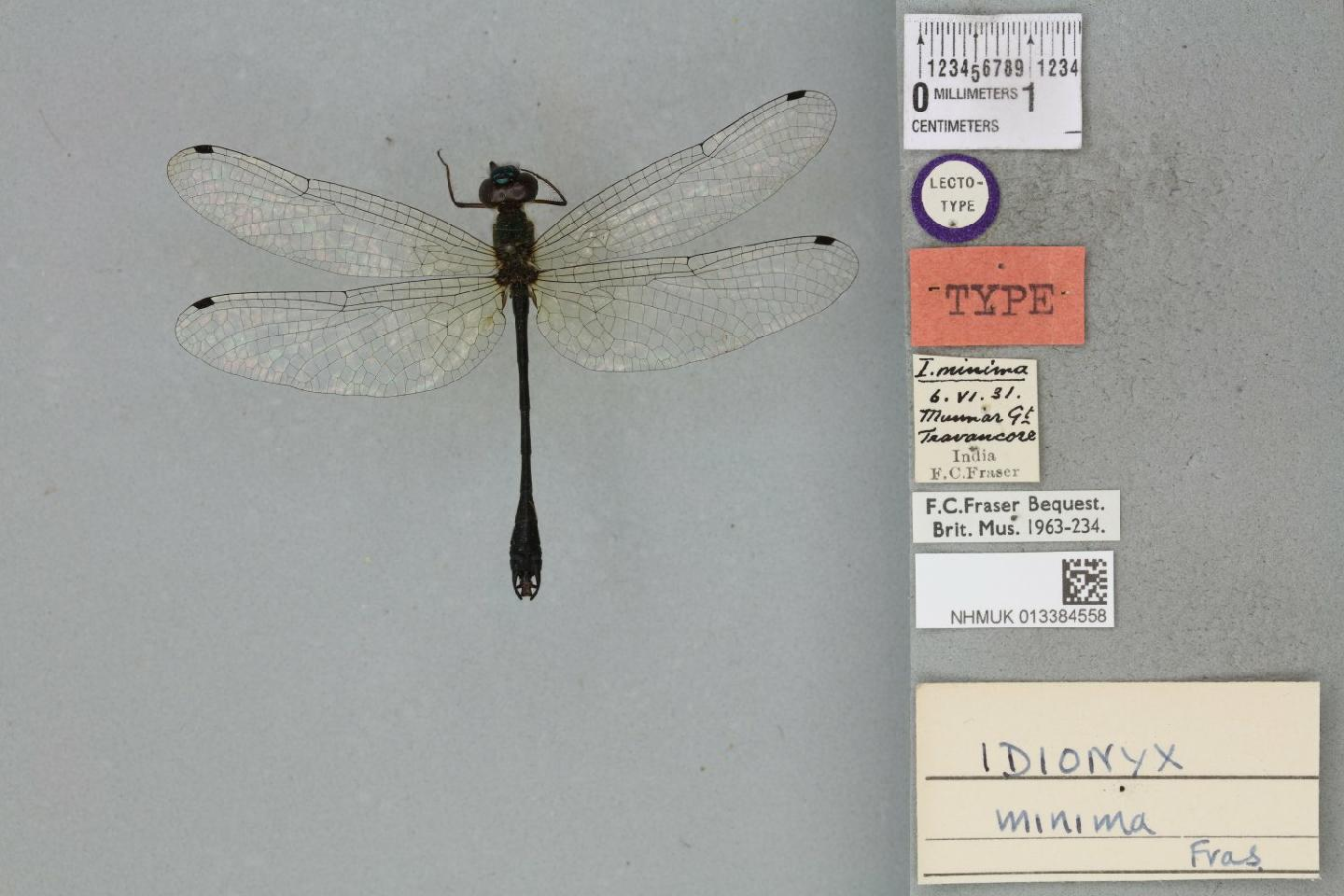

Conservation status
- Data Deficient (IUCN 3.1)

Scientific classification
- Kingdom: Animalia
- Phylum: Arthropoda
- Clade: Pancrustacea
- Class: Insecta
- Order: Odonata
- Infraorder: Anisoptera
- Superfamily: Libelluloidea
- Family: Idionychidae
- Genus: Idionyx
- Species: I. minimus

Binomial name
- Idionyx minimus Fraser, 1931

Synonyms
- Idionyx minima Fraser, 1931 (Missp.)

= Idionyx minimus =

Species of dragonfly

Idionyx minimus is a species of dragonfly in the family Idionychidae. It is known only from the Western Ghats of Kerala, India.

== Description and habitat ==
It is a small dragonfly with emerald-green eyes. Its thorax is metallic green, changing on the lower parts of sides to metallic blue. The humeral stripe absent, but there is a narrow oblique citron-yellow stripe on each side and a similar stripe on the posterior border of metepimeron. Abdomen is black. Segment 10 strongly keeled; but without a dorsal spine. Anal appendages are black.

Fraser (1936) states that he took a few specimens of both sexes flying among tea off the Munnar Ghat road during June. It is the smallest species of the genus and is closely related to Idionyx saffronatus and to Idionyx galeatus by the shape of the anal appendages, and especially that of the superiors, with the characteristic row of minute teeth beneath near the base. The glossy jet-black labium will serve to distinguish it at once from all of these species.

== See also ==
- List of odonates of India
- List of odonata of Kerala
