= Nesocordulia coloratissima =

Scientific classification
- Kingdom: Animalia
- Phylum: Arthropoda
- Clade: Pancrustacea
- Class: Insecta
- Order: Odonata
- Infraorder: Anisoptera
- Superfamily: Libelluloidea
- Family: Idomacromiidae
- Genus: Nesocordulia
- Species: N. coloratissima

Binomial name
- Nesocordulia coloratissima Bernard, Daraż, Ravelomanana & Dijkstra, 2025

Species of dragonfly

Nesocordulia coloratissima, the flame-tipped knifetail, is a species of dragonfly in the family Idomacromiidae. It is endemic to western and south-central Madagascar, where it inhabits dry forest landscapes. It was one of six new species described during a 2025 revision of the genus Nesocordulia.

== Description ==
Nesocordulia coloratissima is a relatively small dragonfly about 42–46 mm long. It is the most brightly coloured member of the genus, with a striking combination of black, rusty brown, yellow and white, together with metallic green, blue, bronze and violet reflections.

The thorax bears large yellow markings, while the abdomen is black with bright yellow markings on the first seven segments and rusty-brown terminal segments. The wings are lightly tinted amber, especially towards the front and tips, and the male has distinctive white terminal appendages.

== Distribution and habitat ==
Nesocordulia coloratissima is endemic to western and south-central Madagascar. Most records are from and around Isalo National Park in the Ihorombe Region, with an additional record from Kirindy Forest in the Menabe Region about 280 km to the northwest.

It is the only known species of Nesocordulia that occurs naturally in the dry western regions of Madagascar, where it inhabits the Madagascar Succulent Woodlands ecoregion. Adults have been collected resting in trees some distance from water, and, together with Nesocordulia evanida, it is one of only two species in the genus known to persist in human-modified habitats.

== Taxonomic history ==
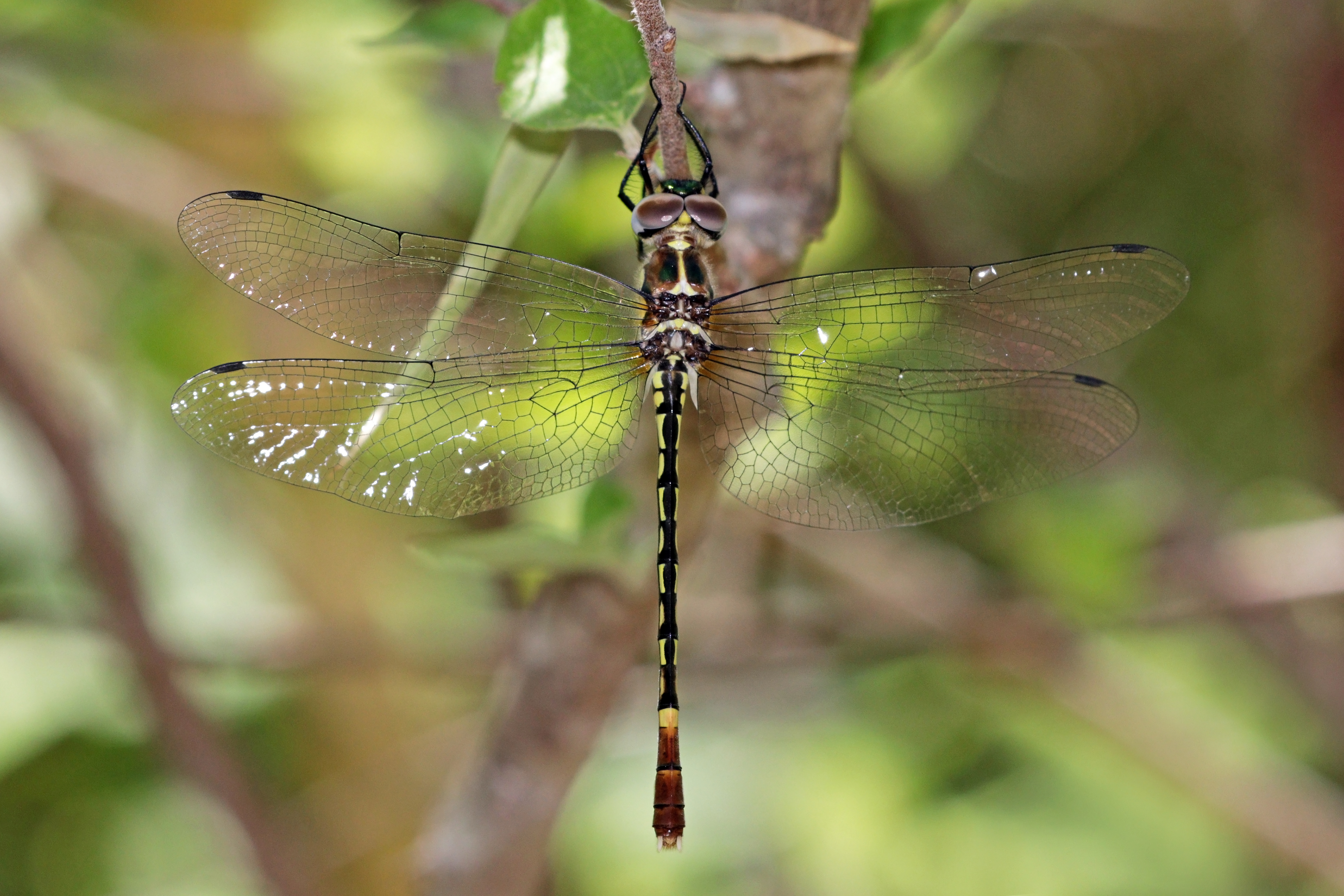
Female Nesocordulia coloratissima. This specimen was originally identified as Nesocordulia malgassica.

Nesocordulia coloratissima was described by Bernard, Daraż, Ravelomanana and Dijkstra in 2025 as one of six new species recognised during a comprehensive revision of the genus Nesocordulia. The revision combined the study of historical museum specimens with recently collected material and photographic observations, revealing that several populations previously assigned to other species represented distinct taxa.

During the revision, photographs that had previously been identified as Nesocordulia malgassica were shown to represent Nesocordulia coloratissima instead, extending knowledge of the species' appearance and distribution.

== Etymology ==
The generic name Nesocordulia is derived from the Greek νῆσος (nēsos, "island") and the genus name Cordulia. McLachlan chose the name to reflect the insular distribution of the genus on Madagascar and its relationship to Cordulia.

The species name coloratissima is a feminine Latin adjective formed from colorata ("coloured") with the superlative suffix -issima, meaning "the most colourful". Bernard and colleagues chose the name because it is the most vividly coloured species in the genus, displaying a striking combination of black, rusty brown, yellow and white together with metallic green, blue, golden, bronze and violet reflections.
