= Idomacromia jillianae =

Conservation status
- Data Deficient (IUCN 3.1)

Scientific classification
- Kingdom: Animalia
- Phylum: Arthropoda
- Clade: Pancrustacea
- Class: Insecta
- Order: Odonata
- Infraorder: Anisoptera
- Superfamily: Libelluloidea
- Family: Idomacromiidae
- Genus: Idomacromia
- Species: I. jillianae

Binomial name
- Idomacromia jillianae Dijkstra & Kisakye, 2004

Species of dragonfly

Idomacromia jillianae, commonly known as Jill's shadowcruiser, is a species of dragonfly in the family Idomacromiidae. It is known only from Bwindi Impenetrable National Park in southwestern Uganda, where it inhabits montane rainforest streams. It is the easternmost known representative of the genus Idomacromia.

== Description ==
Idomacromia jillianae is a medium-sized dragonfly about 49 mm long with a metallic green body, clear wings and a broad-winged appearance. The face is yellow and brown with metallic green markings, while the thorax is largely metallic green with yellow on the underside. The abdomen is predominantly dark with metallic reflections and pale yellow-brown markings on the basal segments.

Only females are known. They are distinguished from other species of Idomacromia by their relatively short pterostigmata and the distinctive shape of the ovipositor.

== Distribution and habitat ==
Idomacromia jillianae is known only from Bwindi Impenetrable National Park in southwestern Uganda, where it has been recorded at elevations of approximately 1,500–2,100 m. The species inhabits montane rainforest streams flowing through dense forest.

Little is known of its biology. Both known females were collected flying close to shaded rocky streams bordered by dense vegetation, one during overcast conditions late in the morning and the other resting among branches overhanging a forest stream. The authors suggested that the species may be endemic to the Albertine Rift highlands and could also occur in neighbouring Rwanda and the eastern Democratic Republic of the Congo.

== Taxonomic history ==
Idomacromia jillianae was described by Klaas-Douwe B. Dijkstra and John Joseph Kisakye in 2004 from two females collected in Bwindi Impenetrable National Park in southwestern Uganda. It was the first record of the genus Idomacromia from East Africa, extending its known range beyond the tropical forests of West and Central Africa.

Although the authors considered describing a species from females alone undesirable, they concluded that the rarity of Idomacromia made it preferable to publish the discovery rather than wait for the unknown male, which might not be found for many years. They noted that only one of the previously known species of Idomacromia had ever been described from a wild-caught adult male, highlighting the elusive nature of the genus.

== Etymology ==
The generic name Idomacromia presumably combines Idionyx and Macromia. When establishing the genus in 1896, Ferdinand Karsch regarded it as sharing characteristics with both genera while differing sufficiently from each to warrant recognition as a distinct genus.

The species name jillianae honours the British odonatologist Jill Silsby, author of Dragonflies of the World (2001). Dijkstra and Kisakye named the species in recognition of her contributions to the study of dragonflies and her widely used handbook.
