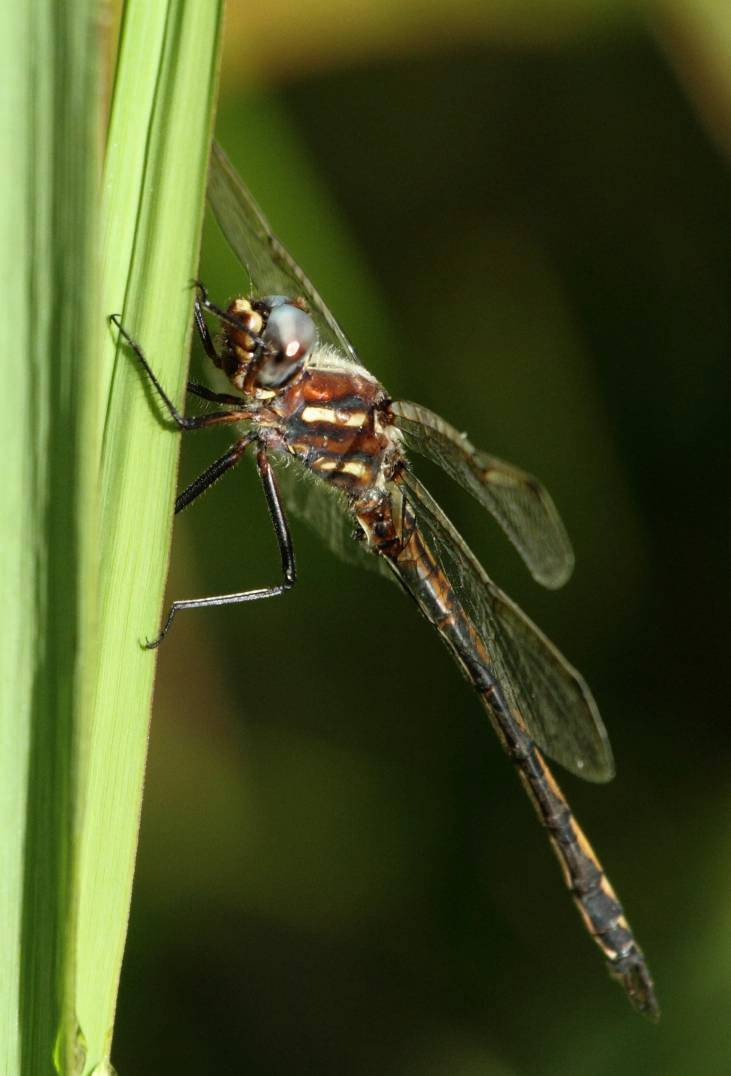
- Male

Conservation status
- Vulnerable (IUCN 3.1)

Scientific classification
- Kingdom: Animalia
- Phylum: Arthropoda
- Clade: Pancrustacea
- Class: Insecta
- Order: Odonata
- Infraorder: Anisoptera
- Superfamily: Libelluloidea
- Family: Idomacromiidae
- Genus: Syncordulia
- Species: S. gracilis

Binomial name
- Syncordulia gracilis Burmeister, 1839

= Syncordulia gracilis =

Species of dragonfly

Syncordulia gracilis, the yellow presba, is a species of dragonfly in the family Idomacromiidae.

== Distribution and status ==
Endemic species to the south western Western Cape Province, South Africa, with one historic 1948 record from, KwaZulu-Natal Province Drakensberg area, and one record 2000 from Prentjiesberg in Eastern Cape Province. It is rare throughout its range. It is no longer seen at many sites where it once was present, hence its vulnerable Red List status.

== Habitat ==
Its natural habitats are montane streams and rivers flowing over flat rocks, with fynbos or grassy banks localities.

== Identification ==
This species is about 43–48 mm long, with a wingspan 60–70 mm. Sexes much alike but ♀ has an amber wash on forewing and hindwing. The thorax has two yellow stripes on each side, and the abdomen is yellow and black.

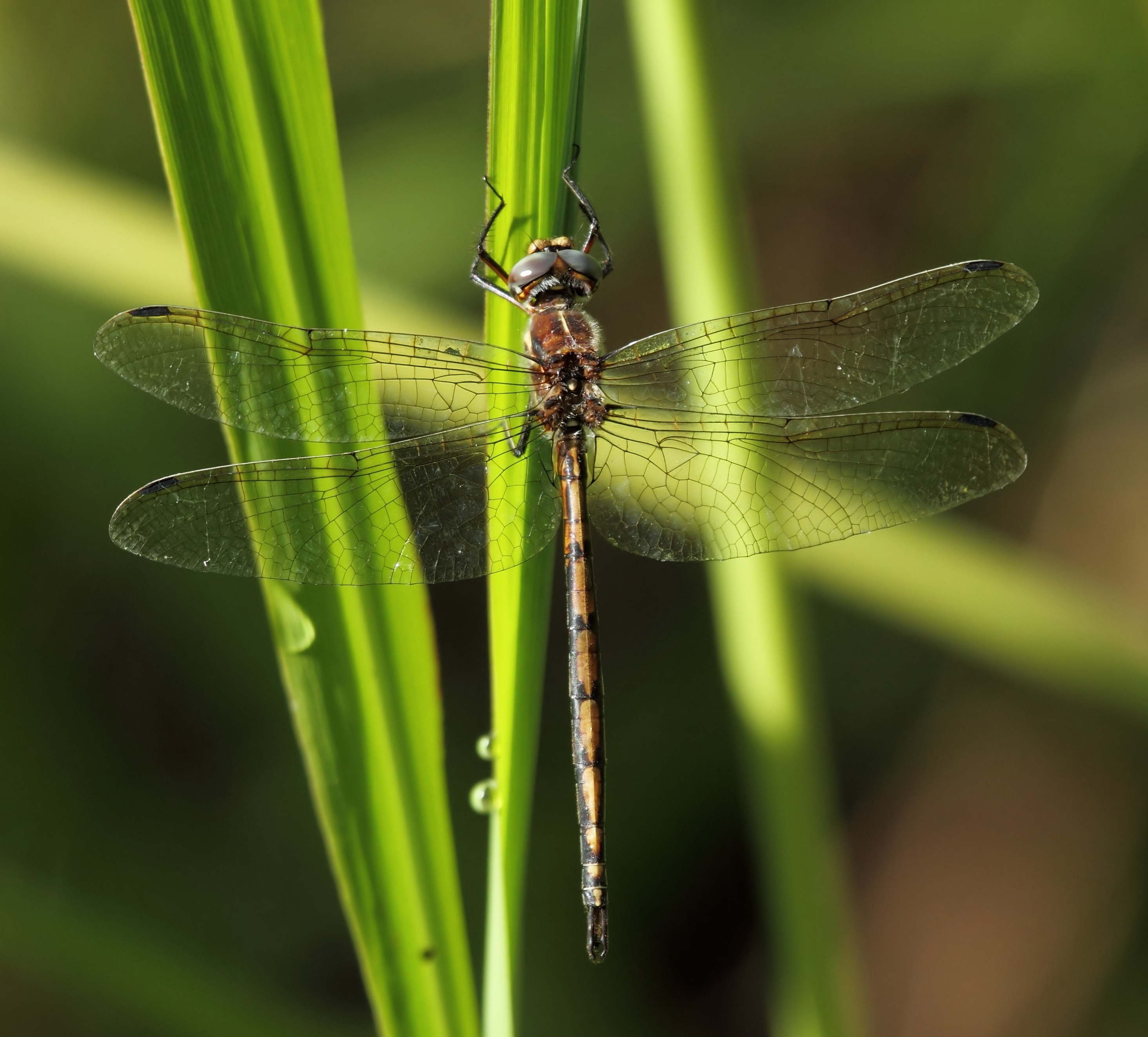
Yellow presba male

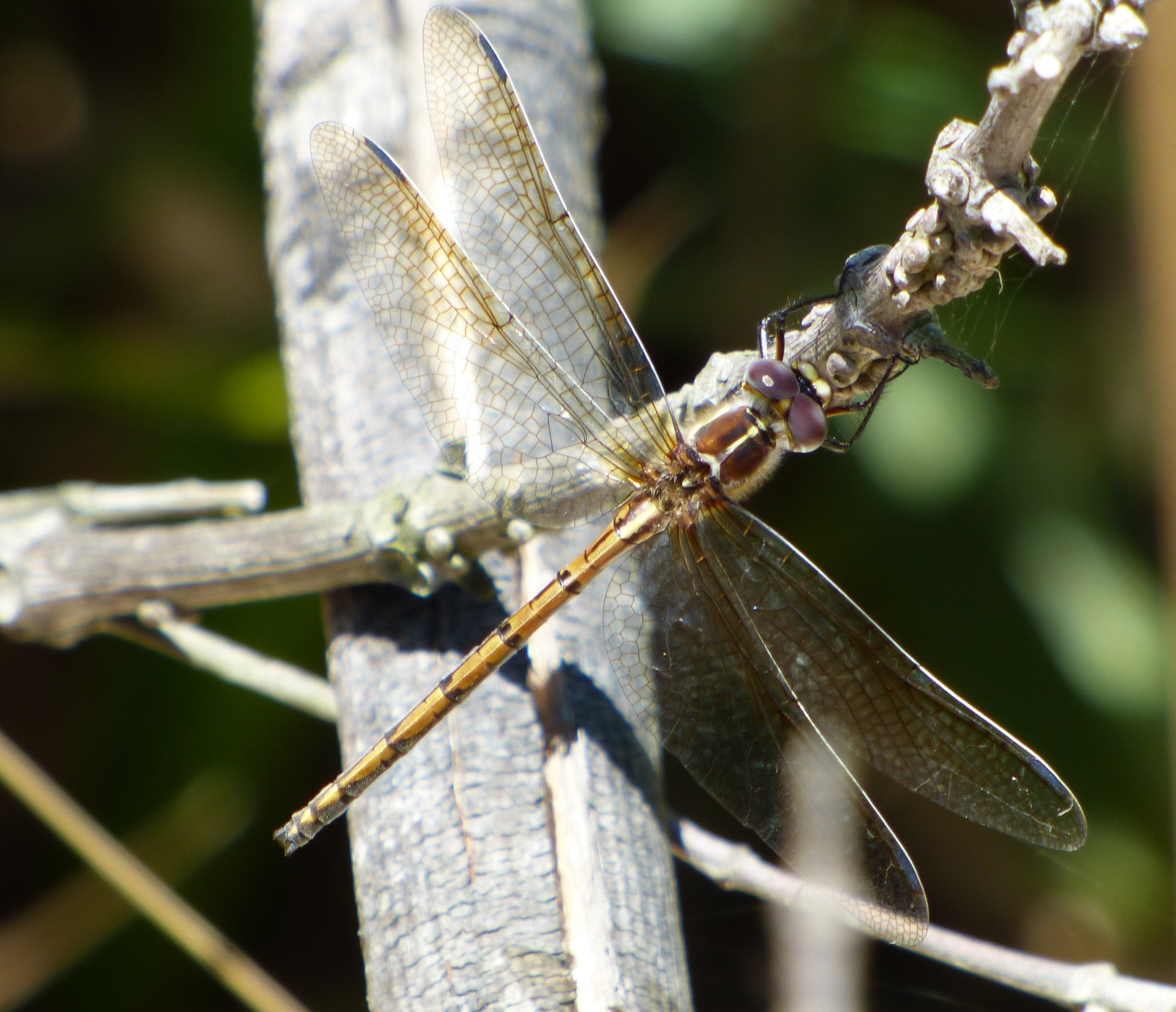
Yellow presba female
