= Heliogomphus walli =

Conservation status
- Vulnerable (IUCN 3.1)

Scientific classification
- Kingdom: Animalia
- Phylum: Arthropoda
- Clade: Pancrustacea
- Class: Insecta
- Order: Odonata
- Suborder: Anisoptera
- Family: Gomphidae
- Genus: Heliogomphus
- Species: H. walli

Binomial name
- Heliogomphus walli Fraser, 1925

Species of dragonfly

Heliogomphus walli, or Wall's grappletail, is a species of dragonfly in the family Gomphidae. It is endemic to Sri Lanka. It is also known as Wall's round-tip clubtail in some texts.

Heliogomphus walli inhabits the wet and intermediate zones of Sri Lanka and is associated with small forest streams with a canopy cover. It can be locally common, but its habitat is severely fragmented and declining.

== See also ==
- List of odonates of Sri Lanka

== Furhter reading ==
- Asia Dragonfly: Heliogomphus walli
- Sri Lanka Biodiversity
