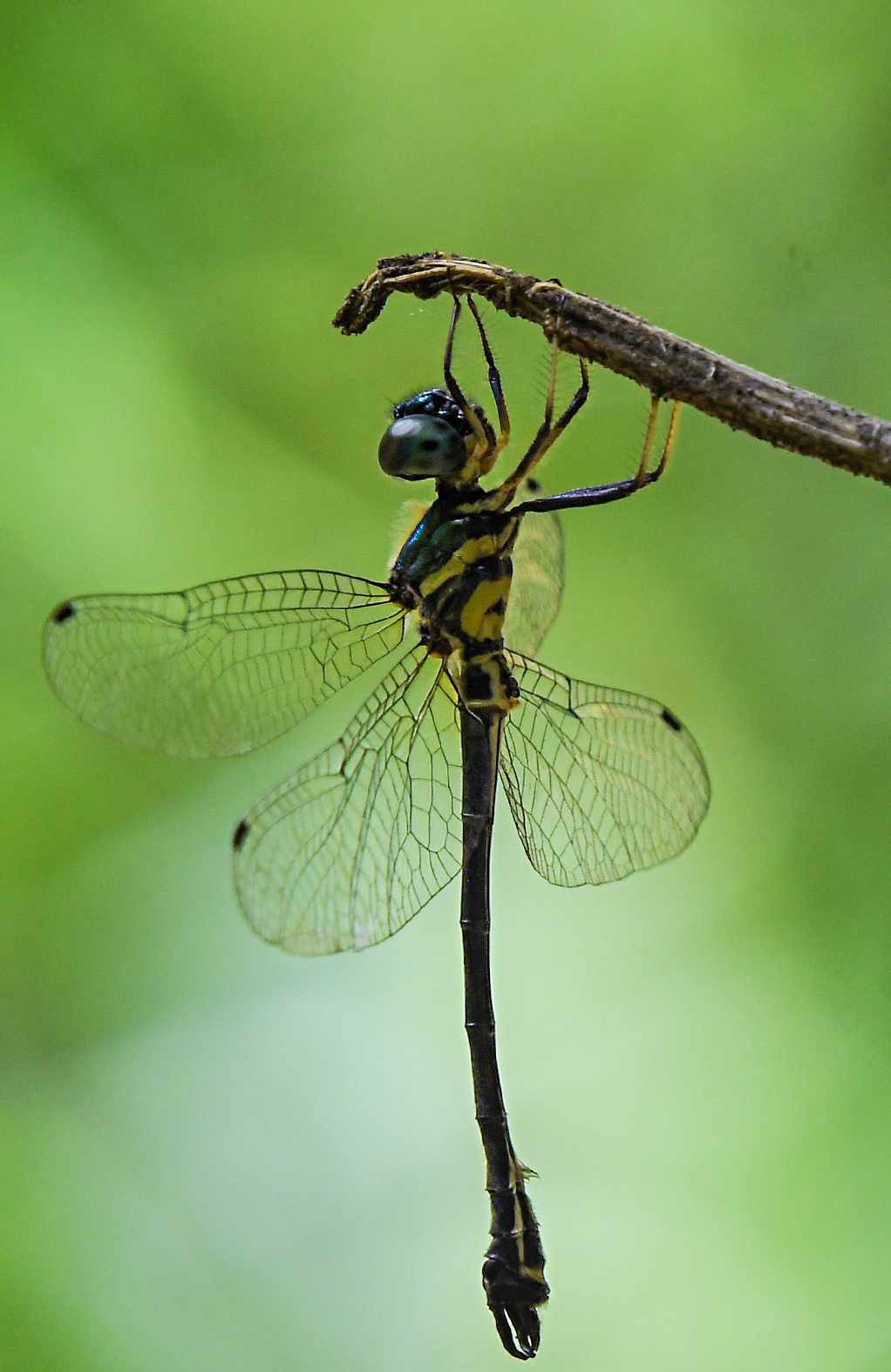
- Male, Ponmudi, Kerala

Conservation status
- Data Deficient (IUCN 3.1)

Scientific classification
- Kingdom: Animalia
- Phylum: Arthropoda
- Clade: Pancrustacea
- Class: Insecta
- Order: Odonata
- Infraorder: Anisoptera
- Superfamily: Libelluloidea
- Family: Idionychidae
- Genus: Idionyx
- Species: I. travancorensis

Binomial name
- Idionyx travancorensis Fraser, 1931

= Idionyx travancorensis =

Species of dragonfly

Idionyx travancorensis is a species of dragonfly in the family Idionychidae. It is known only from the Western Ghats of India.

== Description and habitat ==
It is a small dragonfly with emerald-green eyes. thorax metallic green. There is no humeral stripe. Laterally There is a narrow oblique stripe at the level of the spiracle and another on the hinder border of metepimeron. Beneath the side is black, bordered with yellow, and with a stripe of paler yellow at its middle. Abdomen is black. In segment 2, the ventral border and a narrow apical stripe in yellow. Segment 10 has a broad carina; but without a dorsal spine. Anal appendages are black.

The male can be easily distinguished by the shape of its inferior anal appendage and the female by its safironated wings and conical vesicle.

Fraser (1931) states that the species occurs from 3,000 - 4,000 ft in the Western Ghats and breeds in mountain streams. Nothing else is known of its habitat or ecology.

== See also ==
- List of odonates of India
- List of odonata of Kerala
