= Neocordulia setifera =

Conservation status
- Least Concern (IUCN 3.1)

Scientific classification
- Kingdom: Animalia
- Phylum: Arthropoda
- Clade: Pancrustacea
- Class: Insecta
- Order: Odonata
- Infraorder: Anisoptera
- Superfamily: Libelluloidea
- Family: Idomacromiidae
- Genus: Neocordulia
- Species: N. setifera

Binomial name
- Neocordulia setifera (Hagen in Selys, 1871)

Synonyms
- Gomphomacromia setifera Hagen in Selys, 1871; Cordulia setifera Hagen, 1861; Cordulia valga Hagen, 1861

Species of dragonfly

Neocordulia setifera is a species of dragonfly in the family Idomacromiidae. It occurs in eastern Brazil and northeastern Argentina, where it inhabits small forest streams and rivers.

The species was described by Hagen in Selys in 1871 as Gomphomacromia setifera and was transferred to the genus Neocordulia when Selys established that genus in 1882.

== Description ==
Neocordulia setifera is a medium-sized dragonfly with a slender body and transparent wings. The thorax is a brilliant dark metallic green, contrasting with the darker abdomen, which bears yellow markings along its sides.

The species is distinguished by the prominent tuft of stiff setae on the underside of the eighth abdominal segment of the male, a feature reflected in its scientific name. Selys noted its close relationship with Neocordulia batesi, while recognising consistent differences in the male appendages and abdominal structure.

== Distribution and habitat ==
Neocordulia setifera occurs in eastern Brazil and northeastern Argentina, where it has been recorded from elevations between 80 and 1,150 m.

The larvae develop in small rivers with clear, slow-moving water and sandy substrates. Adults have been observed patrolling along forest trails, dirt roads and streams in secondary forest.

== Taxonomic history ==
Neocordulia setifera was described by Hagen in 1871 as Gomphomacromia setifera. In the original description, Hagen characterised it as a "magnificent species" (magnifique espèce), noting particularly the brilliant metallic green thorax and the distinctive male abdominal structures.

When Selys established the genus Neocordulia in 1882, he transferred the species to the new genus, recognising it as one of a distinct group of Neotropical dragonflies. Michael May (1991) subsequently redescribed the species and clarified its diagnostic characters. He also concluded that an earlier record from Ecuador reported by René Martin (1906) was probably based on a misidentified specimen, as no verified records are known from Ecuador or the upper Amazon Basin.

== Etymology ==
The generic name Neocordulia presumably combines the Greek νέος (neos, "new") with the genus name Cordulia, likely reflecting Selys' recognition of the group as a distinct lineage closely related to Cordulia.

The species name setifera is presumably derived from the Latin seta ("bristle") and -fera ("bearing"), meaning "bristle-bearing". It likely refers to the prominent tuft of stiff setae on the underside of the eighth abdominal segment of the male, a distinctive feature noted in the original description.
