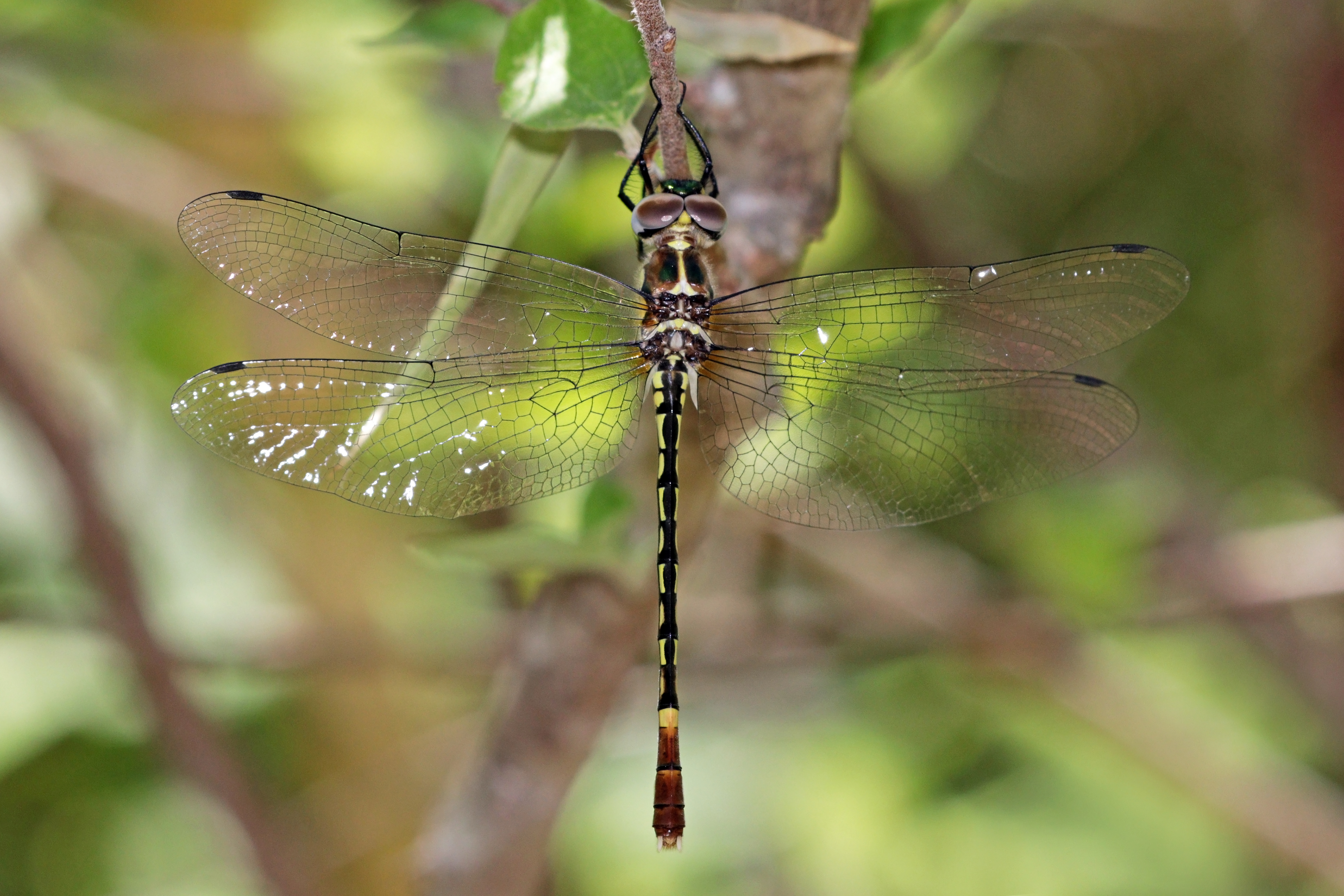
- Nesocordulia coloratissima female, Madagascar

Scientific classification
- Kingdom: Animalia
- Phylum: Arthropoda
- Clade: Pancrustacea
- Class: Insecta
- Order: Odonata
- Infraorder: Anisoptera
- Superfamily: Libelluloidea
- Family: Idomacromiidae
- Genus: Nesocordulia; McLachlan, 1882

= Nesocordulia =

Genus of dragonflies

Nesocordulia is a genus of dragonflies in the family Idomacromiidae, native to Madagascar and the Comoros. Members of the genus are medium-sized metallic-coloured dragonflies inhabiting forest streams and rivers, and are characterised by their bright yellow markings and distinctive male appendages.

== Description ==
Nesocordulia are medium-sized dragonflies with metallic green or blue-green bodies marked with lemon-yellow on the thorax and abdomen. They have long, slender legs, clear wings with dense venation, and a cylindrical abdomen that becomes broadened towards the tip in males.

The yellow abdominal markings are remarkably consistent across the genus, although the shape and extent of the markings differ between species. Males are distinguished by the form of the terminal abdominal segments and appendages, which are important characters for identifying species.

== Distribution and habitat ==
Species of Nesocordulia occur throughout Madagascar, with one species also recorded from Mwali in the Comoros.

Members of the genus inhabit forest streams, rivers and other freshwater habitats, where the larvae develop in flowing water. Adults are typically associated with wooded waterways and are most often encountered close to streams and rivers.

Although the genus has recently been revised, the ecology of most species remains poorly known.

Four species have not been recorded for more than a century, while only two species are known to occur in human-modified habitats.

== Taxonomic history ==
Nesocordulia was established by McLachlan in 1882 for Nesocordulia flavicauda, which remains the type species of the genus. He regarded it as intermediate between Neocordulia and Oxygastra, but sufficiently distinct to warrant a separate genus.

Fraser (1956) revised the genus, expanding its diagnosis to accommodate additional Madagascan species and emphasising the form of the male abdomen, appendages and colour pattern as important diagnostic characters.

The genus was formerly placed in the family Corduliidae. Following an interim period in which it was treated as incertae sedis within Libelluloidea, Goodman and colleagues (2025) placed Nesocordulia in the family Idomacromiidae.

Bernard and colleagues (2025) revised the genus, recognising twelve species, including six described as new. They identified Nesocordulia as the first recognised radiation of dragonflies (Anisoptera) in the Malagasy Region.

== Species ==
The following species are currently placed in Nesocordulia:

- Nesocordulia coloratissima Bernard, Daraż, Ravelomanana & Dijkstra, 2025
- Nesocordulia evanida Bernard, Daraż & Dijkstra, 2025
- Nesocordulia flavicauda McLachlan, 1882
- Nesocordulia fossa Bernard, Daraż, Ravelomanana & Dijkstra, 2025
- Nesocordulia ipsio Bernard, Daraż & Dijkstra, 2025
- Nesocordulia lyricauda Bernard, Daraż & Dijkstra, 2025
- Nesocordulia malgassica Fraser, 1956
- Nesocordulia mascarenica Fraser, 1948
- Nesocordulia odonator Bernard, Daraż, Ravelomanana & Dijkstra, 2025
- Nesocordulia rubricauda Martin, 1900
- Nesocordulia spinicauda Martin, 1902
- Nesocordulia villiersi Legrand, 1984

== Etymology ==
The generic name Nesocordulia is derived from the Greek νῆσος (nēsos, "island") and the genus name Cordulia. McLachlan chose the name to reflect the insular distribution of the genus on Madagascar and its relationship to Cordulia.
