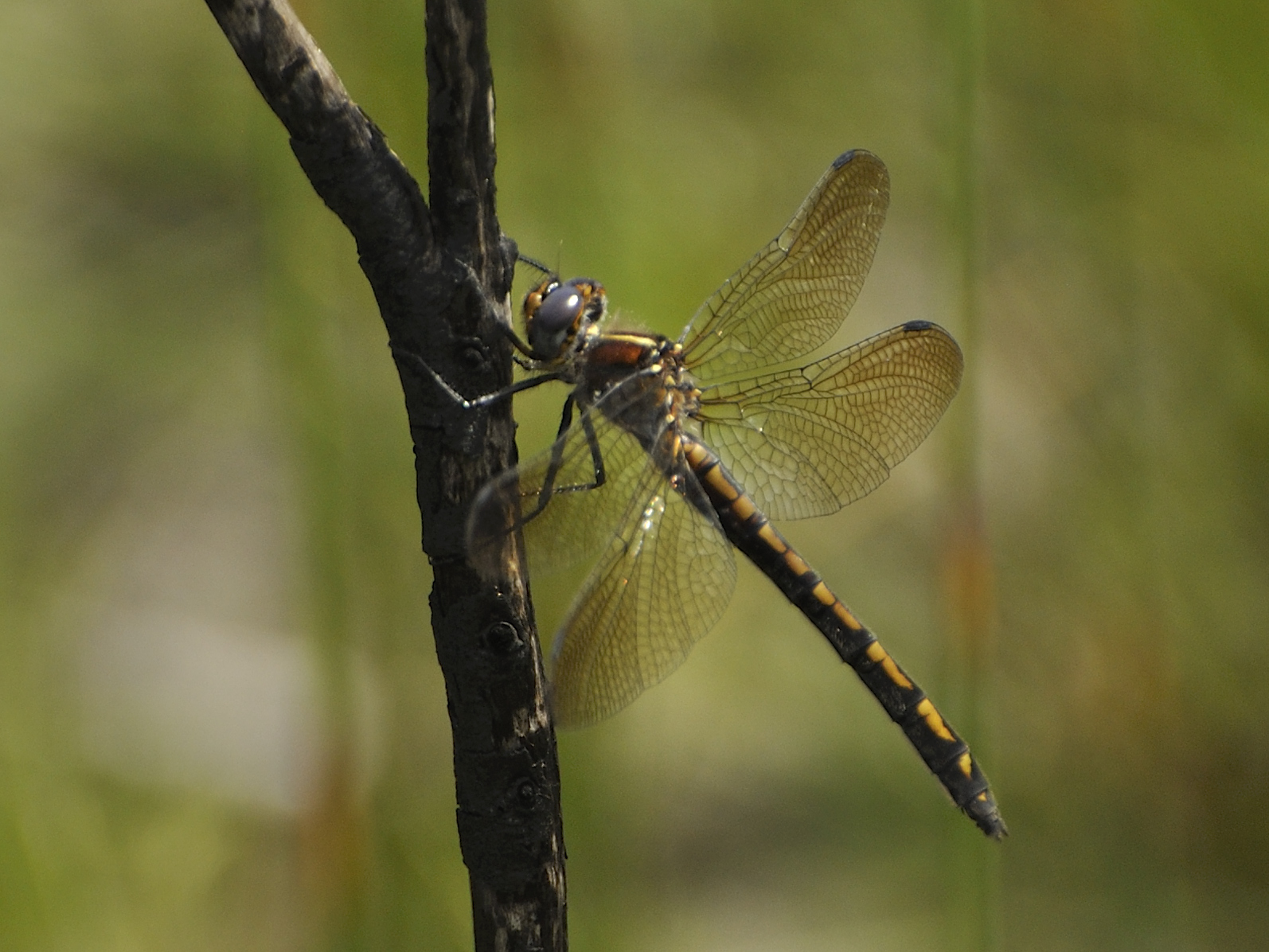

Conservation status
- Vulnerable (IUCN 3.1)

Scientific classification
- Kingdom: Animalia
- Phylum: Arthropoda
- Clade: Pancrustacea
- Class: Insecta
- Order: Odonata
- Infraorder: Anisoptera
- Superfamily: Libelluloidea
- Family: Idomacromiidae
- Genus: Syncordulia
- Species: S. legator

Binomial name
- Syncordulia legator Dijkstra, Samways & Simaika, 2007

= Syncordulia legator =

Species of dragonfly

Syncordulia legator, commonly known as the guilded presba, is a species of dragonfly in the family Idomacromiidae. It is a vulnerable species endemic to South Africa.

== Distribution and habitat ==
Syncordulia legator is known only from the south west Cape Province of South Africa, ranging from Cederberg in the north to the Palmiet River in the south. It is mostly found near fast-flowing rocky montane rivers surrounded by fynbos at 350–800 m (1,150–2,620 ft) above sea level.

== Description ==
Adult Syncordulia legator are large, slender dragonflies measuring 49–50 mm (1.9–2.0 in) long. The body is dark brown with yellow markings.

== Ecology ==
Adult Syncordulia legator are active on the wing from mid September to early January but are rarely seen. They often rest close to the ground.

== Conservation status ==
Syncordulia legator is listed as vulnerable on the International Union for the Conservation of Nature Red List under criteria B2ab(iii), based on its small, fragmented distribution and threat of habitat degradation. It is threatened by agriculture, invasive species, and water pollution.
