= Idionyx nadganiensis =

Conservation status
- Data Deficient (IUCN 3.1)

Scientific classification
- Kingdom: Animalia
- Phylum: Arthropoda
- Clade: Pancrustacea
- Class: Insecta
- Order: Odonata
- Infraorder: Anisoptera
- Superfamily: Libelluloidea
- Family: Idionychidae
- Genus: Idionyx
- Species: I. nadganiensis

Binomial name
- Idionyx nadganiensis Fraser, 1924

Species of dragonfly

Idionyx nadganiensis is a species of dragonfly in the family Idionychidae. It was first described by British entomologist Frederic Charles Fraser in 1924. The species is known only from two females caught at Nadgani Ghat in the Western Ghats.
