= Nesocordulia villiersi =

Conservation status
- Endangered (IUCN 3.1)

Scientific classification
- Kingdom: Animalia
- Phylum: Arthropoda
- Clade: Pancrustacea
- Class: Insecta
- Order: Odonata
- Suborder: Anisoptera
- Superfamily: Libelluloidea
- Family: Idomacromiidae
- Genus: Nesocordulia
- Species: N. villiersi

Binomial name
- Nesocordulia villiersi Legrand, 1984

Species of dragonfly

Nesocordulia villiersi, the Comoro knifetail, is a species of dragonfly in the family Idomacromiidae. It is known only from the island of Mohéli (Mwali) in the Comoros, where it is considered endangered because of its extremely restricted distribution and the continuing decline of its forested freshwater habitat.

== Description ==
Nesocordulia villiersi is a relatively small dragonfly, measuring about 45 mm in total length. It has a metallic black and dark brown body with green, blue and violet reflections, marked with pale yellow spots on the thorax and abdomen.

It is distinguished from related species by subtle differences in its colour pattern and the shape of the male abdominal appendages. It is the second-smallest species of Nesocordulia and the only member of the genus known from the Comoros.

== Distribution and habitat ==
Nesocordulia villiersi is known only from its type locality on the island of Mohéli in the Comoros, approximately 450 km northwest of Madagascar. The holotype was collected in November 1955 near Lac Iconi (now Hamavouna), a small watercourse and settlement close to Lake Dziani Boundouni.

Its habitat and ecology remain largely unknown. The species has not been recorded since its original collection despite subsequent surveys, although it may have been overlooked. Ongoing deforestation, erosion and degradation of freshwater habitats on Mohéli are considered the principal threats to the species.

== Taxonomic history ==
Nesocordulia villiersi was described by Jean Legrand in 1984 from a male collected on Mohéli in the Comoros in November 1955 by A. Robinson. The holotype is preserved in the Muséum national d'histoire naturelle in Paris.

The species was redescribed by Bernard and colleagues (2025) during a revision of the genus Nesocordulia, which confirmed it as the only species of the genus known from the Comoros, providing a modern redescription and comparison with its Madagascan relatives.

== Conservation ==
Nesocordulia villiersi is classified as Endangered on the IUCN Red List because it is known only from a single location on Mohéli, where the extent and quality of its habitat are continuing to decline. The principal threats are deforestation, soil erosion and the degradation of freshwater habitats. Despite recent surveys, the species has not been recorded since the type specimen was collected, although it may have been overlooked.

The species is not known from any protected conservation programme, and its habitat and ecology remain poorly understood.

== Etymology ==
The generic name Nesocordulia is derived from the Greek νῆσος (nēsos, "island") and the genus name Cordulia. McLachlan chose the name to reflect the insular distribution of the genus on Madagascar and its relationship to Cordulia.

The species name villiersi is an eponym honouring André Villiers, the French entomologist who specialised in Afrotropical true bugs (Hemiptera) and longhorn beetles (Cerambycidae), and who helped establish the new series of the Revue française d'Entomologie.
