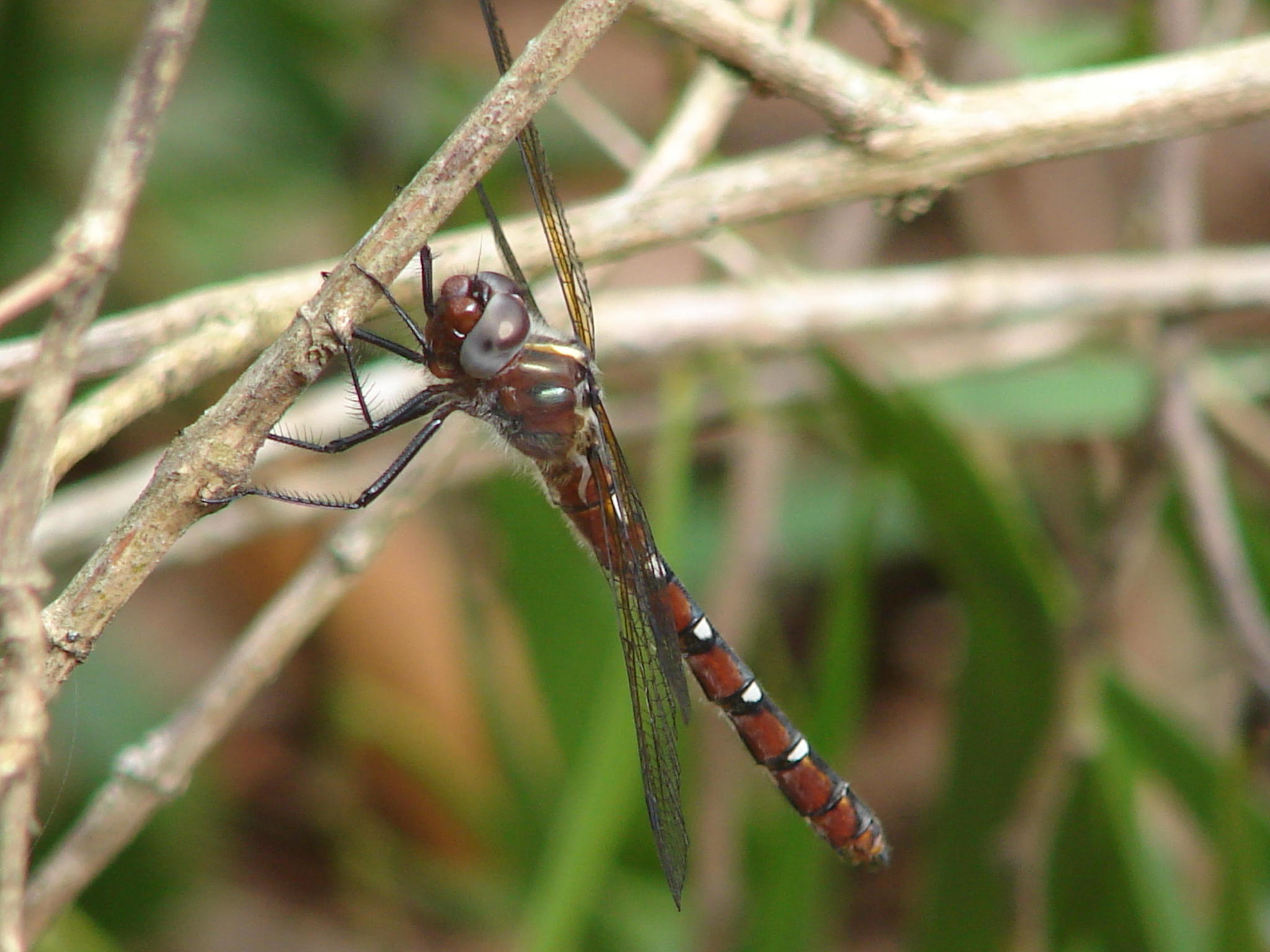

Conservation status
- Vulnerable (IUCN 3.1)

Scientific classification
- Kingdom: Animalia
- Phylum: Arthropoda
- Clade: Pancrustacea
- Class: Insecta
- Order: Odonata
- Infraorder: Anisoptera
- Superfamily: Libelluloidea
- Family: Idomacromiidae
- Genus: Syncordulia
- Species: S. venator

Binomial name
- Syncordulia venator Barnard, 1933

Synonyms
- Presba venator Barnard, 1933

= Syncordulia venator =

Species of dragonfly

Syncordulia venator is a species of dragonfly in the family Idomacromiidae. This was first described by Barnard in 1933. The IUCN classifies the species as vulnerable.
