= Idionyx rhinoceroides =

Conservation status
- Least Concern (IUCN 3.1)

Scientific classification
- Kingdom: Animalia
- Phylum: Arthropoda
- Clade: Pancrustacea
- Class: Insecta
- Order: Odonata
- Infraorder: Anisoptera
- Superfamily: Libelluloidea
- Family: Idionychidae
- Genus: Idionyx
- Species: I. rhinoceroides

Binomial name
- Idionyx rhinoceroides Fraser, 1934

Species of dragonfly

Idionyx rhinoceroides is a species of dragonfly in the family Idionychidae. It is known only from a single female collected from type locality (Dhoni, Palakkad, Kerala) in the Western Ghats of India.

== Description ==
It is a small dragonfly with emerald-green eyes. Its thorax is metallic emerald-green, coated with yellow hairs on dorsum. Humeral stripe is absent. There is a narrow oblique citron-yellow stripe traversing the spiracle and another bordering the lower part of metepimeron. Beneath the side is yellow, with an oblique bluish-black stripe and a triangular blackish-brown spot. Abdomen is black. The ventral borders of segments 2 and 3 are citron-yellow.

This species can be easily distinguished from all other species by the unique shape of its vesicle.

== See also ==
- List of odonates of India
- List of odonata of Kerala
