= Idomacromia proavita =

Conservation status
- Least Concern (IUCN 3.1)

Scientific classification
- Kingdom: Animalia
- Phylum: Arthropoda
- Clade: Pancrustacea
- Class: Insecta
- Order: Odonata
- Infraorder: Anisoptera
- Superfamily: Libelluloidea
- Family: Idomacromiidae
- Genus: Idomacromia
- Species: I. proavita

Binomial name
- Idomacromia proavita Karsch, 1896

Species of dragonfly

Idomacromia proavita, the greater shadowcruiser, is a species of dragonfly in the family Idomacromiidae. It is found in the tropical forests of western and central Africa, where it inhabits shaded rainforest streams. It is the type species of the genus Idomacromia, which was established by Ferdinand Karsch when he described the species in 1896.

== Description ==
Idomacromia proavita is a medium-sized dragonfly about 56 mm long with a dark metallic green to blue-green body, clear wings and relatively short, robust legs. The first four abdominal segments are metallic blue-green, while the remainder of the abdomen is black with a metallic sheen.

Males have a broadened abdomen towards the tip and prominent terminal appendages. The species is distinguished from other members of the genus by the distinctive shape of the male appendages.

== Distribution and habitat ==
Idomacromia proavita is distributed across the tropical rainforests of western and central Africa, with records from Cameroon, Gabon, the Democratic Republic of the Congo, Côte d'Ivoire, Guinea and Nigeria. It inhabits small, shaded streams in lowland and montane rainforest, where the adults are seldom encountered.

Little is known of its biology. Males patrol narrow forest streams in deep shade, while females have been observed inserting eggs into submerged or waterlogged wood using their elongated ovipositor. The larvae live in small forest streams and may occupy seepages and stream sources with fine substrates.

== Taxonomic history ==
Idomacromia proavita was described by Ferdinand Karsch in 1896 from a male collected in Cameroon. In the same publication, Karsch established the genus Idomacromia for the species, concluding that although it resembled Macromia, its combination of wing venation, body form and male appendages justified recognition as a distinct genus.

During the twentieth century, Idomacromia proavita remained the only recognised species of the genus until additional African species were described from Gabon and Uganda. Molecular phylogenetic studies published in 2025 confirmed Idomacromia as one of five genera comprising the family Idomacromiidae.

== Conservation ==
Idomacromia proavita is classified as Least Concern on the IUCN Red List. Although it is known from relatively few records, it is widely distributed across the rainforests of western and central Africa and is thought to be overlooked rather than genuinely rare.

The principal threat to the species is the continuing loss and degradation of rainforest habitat through agriculture and timber extraction.

== Etymology ==
The generic name Idomacromia presumably combines Idionyx and Macromia. When establishing the genus in 1896, Ferdinand Karsch regarded it as sharing characteristics with both genera while differing sufficiently from each to warrant recognition as a distinct genus.

The species name proavita is presumably derived from the Latin proavitus, meaning "ancestral" or "ancient". Although Karsch did not explain the name, it likely refers to the distinctive and apparently primitive nature of the species, which he considered sufficiently different from related dragonflies to establish the new genus Idomacromia.
