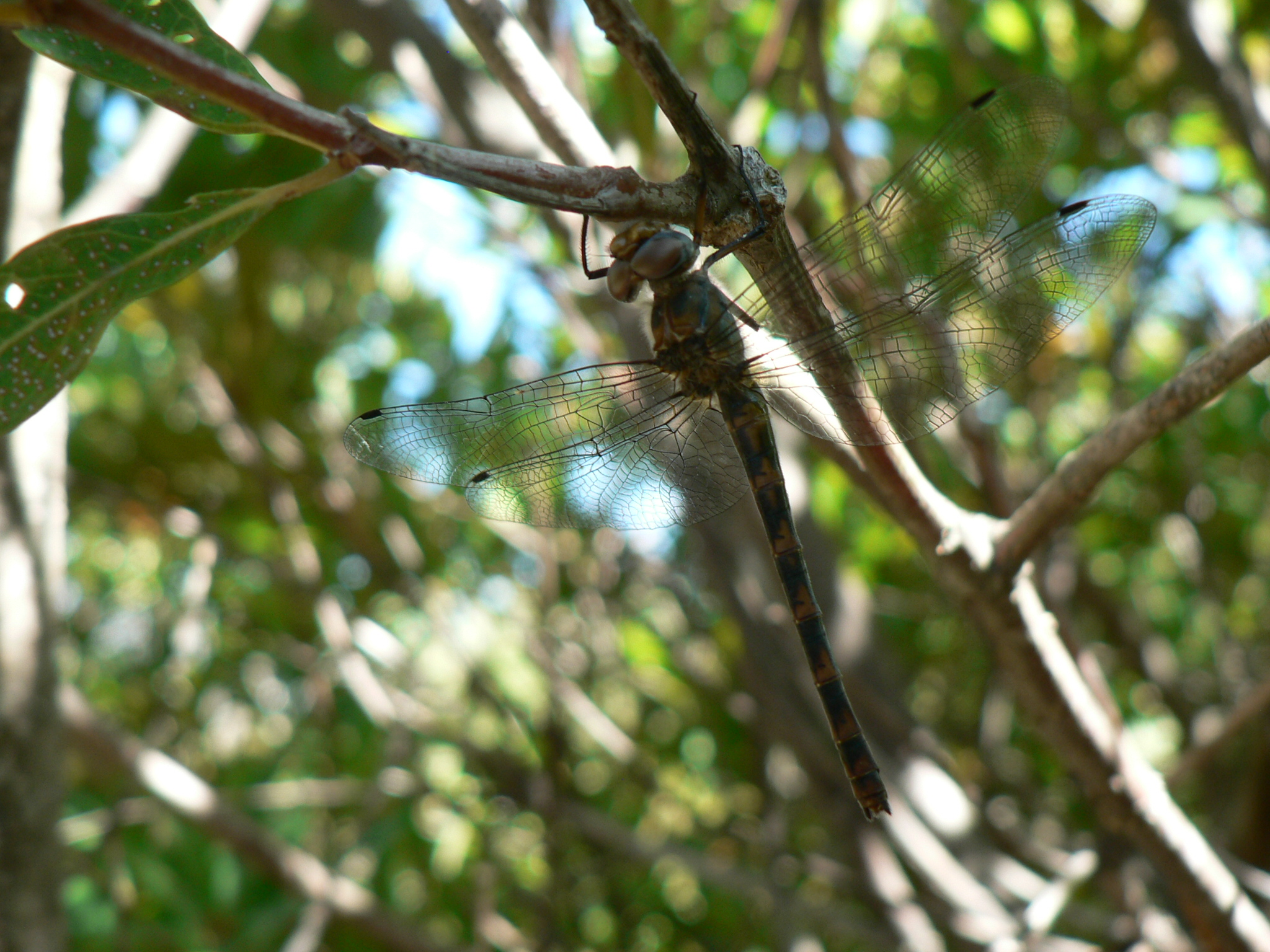

Conservation status
- Endangered (IUCN 3.1)

Scientific classification
- Kingdom: Animalia
- Phylum: Arthropoda
- Clade: Pancrustacea
- Class: Insecta
- Order: Odonata
- Infraorder: Anisoptera
- Superfamily: Libelluloidea
- Family: Idomacromiidae
- Genus: Syncordulia
- Species: S. serendipator

Binomial name
- Syncordulia serendipator Dijkstra, Samways & Simaika, 2007

= Syncordulia serendipator =

Species of dragonfly

Syncordulia serendipator, the rustic presba, is a species of dragonfly in the family Idomacromiidae.

== Description ==
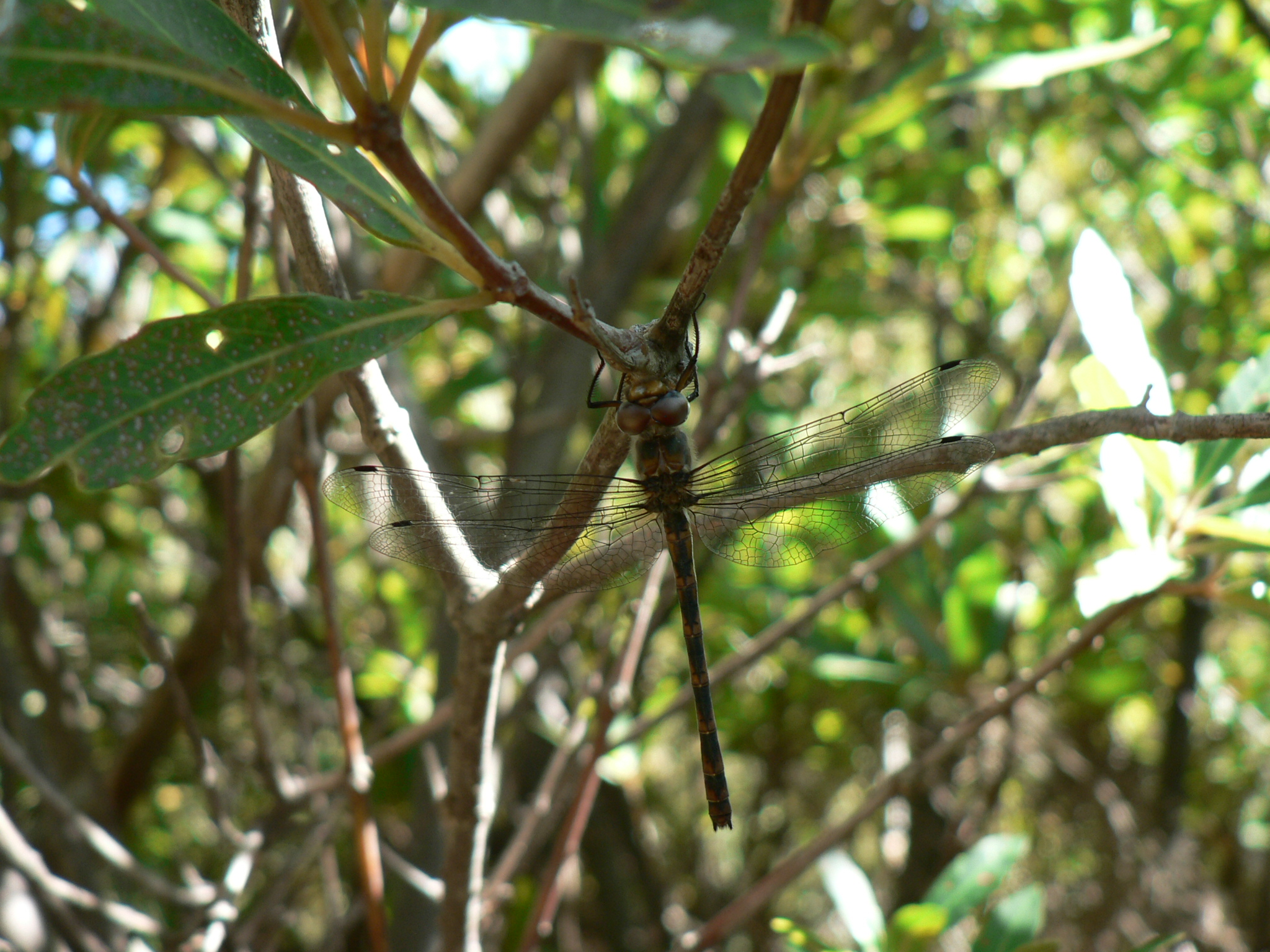
Rustic presba, top view

The rustic presba is medium-sized and has a stout build. The body is dark brown with yellow spots, the face is yellow-brown with brownish dark grey eyes. The thorax is brownish black with pale spots. It is glossy and covered with long white hair. The clear wings have black veins and are smoky at the base. The pterostigmata are long and black. The stout abdomen is dark glossy mahogany with diagnostic paler banding in the front of each segment. The brown appendages are robust and parallel from above. The inferior appendages have shallow hooks.

== Distribution and habitat ==
The species is endemic to the Western Cape Province, South Africa, where it inhabits montane rock-and boulder-strewn streams and rivers with pools in fynbos localities. It is a rare species and only found localised.
