= Nesocordulia malgassica =

Conservation status
- Data Deficient (IUCN 3.1)

Scientific classification
- Kingdom: Animalia
- Phylum: Arthropoda
- Clade: Pancrustacea
- Class: Insecta
- Order: Odonata
- Infraorder: Anisoptera
- Superfamily: Libelluloidea
- Family: Idomacromiidae
- Genus: Nesocordulia
- Species: N. malgassica

Binomial name
- Nesocordulia malgassica Fraser, 1956

Species of dragonfly

Nesocordulia malgassica, the rusty-tipped knifetail, is a species of dragonfly in the family Idomacromiidae. It is endemic to eastern Madagascar, where it inhabits forested freshwater habitats.

== Description ==
Nesocordulia malgassica is a medium-sized dragonfly about 53–56 mm long. It has a metallic green and bronze-black body marked with yellow spots on the thorax and the front of the abdomen. The wings are transparent with brown pterostigmata, and the legs are long and slender.

The species is distinguished by the rusty-red colour of the terminal abdominal segments (S7–10), from which its common name "Rusty-tipped Knifetail" is derived, and by the long, slender male abdominal appendages.

== Distribution and habitat ==
Nesocordulia malgassica is endemic to eastern Madagascar, where it is known from two localities approximately 75 km apart within the Madagascar Humid Forests ecoregion. One locality lies between the Analamazaotra Special Reserve and Mantadia National Park, while the other is at Ambila-Lemaitso in the Atsinanana Region, from which the type specimens were collected in 1951.

The species inhabits forested freshwater habitats. It has been recorded in the Mantadia region alongside Nesocordulia fossa and Nesocordulia odonator, indicating that several species of Nesocordulia may occur together in the same area. First collected in 1951, the species was photographed again more than fifty years later, confirming that it remains extant.

== Taxonomic history ==
Nesocordulia malgassica was described by Fraser in 1956 from a male and female collected at Ambila-Lemaitso in eastern Madagascar in 1951. The holotype and allotype are preserved in the Muséum national d'histoire naturelle in Paris.

In their 2025 revision of the genus, Bernard and colleagues redescribed the species, clarified its diagnostic characters, and confirmed its distribution in eastern Madagascar.

== Etymology ==
The generic name Nesocordulia is derived from the Greek νῆσος (nēsos, "island") and the genus name Cordulia. McLachlan chose the name to reflect the insular distribution of the genus on Madagascar and its relationship to Cordulia.

The species name malgassica is a feminine adjective meaning "of Madagascar" or "Malagasy", referring to the species' country of origin.
