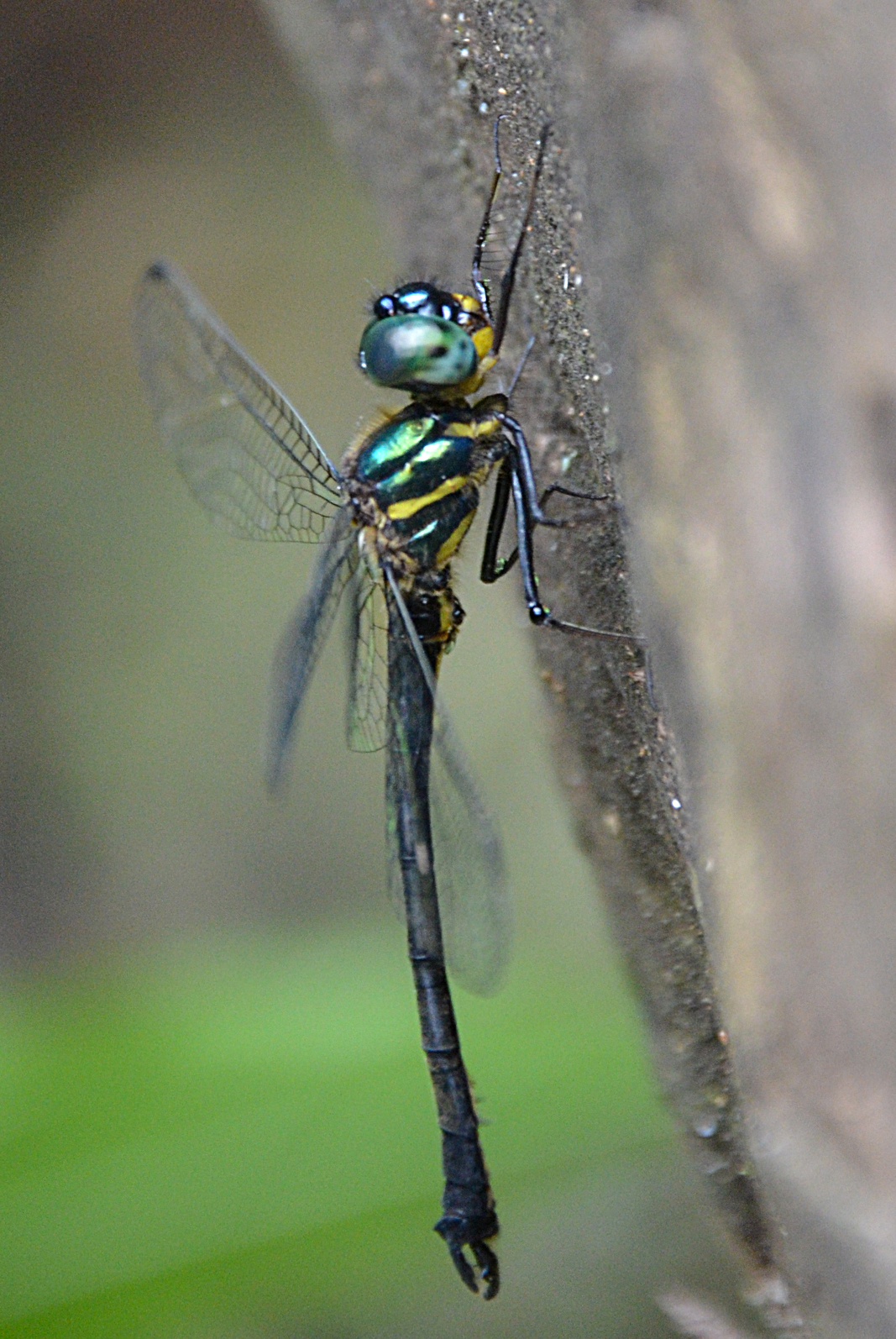
- Male from Agastya Mala

Conservation status
- Data Deficient (IUCN 3.1)

Scientific classification
- Kingdom: Animalia
- Phylum: Arthropoda
- Clade: Pancrustacea
- Class: Insecta
- Order: Odonata
- Infraorder: Anisoptera
- Superfamily: Libelluloidea
- Family: Idionychidae
- Genus: Idionyx
- Species: I. corona

Binomial name
- Idionyx corona Fraser, 1921

Synonyms
- Idionyx burliyarensis Fraser, 1922; Idionyx nilgiriensis Fraser, 1922

= Idionyx corona =

Species of dragonfly

Idionyx corona is a species of dragonfly in the family Idionychidae. It is known only from the Western Ghats of India.

== Description ==
It is a small dragonfly with emerald-green eyes. Its thorax is metallic green with a golden reflex. There is a vestigial humeral yellow stripe, laterally a narrow oblique yellow stripe traversing the spiracle and another stripe on the lower border of metepimeron. Wings are transparent, tinted with pale golden-yellow at base. Abdoemen is black. Segments 2 and 3 are narrowly yellow along the ventral border. Segment 10 prominently keeled. Anal appendages are black.

The species is a small one and varies from others by the male, as well as by the female, having the wings tinted with golden-yellow along the costa nearly to the pterostigma. The inferior appendage without lateral spines will serve to distinguish it from others of the same group, whilst the female is easily distinguished by the shape of its unique vesicle.

== See also ==
- List of odonates of India
- List of odonata of Kerala
