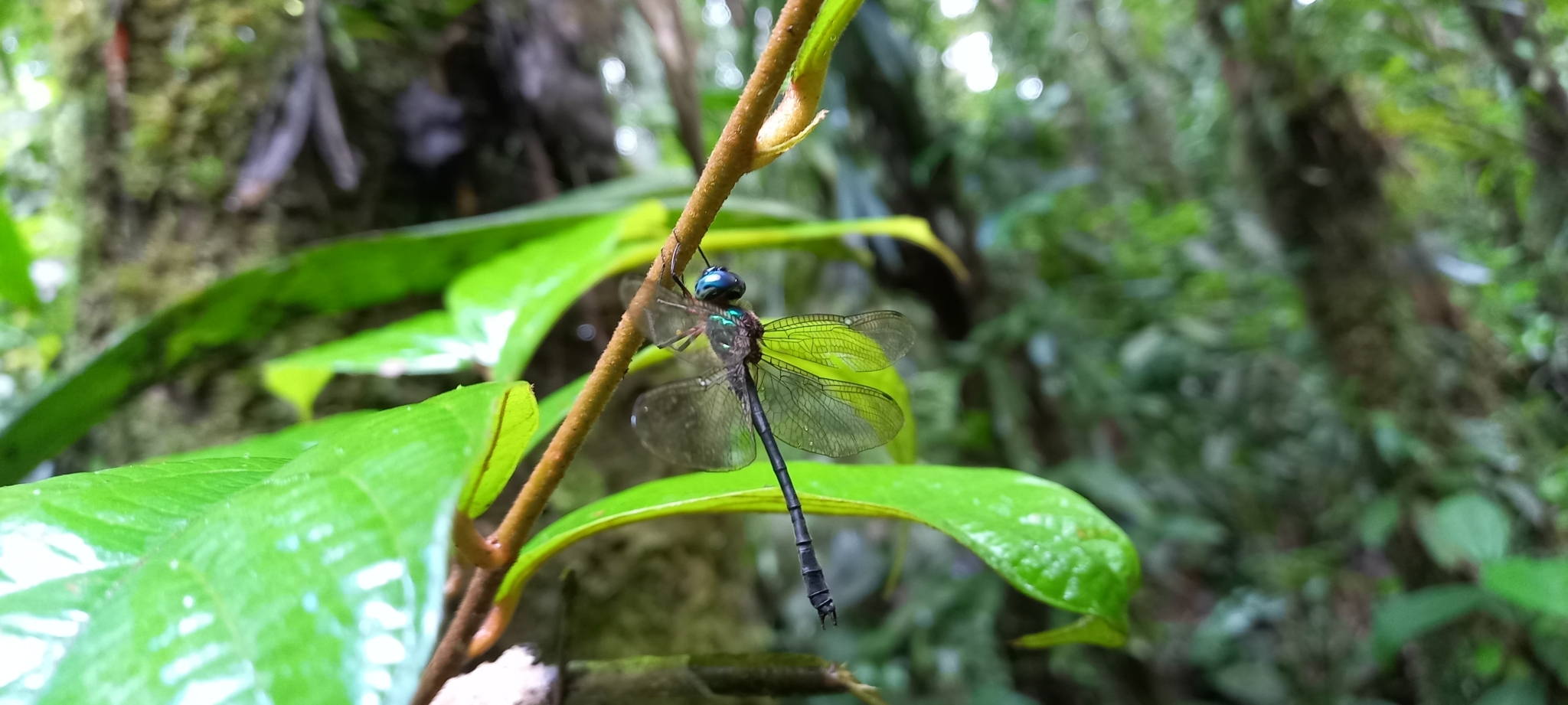
- Male

Conservation status
- Least Concern (IUCN 3.1)

Scientific classification
- Kingdom: Animalia
- Phylum: Arthropoda
- Clade: Pancrustacea
- Class: Insecta
- Order: Odonata
- Infraorder: Anisoptera
- Superfamily: Libelluloidea
- Family: Idomacromiidae
- Genus: Neocordulia
- Species: N. batesi

Binomial name
- Neocordulia batesi (Selys, 1871)

Synonyms
- Gomphomacromia batesi Selys, 1871; Neocordulia longipollex Calvert, 1909

= Neocordulia batesi =

Species of dragonfly

Neocordulia batesi is a species of dragonfly in the family Idomacromiidae, commonly known as Bates' emerald. It is distributed from southern Mexico through Central America to the Amazon Basin of northern South America, where it inhabits forest streams.

The species was originally described by Selys in 1871 as Gomphomacromia batesi and was transferred to the genus Neocordulia when Selys established that genus in 1882.

== Description ==
Neocordulia batesi is a medium-sized dragonfly with a slender metallic green to bronze body, bright green eyes and transparent wings. The thorax is metallic bronze-green and the abdomen is dark with a slight expansion towards the middle segments.

The wings are clear with dark venation and a small brown pterostigma. Males are distinguished by the shape of the appendages, while females have a shorter, broader abdomen. Selys regarded Neocordulia batesi as one of the most striking species of the group and noted its close resemblance to Neocordulia setifera, from which it differs in its larger size and the structure of the male terminal appendages.

== Distribution and habitat ==
Bates' emerald is distributed from southern Mexico through Central America to the Amazon Basin of northern South America.

The species inhabits streams within tropical forests, where the larvae develop in freshwater. It has a wide distribution and has been recorded from a number of protected areas throughout its range, including national parks in Colombia, Costa Rica and Panama.

== Taxonomic history ==
Neocordulia batesi was described by Selys in 1871 as Gomphomacromia batesi, based on material collected in the Amazon region by the naturalist Henry Walter Bates.

When Selys established the genus Neocordulia in 1882, he transferred Gomphomacromia batesi to the new genus, recognising it as one of a distinct group of Neotropical dragonflies. The species was subsequently redescribed by May (1991), who clarified its diagnostic characters and synonymised Neocordulia longipollex Calvert, 1909 with Neocordulia batesi.

== Etymology ==
The generic name Neocordulia presumably combines the Greek νέος (neos, "new") with the genus name Cordulia, likely reflecting Selys' recognition of the group as a distinct lineage closely related to Cordulia.

The species name batesi is an eponym honouring the English naturalist Henry Walter Bates, who collected the type specimen during his explorations of the Amazon Basin. Selys dedicated the species to Bates likely in recognition of his important contributions to the natural history of tropical South America.
