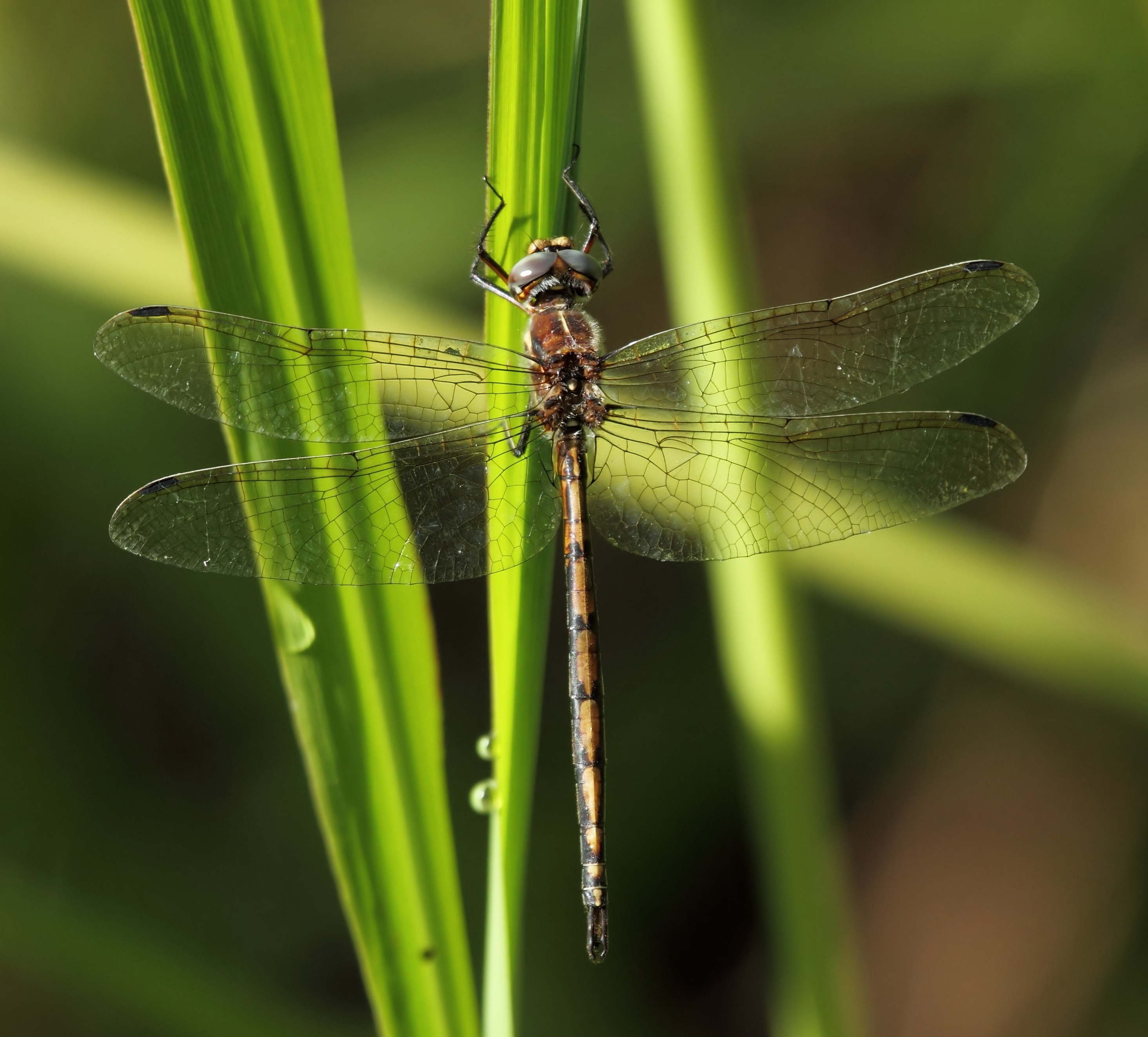
- Syncordulia gracilis

Scientific classification
- Kingdom: Animalia
- Phylum: Arthropoda
- Clade: Pancrustacea
- Class: Insecta
- Order: Odonata
- Infraorder: Anisoptera
- Superfamily: Libelluloidea
- Family: Idomacromiidae
- Genus: Syncordulia; Selys, 1882

Species
- Syncordulia gracilis; Syncordulia legator; Syncordulia serendipator; Syncordulia venator

= Syncordulia =

Genus of dragonflies

Syncordulia is a genus of dragonflies and one of five genera in the family Idomacromiidae. The genus comprises four recognised species, all endemic to the Western Cape and Eastern Cape provinces of South Africa.

Species of Syncordulia inhabit clear, fast-flowing mountain streams in fynbos landscapes. They are metallic green to bronze dragonflies with slender abdomens and are among the most geographically restricted members of the family. All four species are of conservation concern owing to their small ranges and the ongoing degradation of their freshwater habitats.

== Description ==
Syncordulia are medium-sized dragonflies with metallic green to bronze bodies, bright green eyes and slender abdomens. They are distinguished by their relatively narrow wings and the shape of the male terminal abdominal segments, characters that led Selys to establish the genus in 1882.

Adults are swift fliers that usually remain close to clear, fast-flowing mountain streams. Both sexes are metallic in appearance, although females generally have stouter abdomens than males.

== Distribution and habitat ==
Syncordulia is endemic to the Cape Floristic Region of South Africa, where all four species occur in the mountains of the Western and Eastern Cape provinces. Each species has a restricted distribution and is known from only a small number of localities.

Members of the genus inhabit clear, fast-flowing mountain streams and rivers, particularly in fynbos vegetation. They are associated with rocky or boulder-strewn watercourses with good water quality and are sensitive to habitat disturbance. The principal threats include invasive alien trees, water abstraction, pollution and other changes to stream ecology.

== Taxonomic history ==
Syncordulia was established by Selys in 1882 as a subgenus of Cordulia for a single species, Epophthalmia gracilis Burmeister, 1839. He considered it sufficiently distinct from Oxygastra and related genera on the basis of its simpler wing venation and the structure of the male terminal abdominal segments.

The genus was subsequently recognised as a distinct lineage within the broadly defined family Corduliidae. Molecular phylogenetic studies later showed that Syncordulia belongs to a separate evolutionary lineage within Libelluloidea. Following an interim period in which it was treated as incertae sedis, Goodman and colleagues (2025) placed the genus in the family Idomacromiidae.

== Species ==
The following species are currently placed in Syncordulia:

- Syncordulia gracilis (Burmeister, 1839) - yellow presba
- Syncordulia legator Dijkstra, Samways & Simaika, 2007 - gilded presba
- Syncordulia serendipator Dijkstra, Samways & Simaika, 2007 - rustic presba
- Syncordulia venator (Barnard, 1933) - mahogany presba

== Etymology ==
The generic name Syncordulia is presumably derived from the Greek σύν (syn, "together" or "with") and the genus name Cordulia, likely reflecting the close relationship recognised by Selys when he established the genus in 1882.
