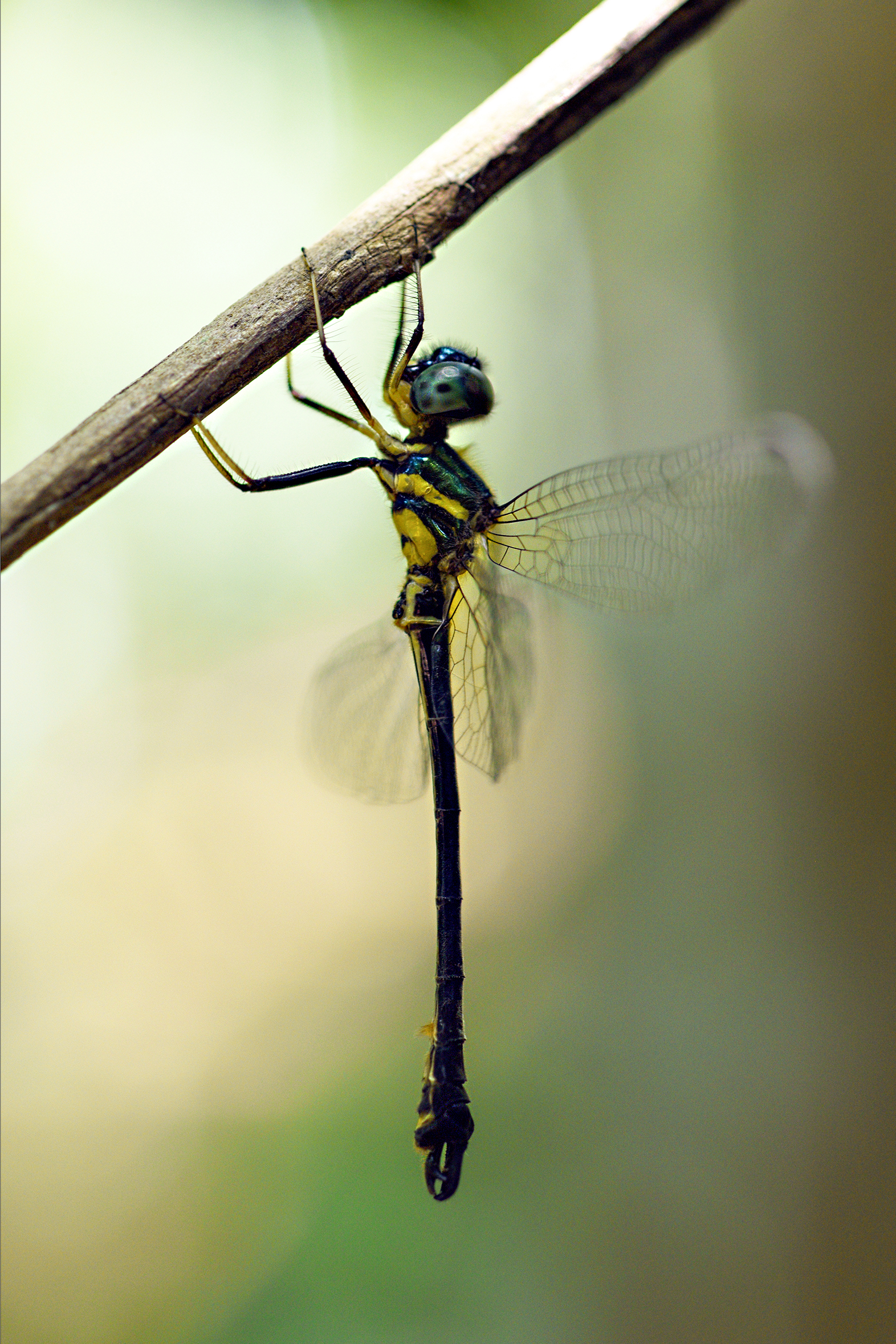

Conservation status
- Data Deficient (IUCN 3.1)

Scientific classification
- Kingdom: Animalia
- Phylum: Arthropoda
- Clade: Pancrustacea
- Class: Insecta
- Order: Odonata
- Infraorder: Anisoptera
- Superfamily: Libelluloidea
- Family: Idionychidae
- Genus: Idionyx
- Species: I. saffronatus

Binomial name
- Idionyx saffronatus Fraser, 1924

Synonyms
- Idionyx saffronata Fraser, 1924 (Missp.)

= Idionyx saffronatus =

Saffron shadow dancer

Species of dragonfly

Idionyx saffronatus, or saffron shadow dancer, is a species of dragonfly in the family Idionychidae. It is known only from the Western Ghats of India.

== Description and habitat ==
It is a small dragonfly with emerald-green eyes. Its thorax is brilliant metallic green with a narrow medial oblique stripe on each side. The posterior half of the metepimeron is yellow. Beneath the side is striped black and yellow. The abdomen is black. The first and second segments marked narrowly along the ventral borders with citron-yellow. Segments 7 to 10 are bordered with bright yellow. Segment 10 strongly keeled but without a dorsal spine. Anal appendages are black.

Fraser (1936) states that the species occurs of altitudes of 3,000 ft and more. Nothing else is known about the habitat or ecology of this species.

== See also ==
- List of odonates of India
- List of odonata of Kerala
