= Niall McNeill =

Irish army officer and entomologist

Niall MacNeill (1899–1969) was an Irish army officer and entomologist who specialised in Odonata and Heteroptera.

He was the son of Eoin MacNeill, founder of the Irish Volunteers, which Niall MacNeill joined later becoming an officer in the Irish Army. With the rank of colonel, he specialised in surveying, training with the Royal Engineers on the Isle of Wight. After retiring from the army he worked for the Ordnance Survey of Ireland; he was made Assistant Director of the body in 1935.

MacNeill is best known for his studies of larval Odonata on which he worked with A. Eric Gardner and Frederic Charles Fraser. He was a personal friend of both, and of Cynthia Longfield.

Niall MacNeill was a Member of the Royal Irish Academy and a Fellow of the Royal Entomological Society.
