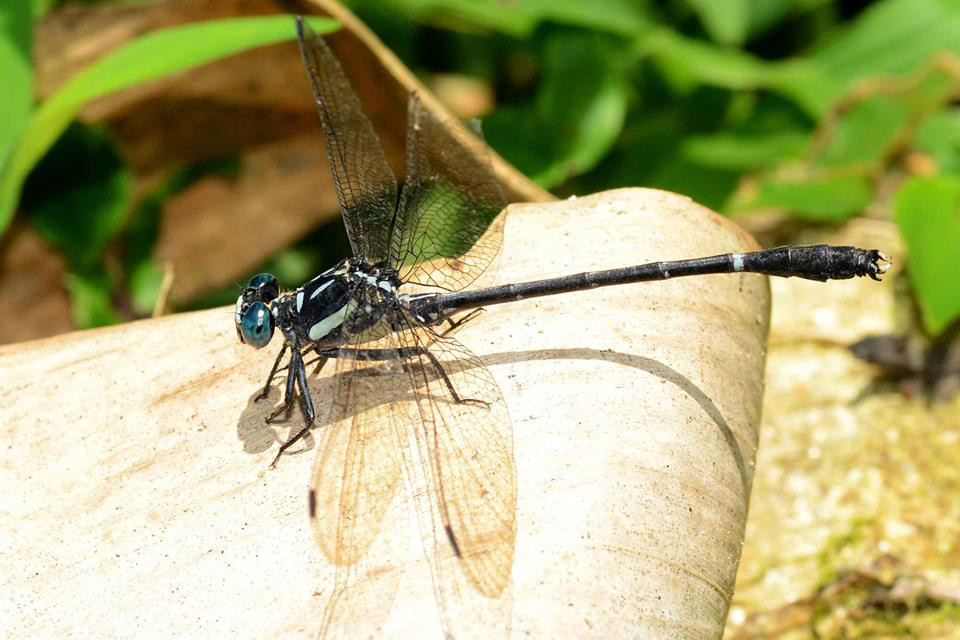
- Male

Conservation status
- Near Threatened (IUCN 3.1)

Scientific classification
- Kingdom: Animalia
- Phylum: Arthropoda
- Class: Insecta
- Order: Odonata
- Infraorder: Anisoptera
- Family: Gomphidae
- Genus: Heliogomphus
- Species: H. promelas

Binomial name
- Heliogomphus promelas (Selys, 1873)

Synonyms
- Gomphus promelas Selys, 1873

= Heliogomphus promelas =

Species of dragonfly

Heliogomphus promelas is a species of dragonfly in the family Gomphidae. It is endemic to the Western Ghats of India.

== Description and habitat ==
It is a medium-sized dragonfly with bottle-green eyes. Its thorax is black on dorsum, and greenish-yellow on sides. There is a complete yellow meso-thoracic collar and short yellow ante-humeral stripes parallel to the mid-dorsal carina. Abdomen is black, marked with pale greenish-yellow. There is a narrow mid-dorsal stripe extending from segment 1 to 5. There is a large lateral spot on segment 1 and 2 and small baso-lateral spots on 3 to 6. Segment 7 has a ring on its basal third and a dorsal spot on segment 8. Remaining segments are entirely black. Superior anal appendages are black at base, pale green to yellow at the apices. Inferiors are black. Female is similar to the male.

It is commonly found as small colonies on small mountain streams, tiny brooks and seepage on hillsides.

== See also ==
- List of odonates of India
- List of odonata of Kerala
