= Heliogomphus ceylonicus =

Conservation status
- Critically endangered, possibly extinct (IUCN 3.1)

Scientific classification
- Kingdom: Animalia
- Phylum: Arthropoda
- Clade: Pancrustacea
- Class: Insecta
- Order: Odonata
- Suborder: Anisoptera
- Family: Gomphidae
- Genus: Heliogomphus
- Species: H. ceylonicus

Binomial name
- Heliogomphus ceylonicus (Selys, 1878)

Species of dragonfly

Heliogomphus ceylonicus is a species of dragonfly in the family Gomphidae. It is endemic to Sri Lanka. Its natural habitats are subtropical or tropical moist lowland forests and rivers. It is threatened by habitat loss.
