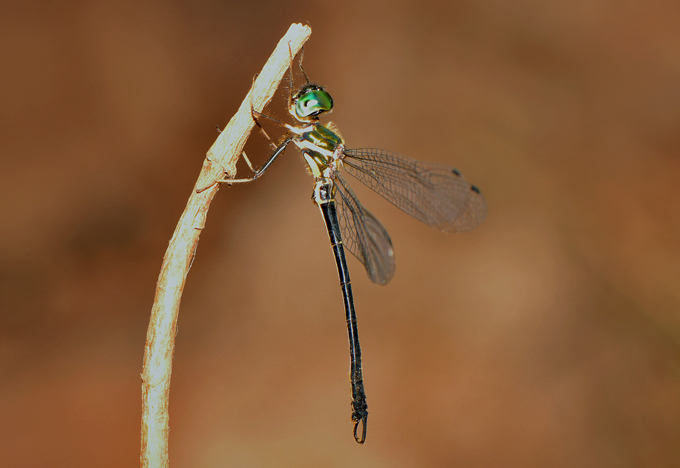
- male

Conservation status
- Data Deficient (IUCN 3.1)

Scientific classification
- Kingdom: Animalia
- Phylum: Arthropoda
- Clade: Pancrustacea
- Class: Insecta
- Order: Odonata
- Infraorder: Anisoptera
- Superfamily: Libelluloidea
- Family: Idionychidae
- Genus: Idionyx
- Species: I. gomantakensis

Binomial name
- Idionyx gomantakensis Subramanian, Rangnekar & Naik, 2013

= Idionyx gomantakensis =

Species of dragonfly

Idionyx gomantakensis, commonly known as Goan shadow dancer, is a species of dragonfly in the family Idionychidae. It is known only from the Western Ghats of India.

This species was first sighted at Collem, Goa by Parag Rangnekar and Rohan Naik during a survey of dragonflies conducted by them under the banner of the Mineral Foundation of Goa, and supported by the Department of Science and Technology.

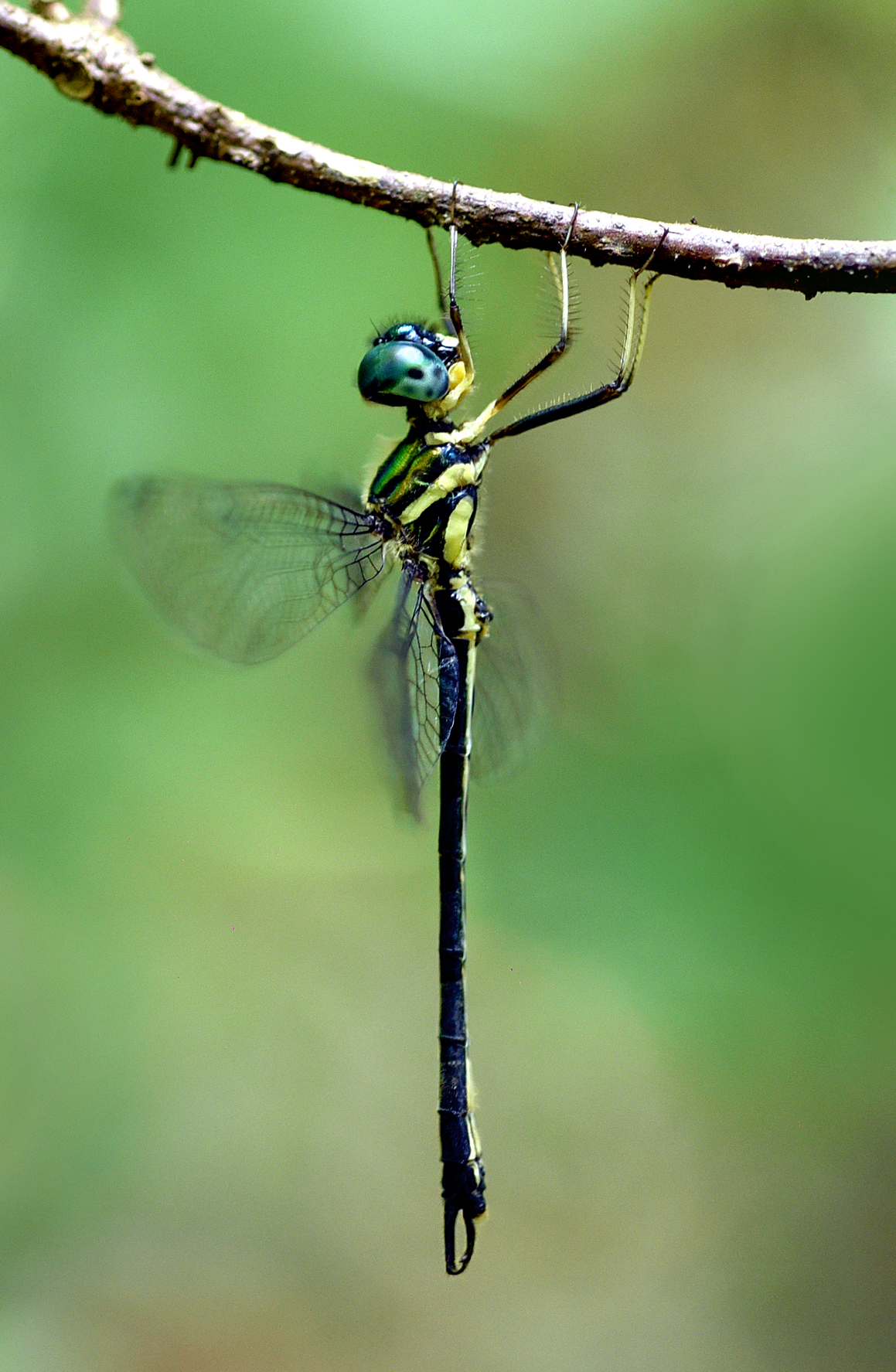
male

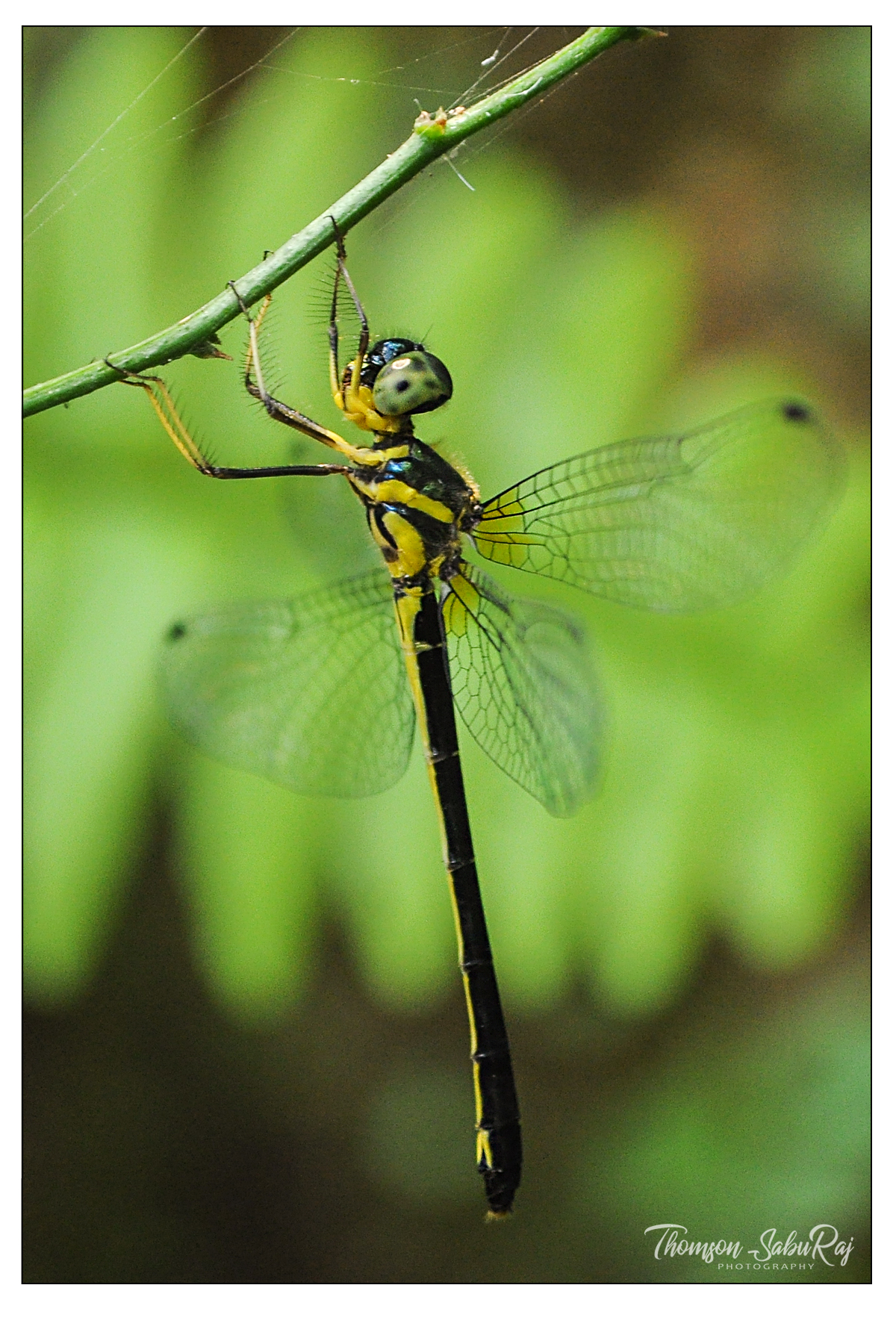
female

This species can be differentiated from other species of Idionyx by long and slender cerci and epiproct, absence of teeth in the basal half of the cerci, and a tuft of golden hairs at the end of the lateral lobes of the epiproct.

== See also ==
- List of odonates of India
- List of odonata of Kerala
