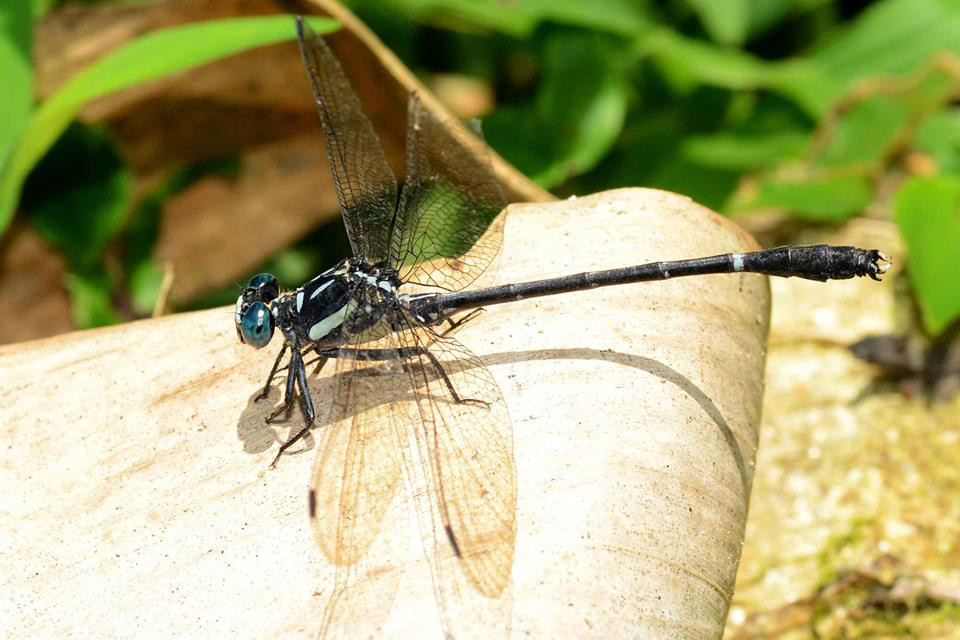
- Heliogomphus promelas

Scientific classification
- Kingdom: Animalia
- Phylum: Arthropoda
- Class: Insecta
- Order: Odonata
- Infraorder: Anisoptera
- Family: Gomphidae
- Genus: Heliogomphus; Laidlaw, 1922

= Heliogomphus =

Genus of dragonflies

Heliogomphus is a genus of dragonflies in the family Gomphidae.

The genus contains the following species:

- Heliogomphus bakeri Laidlaw, 1925
- Heliogomphus blandulus Lieftinck, 1929
- Heliogomphus borneensis Lieftinck, 1964
- Heliogomphus cervus Fraser, 1942
- Heliogomphus ceylonicus (Hagen in Selys, 1878) – Sri Lanka grappletail
- Heliogomphus chaoi Karube, 2004
- Heliogomphus drescheri Lieftinck, 1929
- Heliogomphus gracilis (Krüger, 1899)
- Heliogomphus kalarensis Fraser, 1934
- Heliogomphus kelantanensis (Laidlaw, 1902)
- Heliogomphus lieftincki Fraser, 1942
- Heliogomphus lyratus Fraser, 1933
- Heliogomphus nietneri (Hagen in Selys, 1878)
- Heliogomphus olivaceus Lieftinck, 1961
- Heliogomphus promelas (Selys, 1873)
- Heliogomphus retroflexus (Ris, 1912)
- Heliogomphus scorpio (Ris, 1912)
- Heliogomphus selysi Fraser, 1925
- Heliogomphus spirillus (Fraser, 1922)
- Heliogomphus svihleri (Asahina, 1970)
- Heliogomphus walli Fraser, 1925 – Wall's grappletail
