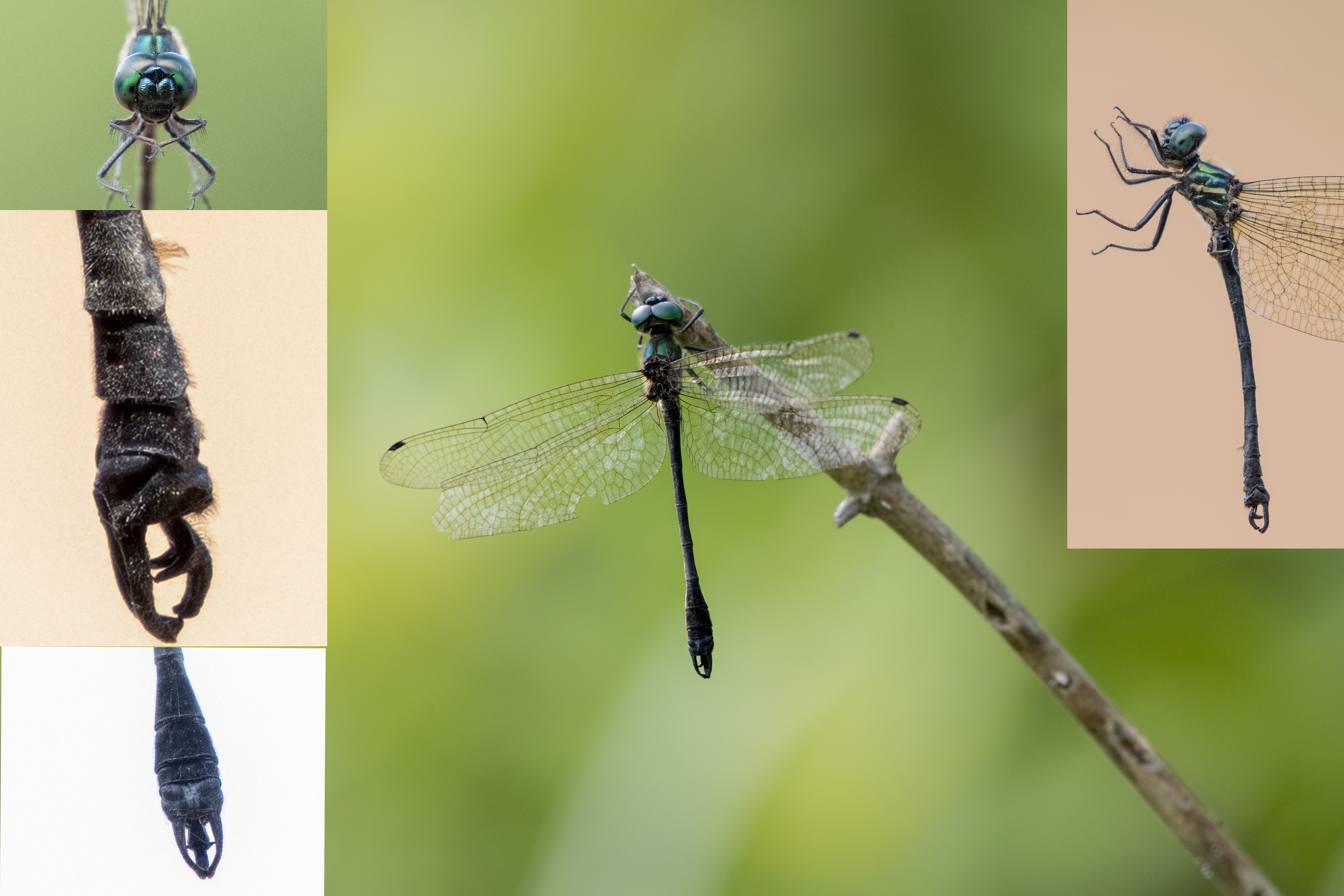
- Male

Conservation status
- Endangered (IUCN 3.1)

Scientific classification
- Kingdom: Animalia
- Phylum: Arthropoda
- Clade: Pancrustacea
- Class: Insecta
- Order: Odonata
- Infraorder: Anisoptera
- Superfamily: Libelluloidea
- Family: Idionychidae
- Genus: Idionyx
- Species: I. galeatus

Binomial name
- Idionyx galeatus Fraser, 1924

Synonyms
- Idionyx galeata Fraser, 1924 (Missp.)

= Idionyx galeatus =

Species of dragonfly

Idionyx galeatus is a species of dragonfly in the family Idionychidae. It is known only from the Kodagu district, South Canara, Wayanad and Nilgiris in Western Ghats of India.

== Description and habitat ==
It is a medium-sized dragonfly with emerald-green eyes. Its thorax is metallic green with a golden reflex. There is no humeral stripe; but an oblique citron-yellow stripe bordering the antero-lateral suture, and a similar stripe on the lower posterior border of metepimeron. Beneath the side is blackish, striped with yellow. Abdomen is black. The borders of segment 2 ventrally yellow, and also a narrow incomplete annule on the apical border. Anal appendages are black.

The male is easily distinguished by the shape of its anal appendages, and the female by the unique shape of its vesicle.

Fraser (1936) states that most of the specimens were observed flying quite low over coffee bushes or along the borders of ferny banks. The species is usually found flying over torrent streams and open forest patches on mountain tops. They fly in short circles close to ground during early mornings and late evenings.

== See also ==
- List of odonates of India
- List of odonata of Kerala
