= Robert McLachlan =

Robert McLachlan may refer to:

- Robert McLachlan (cyclist) (born 1971), Australian cyclist
- Robert McLachlan (cinematographer), Canadian cinematographer
- Robert McLachlan (entomologist) (1837–1904), British entomologist
- Robert Wallace McLachlan (1845–1926), early Canadian numismatist
- Robert McLachlan (mathematician) (born 1964), New Zealand mathematician
