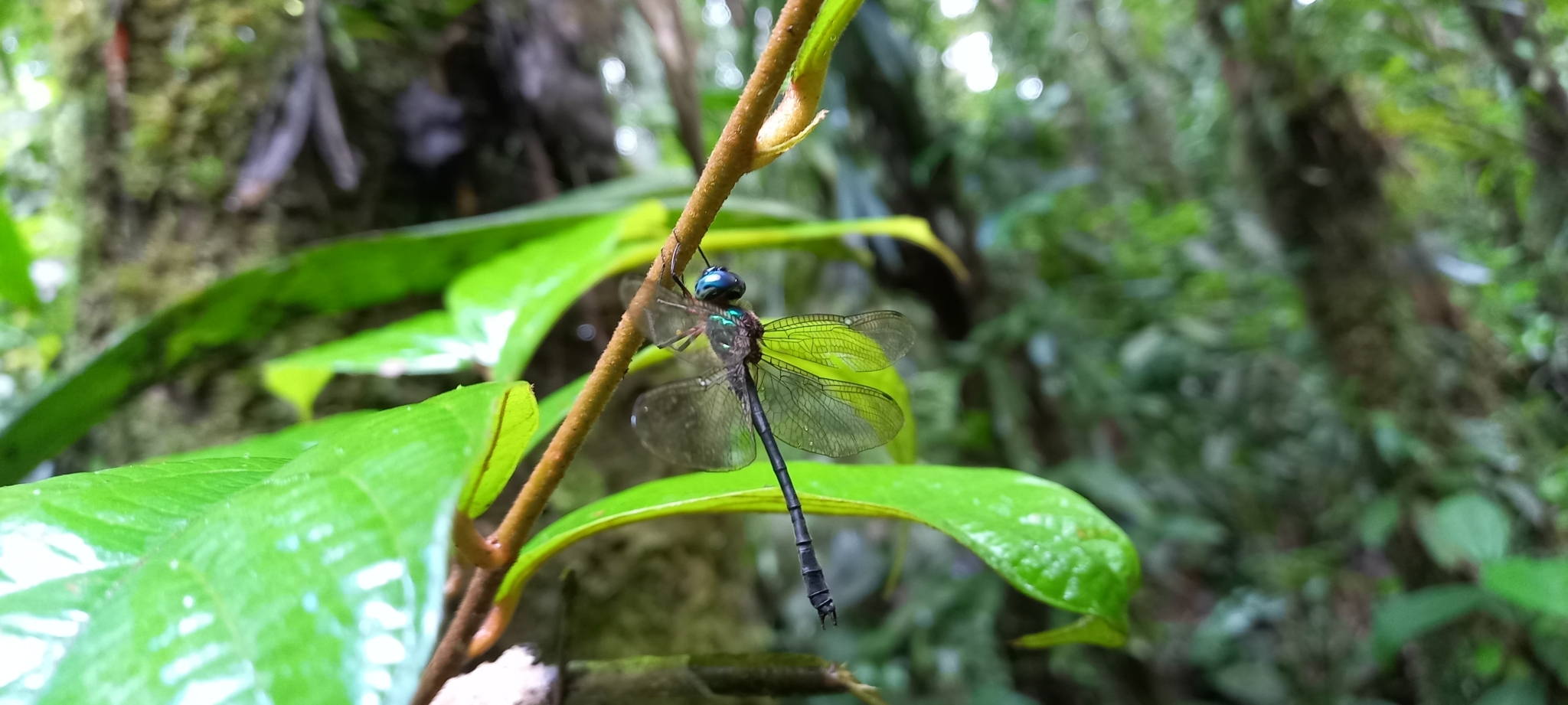
- Neocordulia batesi

Scientific classification
- Kingdom: Animalia
- Phylum: Arthropoda
- Clade: Pancrustacea
- Class: Insecta
- Order: Odonata
- Infraorder: Anisoptera
- Superfamily: Libelluloidea
- Family: Idomacromiidae
- Genus: Neocordulia; Selys, 1882

Species
- Neocordulia androgynis; Neocordulia batesi; Neocordulia biancoi; Neocordulia campana; Neocordulia carlochagasi; Neocordulia caudacuta; Neocordulia fiorentini; Neocordulia gaucha; Neocordulia griphus; Neocordulia machadoi; Neocordulia mambucabensis; Neocordulia matutuensis; Neocordulia maurocostai; Neocordulia pedroi; Neocordulia santacatarinensis; Neocordulia setifera; Neocordulia volxemi

= Neocordulia =

Genus of dragonflies

Neocordulia is a genus of dragonflies in the family Idomacromiidae. The genus comprises 17 described species distributed from southern Central America to southeastern Brazil, where they inhabit forest streams and other freshwater habitats.

== Description ==
Neocordulia are medium-sized dragonflies with brilliant metallic green to bronze bodies, transparent wings and bright green eyes. The abdomen is slender and the wings have a dense network of veins, characters that distinguish the genus from several related Neotropical dragonflies.

== Distribution and habitat ==
Species of Neocordulia occur from southern Central America through northern and central South America to southeastern Brazil.

Most species inhabit forest streams and rivers, although some are also found along forest trails and in secondary forest. The larvae develop in slow-flowing streams, typically among sandy substrates, submerged roots and accumulated leaf litter. Adults are fast-flying and infrequently collected, probably because they spend much of their time above forest streams and within the canopy.

== Taxonomic history ==
Neocordulia was established by Selys in 1882 for a group of Neotropical dragonflies that he considered distinct from Gomphomacromia, transferring several species that he had previously included in that genus.

Geijskes (1970) provided the first modern diagnosis of the genus, clarifying its distinguishing characters and its relationships with other Neotropical corduliids. May (1991) subsequently revised the genus, recognising eight species arranged in two subgenera based on adult morphology and describing the new species Neocordulia griphus. Since then, numerous additional species have been described from South America, considerably expanding the known diversity of the genus.

The genus was formerly placed in the family Corduliidae. Following an interim period in which it was treated as incertae sedis within Libelluloidea, Goodman and colleagues (2025) placed Neocordulia in the family Idomacromiidae.

== Species ==
The following species are currently recognised in the genus Neocordulia:

- Neocordulia androgynis (Selys, 1871)
- Neocordulia batesi (Selys, 1871)
- Neocordulia biancoi Rácenis, 1970
- Neocordulia campana May & Knopf, 1988
- Neocordulia carlochagasi Santos, 1967
- Neocordulia caudacuta De Marmels, 2008
- Neocordulia fiorentini Costa & Machado, 2007
- Neocordulia gaucha Costa & Machado, 2007
- Neocordulia griphus May, 1992
- Neocordulia machadoi Santos, Costa & Carriço, 2010
- Neocordulia mambucabensis Costa & Santos, 2000
- Neocordulia matutuensis Machado, 2005
- Neocordulia maurocostai De Marmels, 2024
- Neocordulia pedroi Costa, Carriço & Santos, 2010
- Neocordulia santacatarinensis Costa, Ravanello & Souza-Franco, 2008
- Neocordulia setifera (Hagen in Selys, 1871)
- Neocordulia volxemi (Selys, 1874)

== Etymology ==
The generic name Neocordulia presumably combines the Greek νέος (neos, "new") with the genus name Cordulia, likely reflecting Selys' recognition of the group as a distinct lineage closely related to Cordulia.
