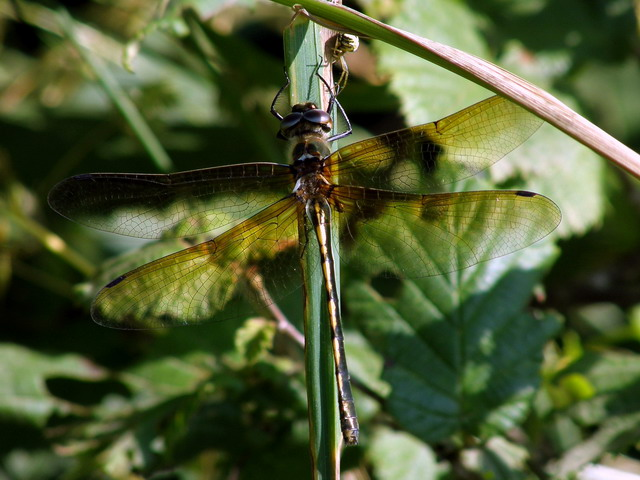

Conservation status
- Least Concern (IUCN 3.1)

Scientific classification
- Kingdom: Animalia
- Phylum: Arthropoda
- Clade: Pancrustacea
- Class: Insecta
- Order: Odonata
- Infraorder: Anisoptera
- Superfamily: Libelluloidea
- Family: Idomacromiidae
- Genus: Oxygastra; Selys, 1871
- Species: O. curtisii

Binomial name
- Oxygastra curtisii (Dale, 1834)

Synonyms
- Cordulia curtisii Dale, 1834; Libellula nitens Fonscolombe, 1837

= Orange-spotted emerald =

Species of dragonfly

The orange-spotted emerald, Oxygastra curtisii, is a dragonfly in the family Idomacromiidae. It is the only species of the genus Oxygastra.

The species is native to western and southern Europe, where it inhabits slow-flowing rivers and streams with well-vegetated banks. It is a bronzy-green dragonfly with bright green eyes and a row of yellow-orange spots along the abdomen.

== Description ==
Orange-spotted emerald is a medium-sized dragonfly, about 53 mm in length. It has bright green eyes and a bronzy-green body with a series of yellow to orange spots along the upper surface of the abdomen, giving rise to its common name. The tenth abdominal segment of the male is prolonged into a downward-curving point, a characteristic noted by Selys when he established the genus Oxygastra in 1871.

The wings are transparent, although females often have a pale amber wash at their bases. The sexes differ in the shape of the terminal abdominal segments, with females having a shorter abdomen and a small vulvar scale used during egg-laying.

== Distribution and habitat ==
Orange-spotted emerald is native to western and southern Europe, where it occurs from the Iberian Peninsula east to Italy and parts of central Europe. It has disappeared from parts of its former range, including Great Britain and the Netherlands, but remains widespread elsewhere and is currently assessed as Least Concern by the IUCN.

It inhabits slow-flowing rivers and streams bordered by riparian woodland, particularly where flooded tree roots provide habitat for the larvae. The species also breeds in some standing waters, including oxbow lakes, abandoned gravel pits and other well-oxygenated pools connected to river systems.

== Conservation ==
Oxygastra curtisii is assessed as Least Concern by the IUCN, although it has declined across parts of its range and has disappeared from several countries, including the United Kingdom, the Netherlands, Germany and Luxembourg.

The principal threats are deterioration of water quality, modification of river channels, removal of riparian vegetation, increasing summer drought associated with climate change and, in some rivers, the spread of invasive crayfish species that share the larval habitat.

The species is listed in Annexes II and IV of the European Union Habitats Directive and in Appendix II of the Bern Convention. Conservation measures focus on maintaining good water quality, preserving natural river structure and riparian woodland, and limiting the spread of invasive crayfish.

=== Invasive crayfish ===
Larvae occupy flooded root systems along river banks, habitats that are also used by several introduced crayfish species. The disappearance of the dragonfly from the Our River on the Germany–Luxembourg border has been linked to the establishment of the invasive signal crayfish, although the extent of this impact elsewhere remains uncertain.

=== Status in Britain ===
Orange-spotted emerald was formerly recorded from two areas in southern England: the River Stour and Moors River in east Dorset, and the River Tamar in Devon. It became regionally extinct during the twentieth century, principally as a result of deteriorating river water quality caused by pollution.

== Taxonomic history ==
The species was first described by James Charles Dale in 1834 as Cordulia curtisii.

In 1871, Selys established the genus Oxygastra with Cordulia curtisii as its type species, recognising it as distinct from other emerald dragonflies on the basis of wing venation and the structure of the male abdomen.

The genus was subsequently placed in the family Corduliidae for more than a century. Molecular phylogenetic studies later showed that Oxygastra belongs to a distinct evolutionary lineage within Libelluloidea. Following an interim period in which the genus was treated as incertae sedis, Goodman and colleagues (2025) placed it in the family Idomacromiidae.

== Etymology ==
Dale named the species curtisii in honour of the English entomologist John Curtis, who had collected the dragonfly at Parley Heath in 1820. Dale explained that he had originally intended Curtis to describe the species himself, but after it remained undescribed for many years, he chose to publish the description and dedicate the name to his friend.
