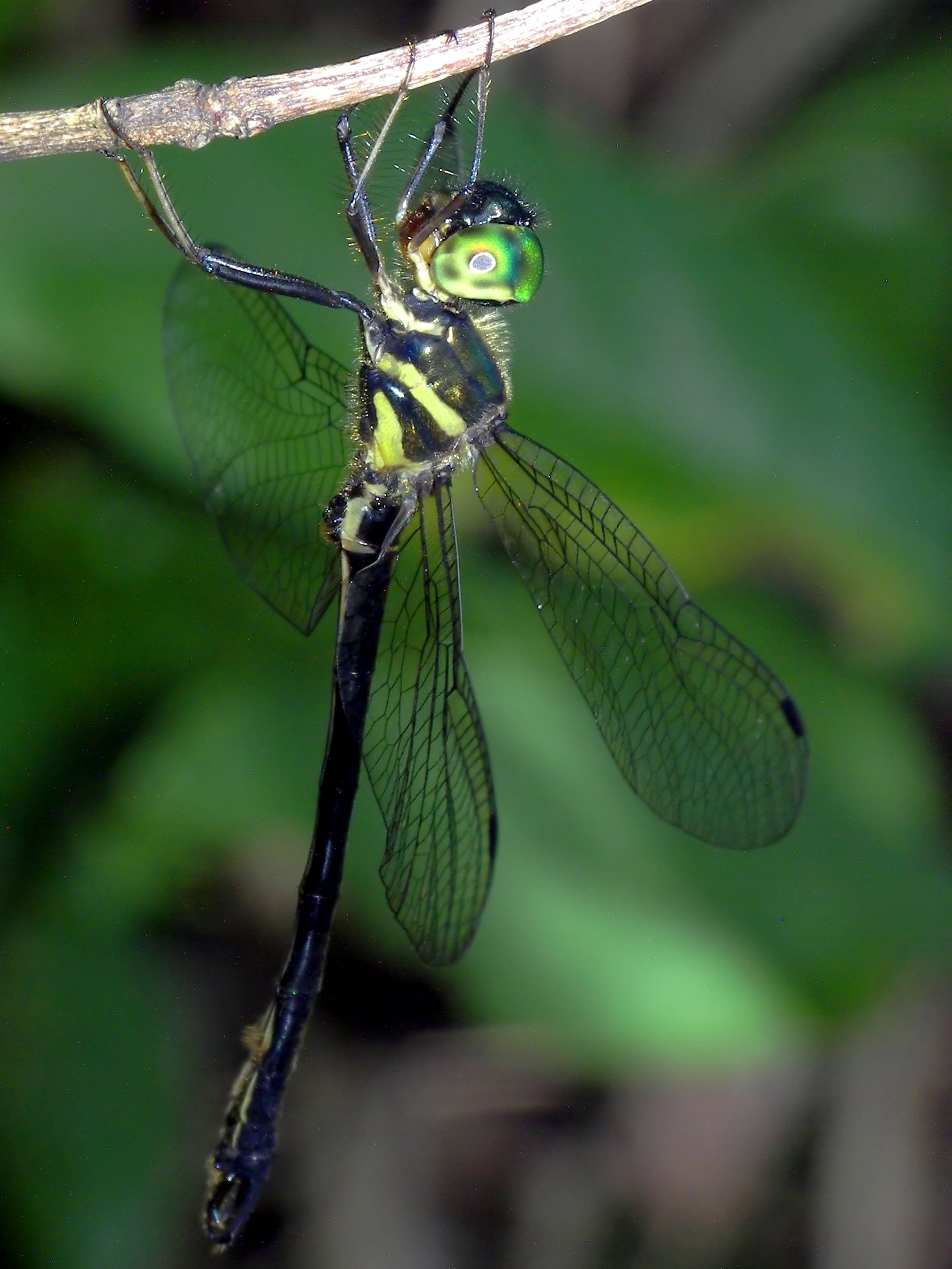
- Idionyx victor

Scientific classification
- Kingdom: Animalia
- Phylum: Arthropoda
- Clade: Pancrustacea
- Class: Insecta
- Order: Odonata
- Infraorder: Anisoptera
- Superfamily: Libelluloidea
- Family: Idionychidae; Tillyard & Fraser, 1940
- Genus: Idionyx; Hagen, 1867
- Distribution of Idionyx

= Idionyx =

Idionychidae Temporal range: Miocene–Present

Genus of dragonflies

Idionyx is a genus of dragonflies and the only genus in the family Idionychidae. The genus comprises about 30 recognised species distributed from the Himalayas and the Western Ghats of India through Southeast Asia to southern China, Taiwan, Japan, the Philippines and the Greater Sunda Islands. They inhabit shaded forest streams and are characterised by their metallic green bodies, relatively large heads and long legs.

The genus was formerly placed within the family Corduliidae, but molecular phylogenetic studies have shown it to represent a distinct evolutionary lineage within the superfamily Libelluloidea.

== Description ==
Idionyx are medium-sized dragonflies with metallic green or bronze bodies, relatively large heads, small thoraces and long, slender abdomens. The legs are long, the wings are usually clear, and females of many species have an amber patch at the base of the wings.

The males possess highly specialised appendages, while females have a distinctive vesicle in place of an ovipositor and deposit their eggs directly into damp sand or mud beside streams.

Species of Idionyx are commonly known as shadow emeralds, reflecting both their metallic green colouration and their preference for shaded forest habitats.

== Distribution and habitat ==
Idionyx species are distributed from the Himalayas and the Western Ghats of India through southern China and Southeast Asia to the Philippines and the Greater Sunda Islands. Most species have restricted distributions, although a few, such as Idionyx yolanda, are more widespread.

They inhabit shaded forest streams, particularly in hilly and mountainous regions. Adults are elusive and are seldom encountered far from dense forest. They have a weak, erratic flight and are most active under low-light conditions, including at dawn, dusk, before rainfall and during overcast weather. Larvae develop in flowing streams, while females deposit their eggs directly into damp sand or mud along stream margins.

== Taxonomic history ==
Idionyx was established by Hagen in 1867 for a distinctive group of Asian dragonflies characterised by their large heads, slender bodies and specialised appendages.

Tillyard and Fraser (1940) recognised the distinctiveness of the genus by placing it in the subfamily Idionychinae. They considered it a tropical offshoot of the corduliid lineage and included the genera Idionyx and Idiophya. Fraser (1957) retained the subfamily within a broadly defined Corduliidae, refining its diagnosis while continuing to recognise its unusual combination of morphological characters.

Although molecular studies supported the distinctiveness of Idionyx, Dijkstra and colleagues (2013) considered the genus incertae sedis within Libelluloidea pending broader sampling of former corduliid genera. Goodman and colleagues (2025) subsequently recognised Idionychidae as a separate family, with Idionyx as its only living genus, reflecting its position as an independent evolutionary lineage within Libelluloidea.

== Species ==
The following species are currently placed in Idionyx:

- Idionyx asahinai Karube, 2011
- Idionyx carinatus Fraser, 1926
- Idionyx claudia Ris, 1912
- Idionyx corona Fraser, 1921
- Idionyx galeatus Fraser, 1924
- Idionyx gomantakensis Subramanian, Rangnekar & Naik, 2013
- Idionyx iida Hämäläinen, 2002
- Idionyx imbricatus Fraser, 1926
- Idionyx intricatus Fraser, 1926
- Idionyx laidlawi Fraser, 1936
- Idionyx minimus Fraser, 1931
- Idionyx montanus Karsch, 1891
- Idionyx murcia Lieftinck, 1971
- Idionyx nadganiensis Fraser, 1924
- Idionyx nilgiriensis (Fraser, 1918)
- Idionyx optatus Selys, 1878
- Idionyx orchestra Lieftinck, 1953
- Idionyx periyashola Fraser, 1939
- Idionyx philippa Ris, 1912
- Idionyx rhinoceroides Fraser, 1934
- Idionyx saffronatus Fraser, 1921
- Idionyx salva (Needham & Gyger, 1937)
- Idionyx selysi Fraser, 1926
- Idionyx stevensi Fraser, 1924
- Idionyx thailandicus Hämäläinen, 1985
- Idionyx travancorensis Fraser, 1931
- Idionyx unguiculatus Fraser, 1926
- Idionyx victor Hämäläinen, 1991 – dancing shadow-emerald
- Idionyx yolanda Selys, 1871
- Idionyx yunnanensis Zhou, Wang, Shuai & Liu, 1994

== Fossil record ==
The fossil record of Idionychidae is limited to the Miocene, with fossils known from a single locality at Vishnevaya Balka Creek in Stavropol Krai, southern Russia.

The following fossil genus and species are currently placed in the family Idionychidae:

- †Mioidionyx Nel, Petrulevičius & Jarzembowski, 2005
  - †Mioidionyx stavropolensis Nel, Petrulevičius & Jarzembowski, 2005

== Etymology ==
The family name Idionychidae is derived from the type genus Idionyx, with the zoological suffix -idae denoting a family.

The genus name Idionyx presumably combines the Greek ἴδιος (ídios, "distinct", "peculiar" or "unique") with ὄνυξ (ónyx, "claw"), likely referring to the distinctive claws at the end of the legs that characterise the genus.
