= Idomacromiidae =

Scientific classification
- Kingdom: Animalia
- Phylum: Arthropoda
- Clade: Pancrustacea
- Class: Insecta
- Order: Odonata
- Infraorder: Anisoptera
- Superfamily: Libelluloidea
- Family: Idomacromiidae; Tillyard & Fraser, 1940

Genera
- Idomacromia; Neocordulia; Nesocordulia; Oxygastra; Syncordulia
- Distribution of Idomacromiidae

Family of dragonflies

Idomacromiidae is a family of dragonflies in the superfamily Libelluloidea. It comprises five genera and 37 recognised species distributed across sub-Saharan Africa, Madagascar, southern Europe and the Neotropics.

The family was formerly treated as part of the broadly defined Corduliidae, but molecular phylogenetic studies have shown its genera to represent a distinct evolutionary lineage within Libelluloidea.

== Description ==
Members of the family Idomacromiidae are medium-sized dragonflies with metallic green, bronze or dark colouration. They are characterised by relatively broad wings with dense venation.

Adults are agile fliers, although flight behaviour varies among the genera. Most species inhabit forested streams or rivers, and several are associated with well-shaded habitats. Females lack a typical ovipositor and deposit their eggs directly into water or onto damp substrates along stream margins.

== Distribution and habitat ==
Members of the family Idomacromiidae occur in sub-Saharan Africa, Madagascar, southern Europe and the Neotropics. Individual genera are typically confined to one of these regions, reflecting the family's fragmented geographic distribution.

Most species inhabit streams and rivers, particularly in forested or well-vegetated habitats. Their larvae develop in running water, although the ecology of many species remains poorly known.

== Taxonomic history ==
Tillyard and Fraser established the subfamily Idomacromiinae in 1940 for the African genus Idomacromia, which they regarded as sufficiently distinct from other corduliid dragonflies to warrant a separate subfamily. Fraser (1957) retained the subfamily within a broadly defined Corduliidae and refined its diagnosis.

Subsequent molecular studies demonstrated that several genera traditionally placed within Corduliidae formed distinct evolutionary lineages, but relationships among them remained unresolved. Dijkstra et al. (2013) therefore treated Idomacromia, Neocordulia, Nesocordulia, Oxygastra and Syncordulia as incertae sedis within Libelluloidea pending additional evidence.

Goodman and colleagues (2025) recognised these five genera as the family Idomacromiidae, reflecting their recovery as a distinct lineage within Libelluloidea.

== Classification ==
The following genera are currently placed in the family Idomacromiidae:

- Idomacromia Karsch, 1896 – 3 species
- Neocordulia Selys, 1882 – 17 species
- Nesocordulia McLachlan, 1882 – 12 species
- Oxygastra Selys, 1871 – 1 species
- Syncordulia Selys, 1882 – 4 species

== Etymology ==
The family name Idomacromiidae is derived from the type genus Idomacromia, with the zoological suffix -idae denoting a family.
