= Frederic Charles Fraser =

English entomologist

Frederic Charles Fraser (15 February 1880, in Woolwich – 2 March 1963, in Linwood) was an English entomologist who specialised in Odonata. Following army service in India as a surgeon with the rank of lieutenant colonel, Fraser devoted himself entirely to dragonflies, mostly in the British Museum (Natural History), where his collection is maintained. Fraser's correspondence with A. Eric Gardner is in the library of the Natural History Museum, London. Fraser's correspondence with the Irish odonatologist Niall McNeill is in the Oxford University Museum. He was a fellow of the Royal Entomological Society.

== Selected works ==
- 1933 The Fauna of British India, Including Ceylon and Burma including Burma and Ceylon Odonata. 1. Introduction, Coenagriidae. New Delhi.423pp.
- 1934 The Fauna of British India, Including Ceylon and Burma including Burma and Ceylon Odonata. 2. Agriidae, Gomphidae. New Delhi.398 pp, 120 figures, 1 coloured plate.
- 1936 The Fauna of British India, Including Ceylon and Burma including Burma and Ceylon Odonata. 3. Cordulegasteridae, Aeshnidae, Libellulidae. 461 p.
- 1954 The Origin and Descent of the Order Odonata based on the Evidence of persistent archaic Characters. Proceedings of the Royal Entomological Society of London.Ser.B, 23: 89-95
- 1957 A reclassification of the order Odonata R. Zool. Soc. N.S.W., Sydney, Australia, 155 pp.
- 1960 A handbook of the dragonflies of Australasia: with keys for the identification of all species R. Zool. Soc. N.S.W., Sydney, Australia, 67 pp. + 27 plates.

== Sources ==
- Anon. [F.C. Fraser] Entom. Mon. Mag., 99, 1963, p. 96 including a portrait.
