= List of dragonflies =

List of dragonfly taxa

This is an incomplete list of dragonflies, insects placed in the suborder Anisoptera of the order Odonata. The taxa are arranged by family.

== Suborder Anisoptera ==
=== Family Austropetaliidae ===
- Archipetalia auriculata
- Austropetalia patricia
- Austropetalia tonyana
- Austropetalia victoria
- Eurypetalia altarensis
- Eurypetalia excrescens
- Hypopetalia pestilens
- Ophiopetalia araucana
- Ophiopetalia auregaster
- Ophiopetalia diana
- Ophiopetalia pudu
- Phyllopetalia apollo
- Phyllopetalia stictica
- Rheopetalia apicalis
- Rheopetalia rex

=== Family Cordulegastridae ===
- Anotogaster antehumeralis
- Anotogaster basalis
- Anotogaster chaoi
- Anotogaster cornutifrons
- Anotogaster flaveola
- Anotogaster gregoryi
- Anotogaster klossi
- Anotogaster kuchenbeiseri
- Anotogaster nipalensis
- Anotogaster sakaii
- Anotogaster sieboldii
- Anotogaster xanthoptera
- Cordulegaster annandalei
- Cordulegaster bidentata
- Cordulegaster bilineata
- Cordulegaster boltonii
- Cordulegaster brevistigma
- Cordulegaster diadema
- Cordulegaster diastatops
- Cordulegaster dorsalis
- Cordulegaster erronea
- Cordulegaster helladica
- Cordulegaster heros
- Cordulegaster insignis
- Cordulegaster jinensis
- Cordulegaster lunifera
- Cordulegaster maculata
- Cordulegaster magnifica
- Cordulegaster mzymtae
- Cordulegaster nachitschevanica
- Cordulegaster obliqua
- Cordulegaster orientalis
- Cordulegaster parvistigma
- Cordulegaster pekinensis
- Cordulegaster picta
- Cordulegaster plagionyx
- Cordulegaster princeps
- Cordulegaster sarracenia
- Cordulegaster sayi
- Cordulegaster talaria
- Cordulegaster trinacriae
- Cordulegaster vanbrinkae
- Cordulegaster virginiae
- Neallogaster choui
- Neallogaster hermionae
- Neallogaster latifrons
- Neallogaster ornata
- Neallogaster schmidti

=== Family Corduliidae ===
- Aeschnosoma auripennis
- Aeschnosoma elegans
- Aeschnosoma forcipula
- Aeschnosoma marizae
- Aeschnosoma rustica
- Antipodochlora braueri
- Apocordulia macrops
- Archaeophya adamsi
- Archaeophya magnifica
- Austrocordulia leonardi
- Austrocordulia refracta
- Austrocordulia territoria
- Austrophya mystica
- Cordulephya bidens
- Cordulephya divergens
- Cordulephya montana
- Cordulephya pygmaea
- Cordulia aenea
- Cordulia amurensis
- Cordulia shurtleffii
- Dorocordulia lepida
- Dorocordulia libera
- Epitheca bimaculata
- Epitheca canis
- Epitheca costalis
- Epitheca cynosura
- Epitheca marginata
- Epitheca petechialis
- Epitheca princeps
- Epitheca semiaquea
- Epitheca sepia
- Epitheca spinigera
- Epitheca spinosa
- Epitheca stella
- Gomphomacromia chilensis
- Gomphomacromia fallax
- Gomphomacromia nodisticta
- Gomphomacromia paradoxa
- Guadalca insularis
- Helocordulia selysii
- Helocordulia uhleri
- Hemicordulia affinis
- Hemicordulia africana
- Hemicordulia apoensis
- Hemicordulia armstrongi
- Hemicordulia artemis
- Hemicordulia asahinai
- Hemicordulia asiatica
- Hemicordulia assimilis
- Hemicordulia astridae
- Hemicordulia atrovirens
- Hemicordulia australiae
- Hemicordulia chrysochlora
- Hemicordulia continentalis
- Hemicordulia cupricolor
- Hemicordulia cyclopica
- Hemicordulia edai
- Hemicordulia eduardi
- Hemicordulia ericetorum
- Hemicordulia erico
- Hemicordulia fidelis
- Hemicordulia flava
- Hemicordulia fusiformis
- Hemicordulia grayi
- Hemicordulia haluco
- Hemicordulia hilaris
- Hemicordulia hilbrandi
- Hemicordulia intermedia
- Hemicordulia irregularis
- Hemicordulia jacksoniensis
- Hemicordulia kalliste
- Hemicordulia karnyi
- Hemicordulia koomina
- Hemicordulia leopoldi
- Hemicordulia lompobatang
- Hemicordulia lulico
- Hemicordulia mindana
- Hemicordulia moroensis
- Hemicordulia mumfordi
- Hemicordulia novaehollandiae
- Hemicordulia oceanica
- Hemicordulia ogasawarensis
- Hemicordulia okinawensis
- Hemicordulia olympica
- Hemicordulia pacifica
- Hemicordulia papandayanensis
- Hemicordulia rantemario
- Hemicordulia sambawana
- Hemicordulia silvarum
- Hemicordulia similis
- Hemicordulia smithii
- Hemicordulia superba
- Hemicordulia sylvia
- Hemicordulia tau
- Hemicordulia tenera
- Hemicordulia teramotoi
- Hemicordulia toxopei
- Hemicordulia tuiwawai
- Hemicordulia valevahalo
- Hemicordulia virens
- Hesperocordulia berthoudi
- Heteronaias heterodoxa
- Idionyx burliyarensis
- Idionyx carinata
- Idionyx claudia
- Idionyx corona
- Idionyx galeata
- Idionyx iida
- Idionyx imbricata
- Idionyx intricata
- Idionyx laidlawi
- Idionyx minima
- Idionyx montana
- Idionyx murcia
- Idionyx nadganiensis
- Idionyx nilgiriensis
- Idionyx optata
- Idionyx orchestra
- Idionyx periyashola
- Idionyx philippa
- Idionyx rhinoceroides
- Idionyx saffronata
- Idionyx salva
- Idionyx selysi
- Idionyx stevensi
- Idionyx thailandica
- Idionyx travancorensis
- Idionyx unguiculata
- Idionyx victor
- Idionyx yolanda
- Idionyx yunnanensis
- Idomacromia jillianae
- Idomacromia lieftincki
- Idomacromia proavita
- Lathrocordulia garrisoni
- Lathrocordulia metallica
- Lauromacromia bedei
- Lauromacromia dubitalis
- Lauromacromia flaviae
- Lauromacromia luismoojeni
- Lauromacromia picinguaba
- Libellulosoma minuta
- Macromidia asahinai
- Macromidia atrovirens
- Macromidia donaldi
- Macromidia ellenae
- Macromidia fulva
- Macromidia genialis
- Macromidia hanzhouensis
- Macromidia ishidai
- Macromidia kelloggi
- Macromidia rapida
- Macromidia samal
- Macromidia shiehae
- Metaphya elongata
- Metaphya micans
- Metaphya stueberi
- Metaphya tillyardi
- Micromidia atrifrons
- Micromidia convergens
- Micromidia rodericki
- Navicordulia amazonica
- Navicordulia atlantica
- Navicordulia errans
- Navicordulia kiautai
- Navicordulia leptostyla
- Navicordulia longistyla
- Navicordulia mielkei
- Navicordulia miersi
- Navicordulia nitens
- Navicordulia vagans
- Neocordulia androgynis
- Neocordulia batesi
- Neocordulia biancoi
- Neocordulia campana
- Neocordulia carlochagasi
- Neocordulia caudacuta
- Neocordulia fiorentini
- Neocordulia gaucha
- Neocordulia griphus
- Neocordulia mambucabensis
- Neocordulia matutuensis
- Neocordulia santacatarinensis
- Neocordulia setifera
- Neocordulia volxemi
- Neophya rutherfordi
- Nesocordulia flavicauda
- Nesocordulia malgassica
- Nesocordulia mascarenica
- Nesocordulia rubricauda
- Nesocordulia spinicauda
- Nesocordulia villiersi
- Neurocordulia alabamensis
- Neurocordulia michaeli
- Neurocordulia molesta
- Neurocordulia obsoleta
- Neurocordulia virginiensis
- Neurocordulia xanthosoma
- Neurocordulia yamaskanensis
- Oxygastra curtisii
- Paracordulia sericea
- Pentathemis membranulata
- Pseudocordulia circularis
- Pseudocordulia elliptica
- Rialla villosa
- Santosia machadoi
- Santosia marshalli
- Santosia newtoni
- Somatochlora albicincta
- Somatochlora alpestris
- Somatochlora arctica
- Somatochlora borisi
- Somatochlora brevicincta
- Somatochlora calverti
- Somatochlora cingulata
- Somatochlora clavata
- Somatochlora daviesi
- Somatochlora dido
- Somatochlora elongata
- Somatochlora ensigera
- Somatochlora filosa
- Somatochlora flavomaculata
- Somatochlora forcipata
- Somatochlora franklini
- Somatochlora georgiana
- Somatochlora graeseri
- Somatochlora hineana
- Somatochlora hudsonica
- Somatochlora incurvata
- Somatochlora kennedyi
- Somatochlora linearis
- Somatochlora lingyinensis
- Somatochlora margarita
- Somatochlora meridionalis
- Somatochlora metallica
- Somatochlora minor
- Somatochlora nepalensis
- Somatochlora ozarkensis
- Somatochlora provocans
- Somatochlora sahlbergi
- Somatochlora semicircularis
- Somatochlora septentrionalis
- Somatochlora shanxiensis
- Somatochlora taiwana
- Somatochlora tenebrosa
- Somatochlora uchidai
- Somatochlora viridiaenea
- Somatochlora walshii
- Somatochlora whitehousei
- Somatochlora williamsoni
- Syncordulia gracilis
- Syncordulia venator
- Williamsonia fletcheri
- Williamsonia lintneri

=== Family Neopetaliidae ===
- Neopetalia punctata

=== Family Petaluridae ===
- Petalura gigantea
- Petalura hesperia
- Petalura ingentissima
- Petalura litorea
- Petalura pulcherrima
- Phenes raptor
- Tachopteryx thoreyi
- Tanypteryx hageni
- Tanypteryx pryeri
- Uropetala carovei
- Uropetala chiltoni
