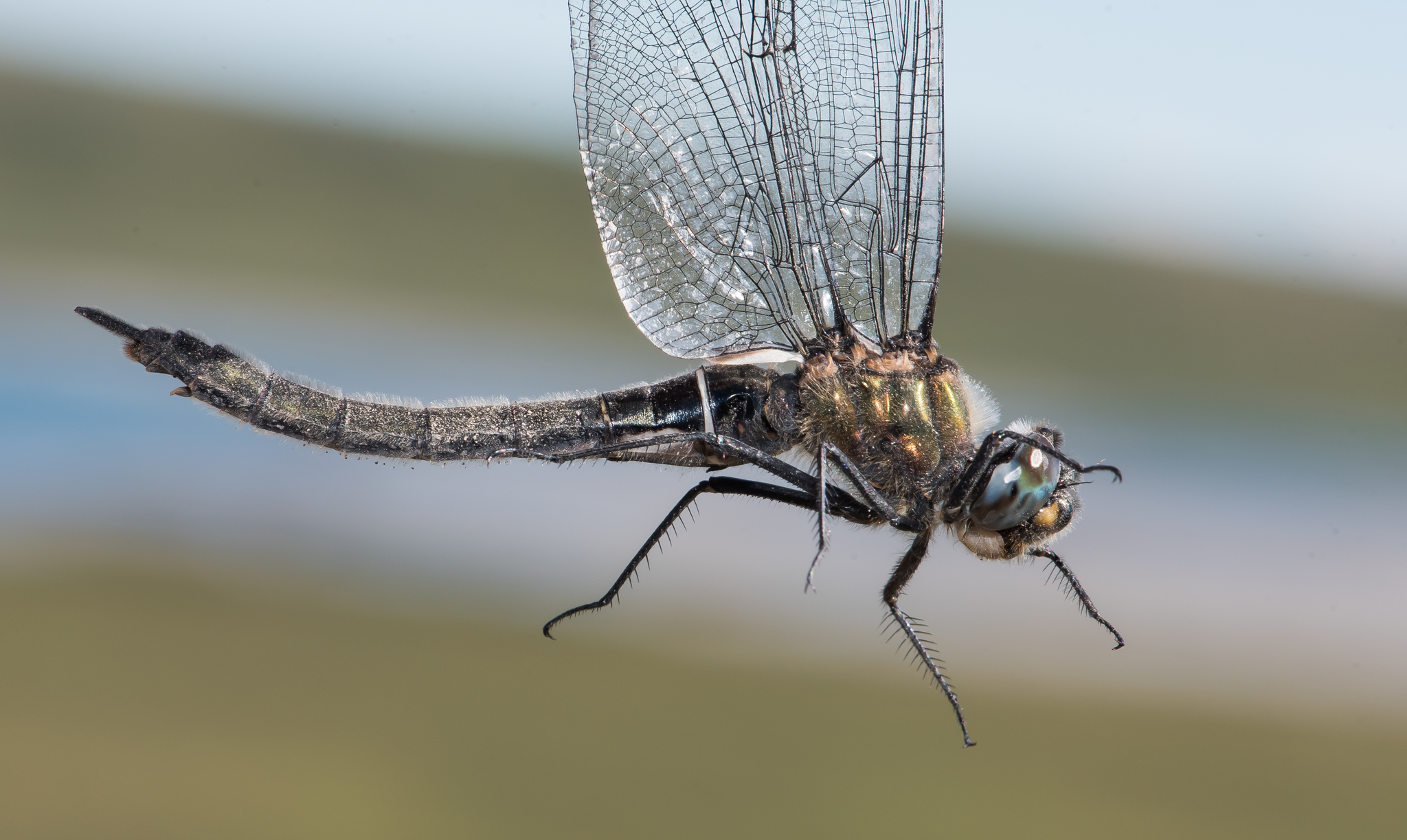
- adult female

Conservation status
- Least Concern (IUCN 3.1) Global

- Near Threatened (IUCN 3.1) Europe

Scientific classification
- Kingdom: Animalia
- Phylum: Arthropoda
- Clade: Pancrustacea
- Class: Insecta
- Order: Odonata
- Infraorder: Anisoptera
- Superfamily: Libelluloidea
- Family: Corduliidae
- Genus: Somatochlora
- Species: S. sahlbergi

Binomial name
- Somatochlora sahlbergi Trybom, 1889

Synonyms
- Somatochlora theeli Trybom, 1889; Somatochlora walkeri Kennedy, 1917

= Somatochlora sahlbergi =

Species of dragonfly

Somatochlora sahlbergi, the treeline emerald, is a species of dragonfly in the family Corduliidae. It is found at high latitudes across northern Eurasia and North America, and occurs farther north than any other dragonfly.

== Taxonomy ==
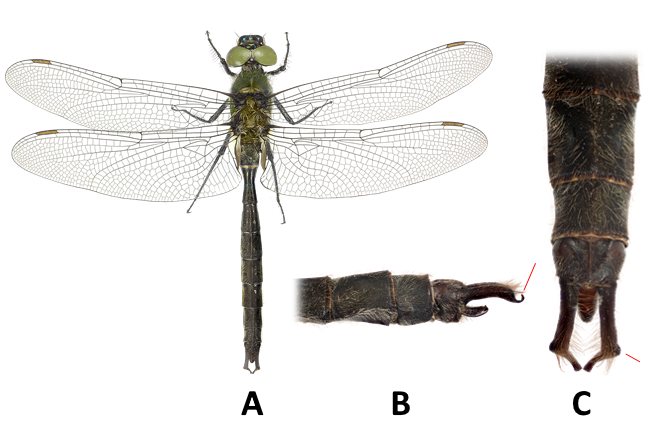
male specimen

Somatochlora sahlbergi was first scientifically described in 1889 by Swedish entomologist Filip Trybom, based on four specimens collected on an 1876 expedition to the Yenisei River. The species was named after Finnish entomologist Johan Reinhold Sahlberg.

In 1917, American entomologist Clarence Hamilton Kennedy described a new species Somatochlora walkeri based on a male specimen from Alaska and a female specimen from Saskatchewan, naming it after Canadian entomologist Edmund Murton Walker. In his 1925 monograph on the genus Somatochlora in North America, Walker determined that his namesake species was actually a synonym of S. sahlbergi, and that the Saskatchewan specimen did not belong to this species.

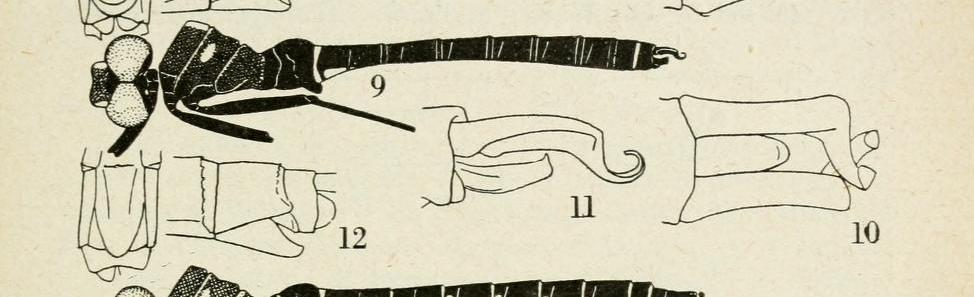
Illustrations from the 1917 description of S. walkeri. The species was later determined to be synonymous with S. sahlbergi, and note that fig 12. is misidentified and is not S. sahlbergi

S. sahlbergi has no close relatives within the genus, being the sister species to a clade consisting of most other species of Somatochlora. It is known to hybridise with Somatochlora albicincta and Somatochlora hudsonica in Alaska and Yukon.

Despite its broad distribution, genetic studies reveal that there is very little genetic variation among populations of S. sahlbergi, and the species interbreeds across its entire range.

== Description ==
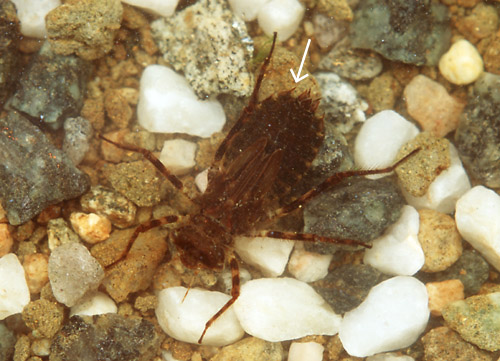
Larva

Somatochlora sahlbergi adults are medium-sized (about 4.8 cm (1.9 in) long) dragonflies with dark, metallic green bodies and transparent wings, much like other species of Somatochlora. Unlike some other species in the genus, there is very little paler yellow marking on the thorax and abdomen. The body is covered in a dense coat of setae. The shape of the male cerci, on the tip of the abdomen, is distinctive.

The larva is dark reddish-brown or orange-brown on top, and paler below, and also has a dense coat of setae. Some sources indicate that the larva has long lateral spines on the 8th and 9th abdominal segments, but it is not clear if this is consistent across the species' range.

== Distribution ==
The distribution of Somatochlora sahlbergi is somewhat poorly known, with under 100 specimens known worldwide. The species is found across northern portions of Norway, Sweden, Finland, Russia, and Alaska. In Canada, it is known from Yukon and Northwest Territories, but has not been found anywhere east of the Mackenzie River and may be absent from e.g. Nunavut and Quebec. Reports from Kazakhstan and southern portions of Russia are erroneous.

The species occurs further north than any other species of dragonfly or damselfly, and the southern limit of its breeding range, typically coinciding with the northern treeline, is to the north of most North American and Eurasian dragonflies. Locations where the species is found typically have annual mean temperatures under 0 °C (32 °F), and annual mean rainfall under 450 mm (18 in).

== Life History ==
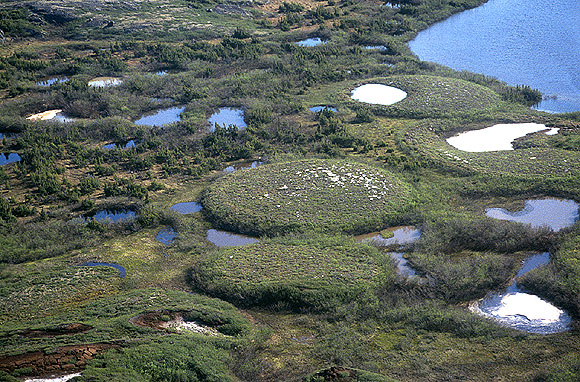
Somatochlora sahlbergi is associated with palsa in the European portion of its range.

Somatochlora sahlbergi is found at pools, ponds and small lakes near treeline and in fens and bogs. Pools are typically lined with sedges and contain aquatic mosses, and may be underlain by permafrost. The species has been observed in Siberia in clear, cold, slow-moving water surrounded by forest, but this habitat has not been noted in North America. In Fennoscandia, S. sahlbergi may be closely associated with palsa mires. Larvae are found in the pools, while adults fly around the surrounding habitats.

Larvae prey upon zooplankton and aquatic insects, while adults feed on flying insects. Adults are most active in the afternoon, and do not fly at night, in shade, or in inclement weather.

Males patrol breeding sites searching for females. When a female is found, males grab the female by the head, with copulation occurring in nearby vegetation. Females lay eggs in open water away from the shoreline. It likely takes up to 4-5 years for larvae to mature due to the short summer season in the breeding range of this species.

== Conservation ==
The species is globally ranked as least concern by the IUCN and as apparently secure (G4) by NatureServe. In its North American range, the species is ranked as S1 (critically imperiled) in the Northwest Territories. In Europe, it is classified as Near Threatened. The species may be at risk due to climate change.
