= Harry P. Leu Gardens =

- Mizell-Leu House Historic District
- U.S. National Register of Historic Places
- U.S. Historic district
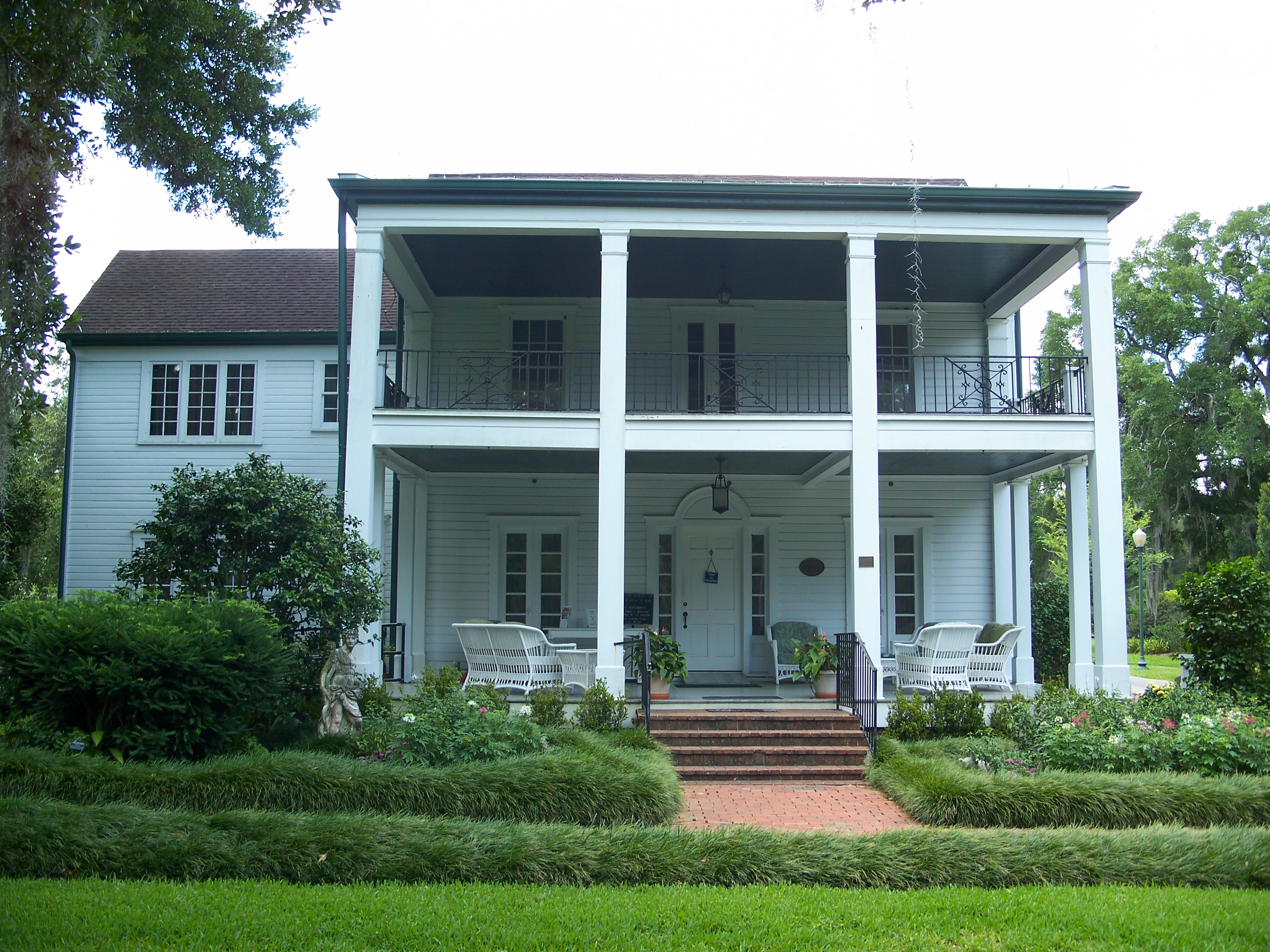

- Location within Florida Location within the United States
- Interactive map of Mizell-Leu House Historic District
- Location: 1920 North Forest Avenue, Orlando, Florida 32803
- Coordinates: 28°34′2.58″N 81°21′26.36″W
- Area: 15 acres (61,000 m^{2})
- Built: 1858
- Architect: John T. Mizell
- Website: Official website
- NRHP reference No.: 94001495
- Added to NRHP: December 29, 1994

The Harry P. Leu Gardens are semi-tropical and tropical gardens at 1920 North Forest Avenue in Orlando, Florida, United States. The gardens contain nearly 50 acres (200,000 m^{2}) of landscaped grounds and lakes, with trails shaded by 200-year-old oaks and forests of camellias. They are open to the public.

A 15-acre (61,000 m^{2}) section of the park, known as the Mizell-Leu House Historic District (or Leu Botanical Gardens and Leu House Museum), was designated a historic district on December 29, 1994. According to the National Register of Historic Places, it contains 3 historic buildings.

== History ==
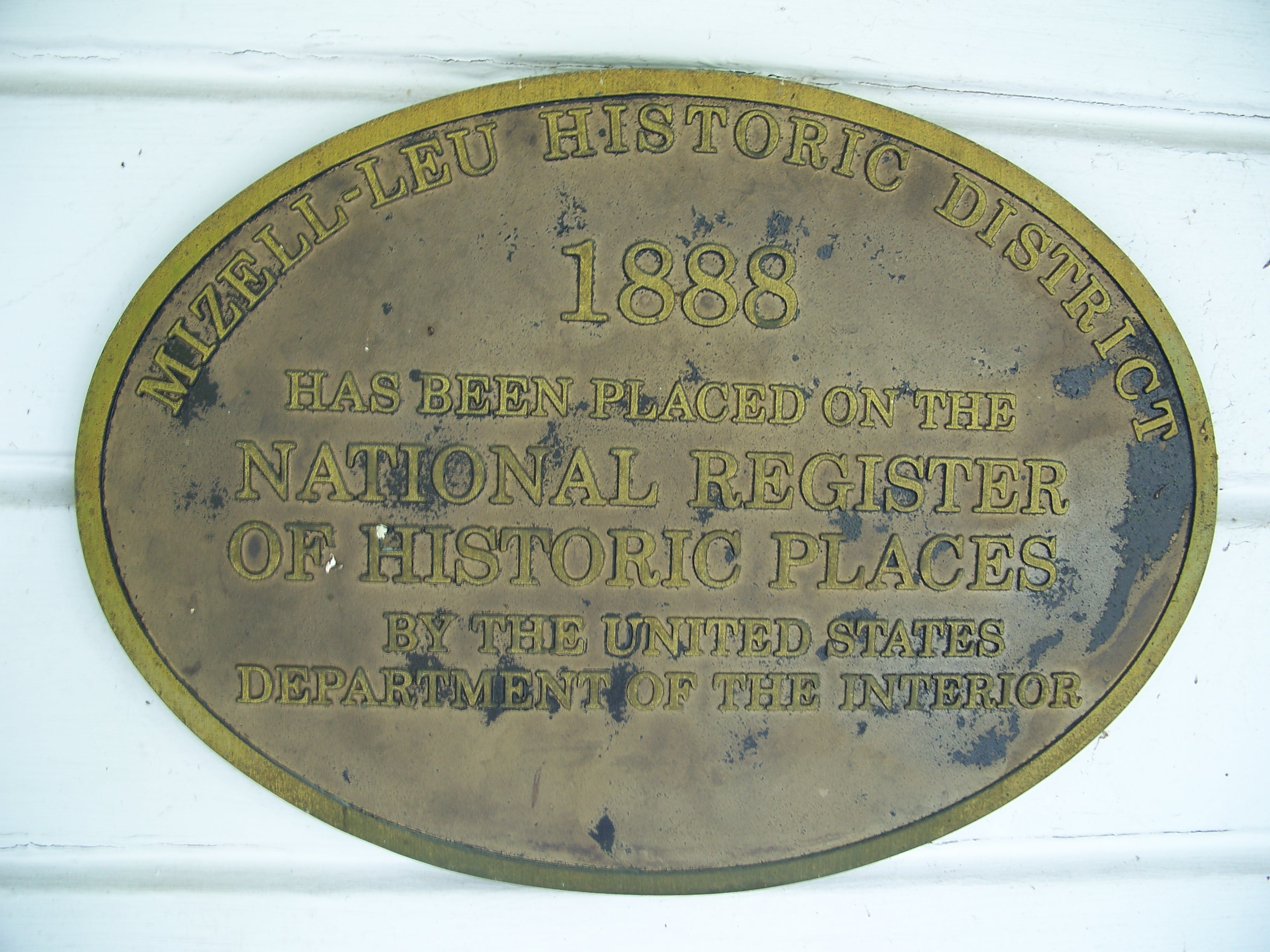

The Leu Gardens were started by Mr. and Mrs. Harry P. Leu, who in 1936 purchased Leu House and 40 acres (160,000 m^{2}) of land. The Leus traveled all over the world and brought back many exotic plants and many varieties (240) of camellias for their gardens.

In 1961, the Leus deeded the house and the gardens to the City of Orlando. Mr. Leu died in 1977.

== Site ==
The land on which the gardens were built is primarily severely drained, quickly to very quickly permeable sand with several inches of dark gray topsoil over about 5 feet of yellow subsoil (Candler soil series). Human soil modification has resulted in 40% of the Gardens being categorized as Urban Land, with no official soil series assigned. On rare occasions, naturally damp soils are discovered.

At the heart of the gardens is Harry and Mary Jane Leu's home, known as the Leu House Museum, which has been restored and is on the National Historical Register. Guided tours of the Leu House, illustrating turn-of-the century Florida living, are available on the hour and the half-hour (times subject to change).

== Flora ==
Leu Gardens is located in USDA climate zone 9b. The mild subtropical climate allows for a mix of temperate and tropical plants. The gardens are known for their extensive collections of aroids, azaleas, bamboo, bananas, bromeliads, camellias, citrus, conifers, crepe myrtles, cycads, ferns, flowering shrubs, flowering trees, gingers, heliconias, hibiscus and mallows, magnolias, ornamental grasses, palms, perennials, roses, trees, and vines.

== Gallery ==
The Harry Leu House in Leu Gardens.

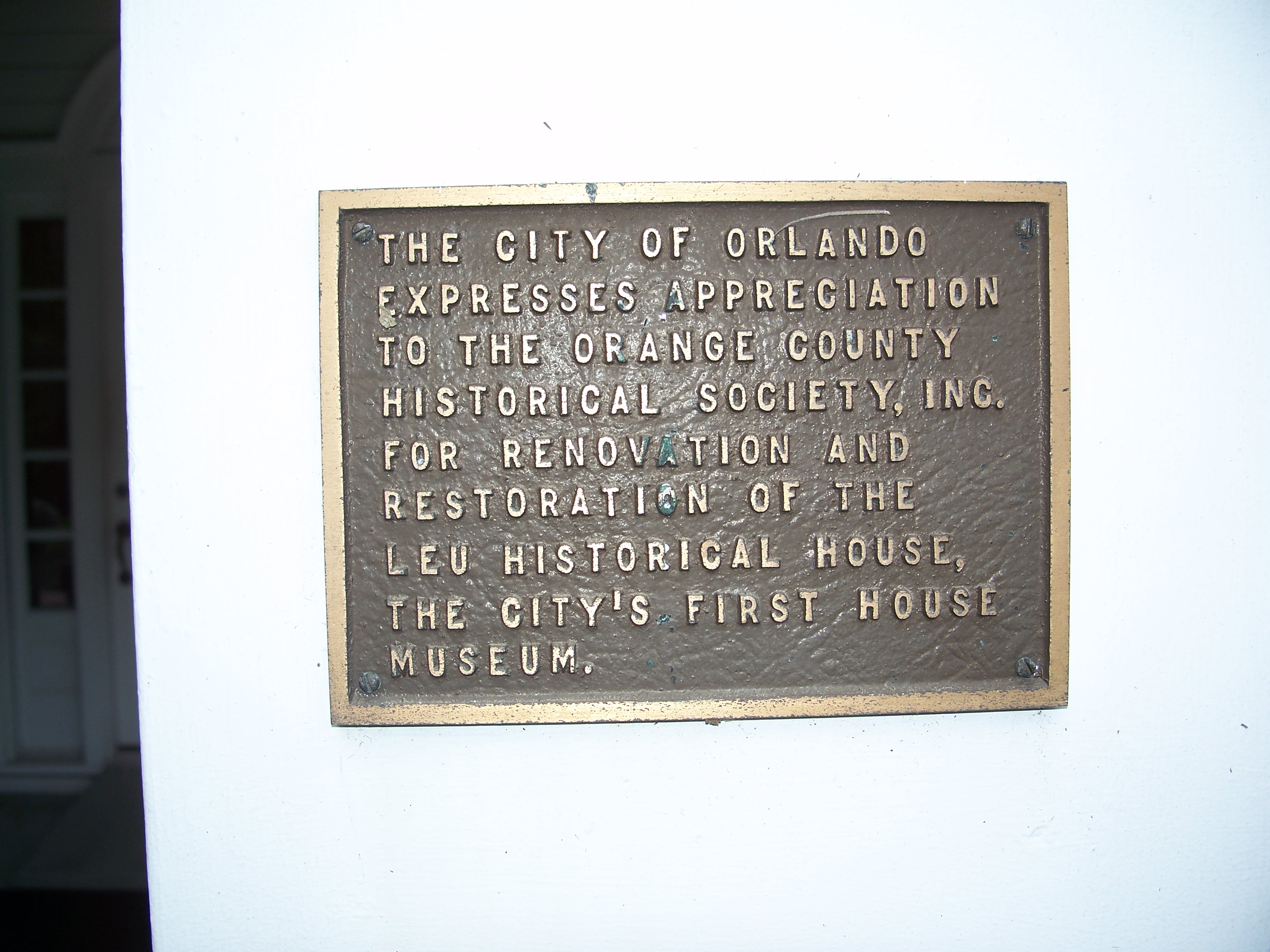
Plaque from the City of Orlando.

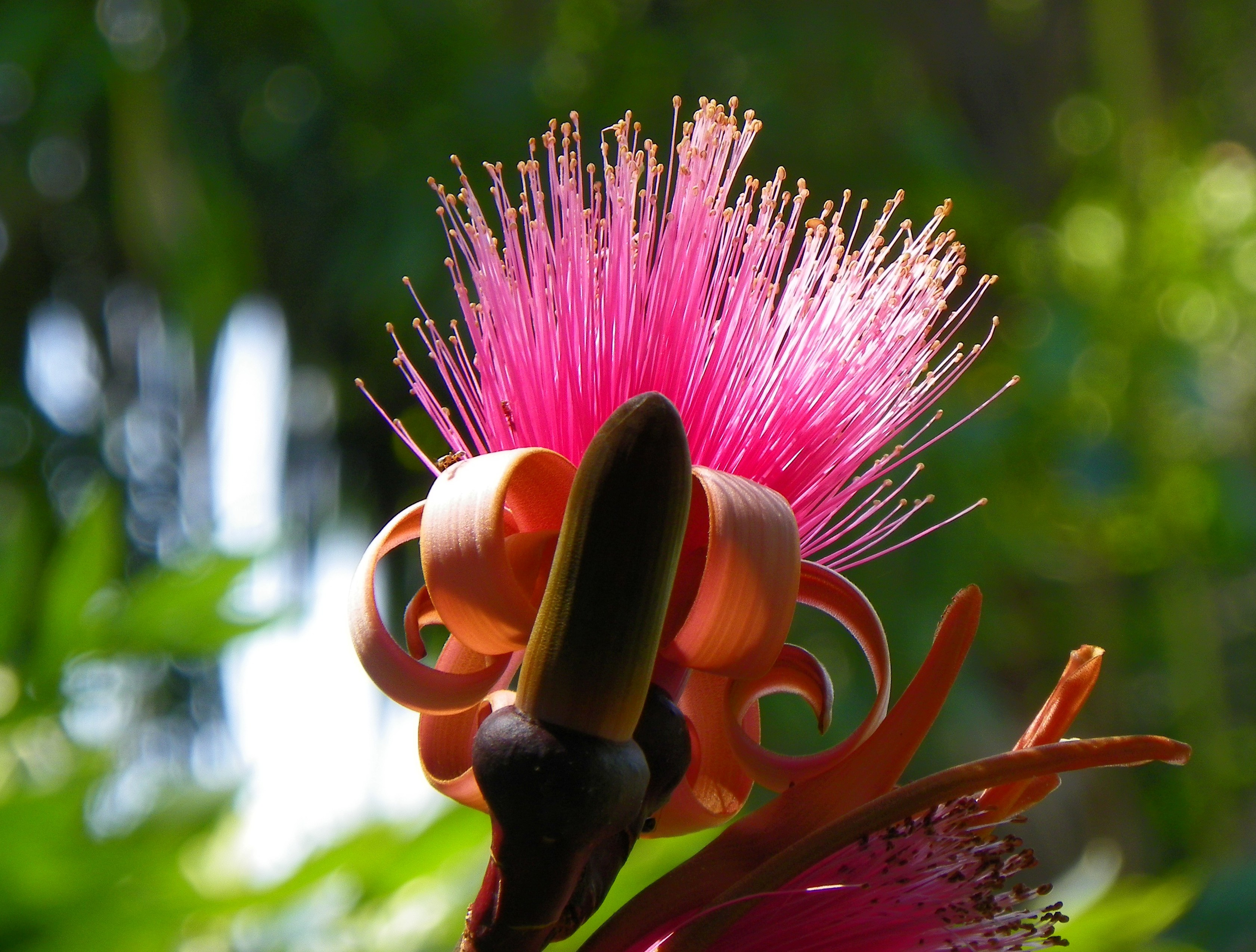
Pseudobombax ellipticum.

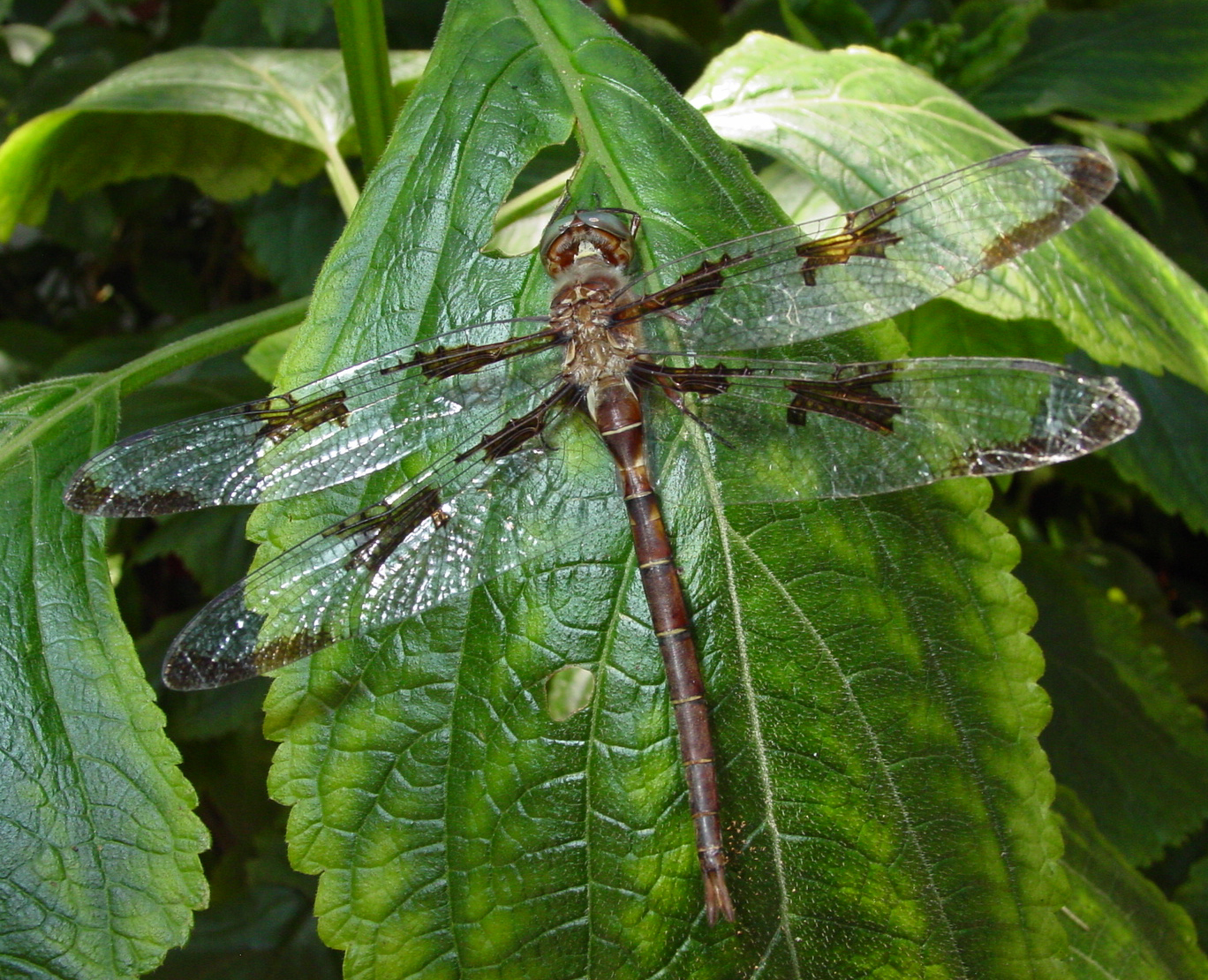
Epitheca princeps on a plant in the garden.

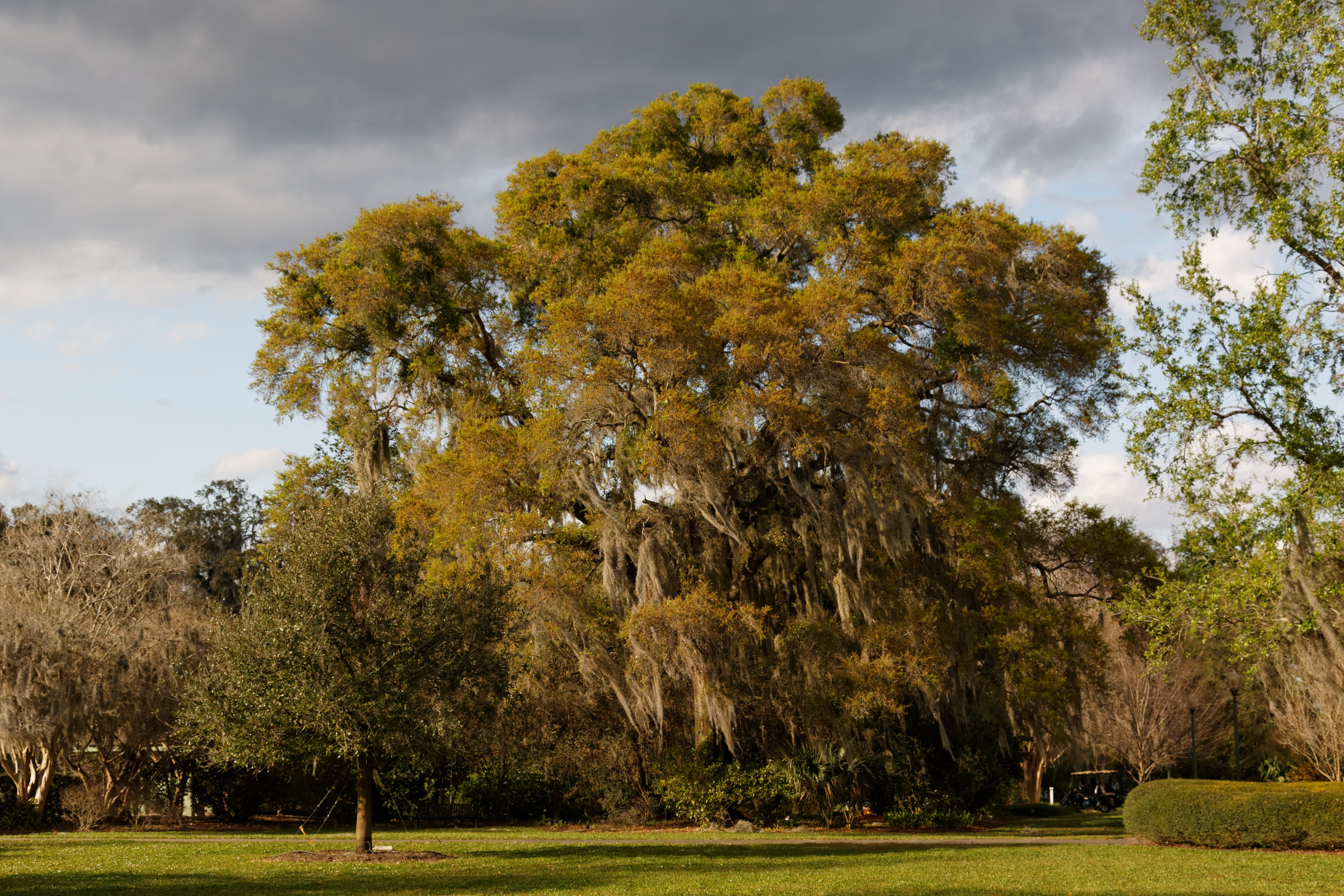
A part of the gardens.

== See also ==
- List of botanical gardens in the United States
