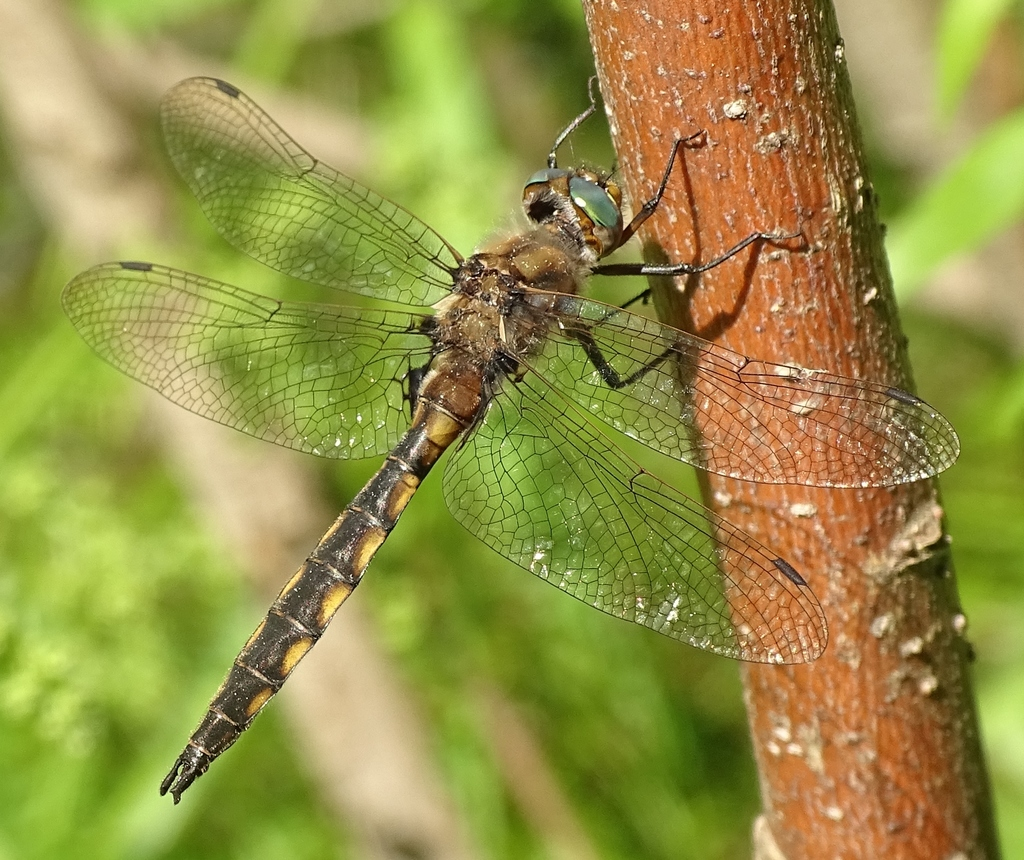

Conservation status
- Least Concern (IUCN 3.1)

Scientific classification
- Kingdom: Animalia
- Phylum: Arthropoda
- Class: Insecta
- Order: Odonata
- Infraorder: Anisoptera
- Family: Corduliidae
- Genus: Epitheca
- Species: E. canis

Binomial name
- Epitheca canis (McLachlan, 1886)

= Epitheca canis =

Species of dragonfly

Epitheca canis, the beaverpond baskettail, is a species of emerald dragonfly in the family Corduliidae. It is found in North America.

The IUCN conservation status of Epitheca canis is "LC", least concern, with no immediate threat to the species' survival. The population is stable.

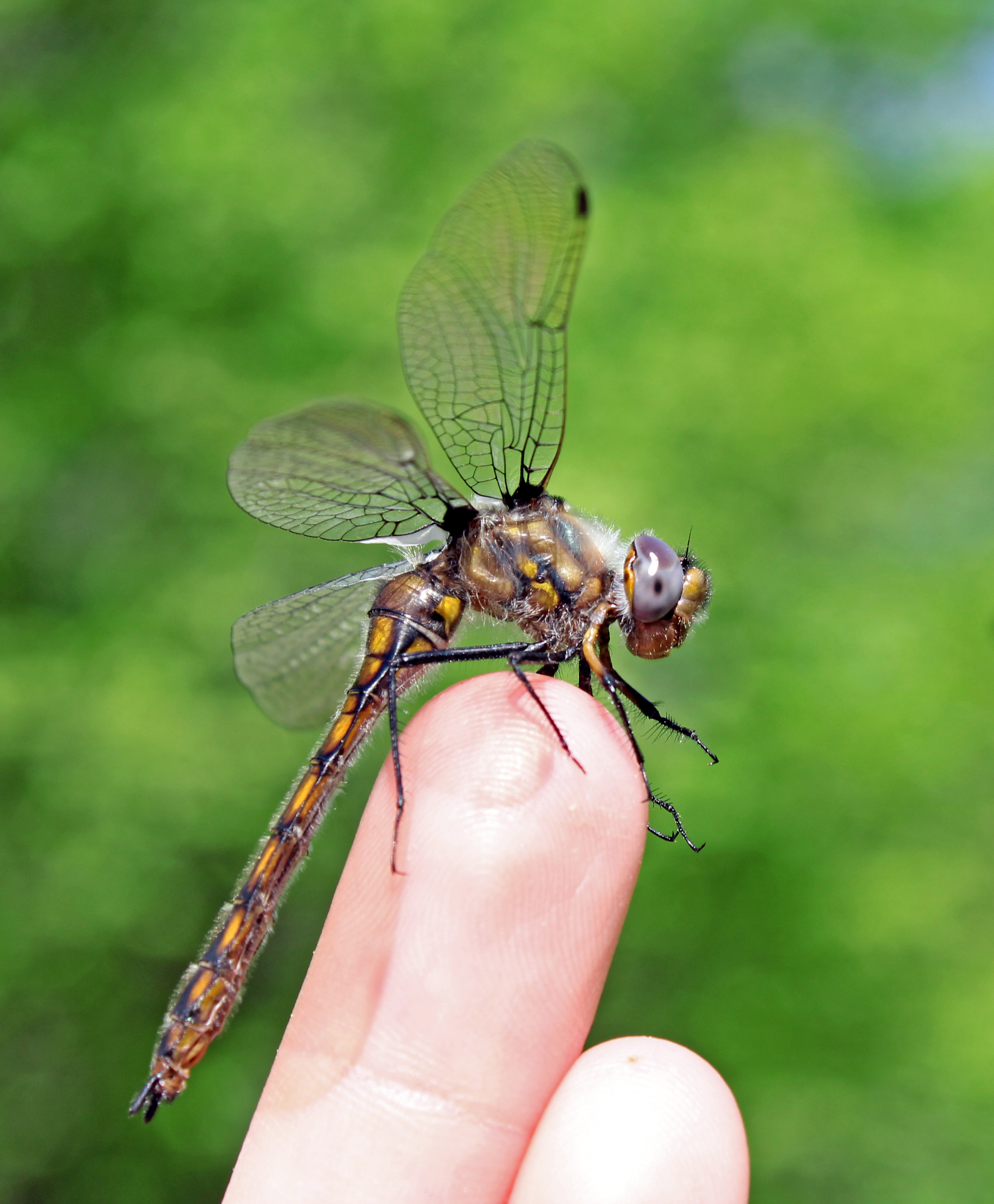
Beaverpond baskettail, Epitheca canis
