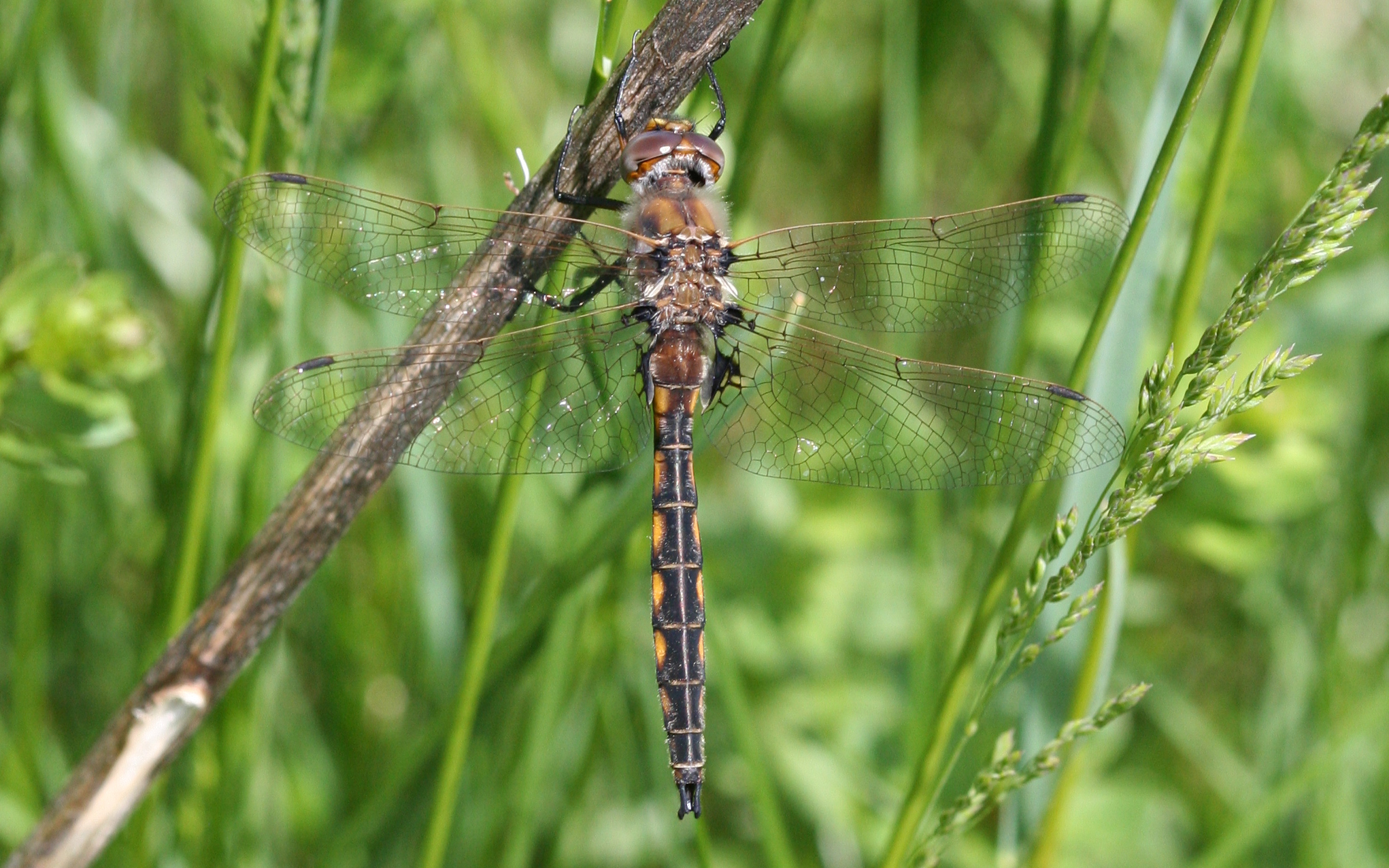
- Male

Conservation status
- Least Concern (IUCN 3.1)

Scientific classification
- Kingdom: Animalia
- Phylum: Arthropoda
- Class: Insecta
- Order: Odonata
- Infraorder: Anisoptera
- Family: Corduliidae
- Genus: Epitheca
- Species: E. cynosura

Binomial name
- Epitheca cynosura (Say, 1839)
- Range of E. cynosura

Synonyms
- Tetragoneuria cynosura Say, 1839

= Common baskettail =

Species of dragonfly

The common baskettail (Epitheca cynosura) is a species of dragonfly in the family Corduliidae.

== Etymology ==
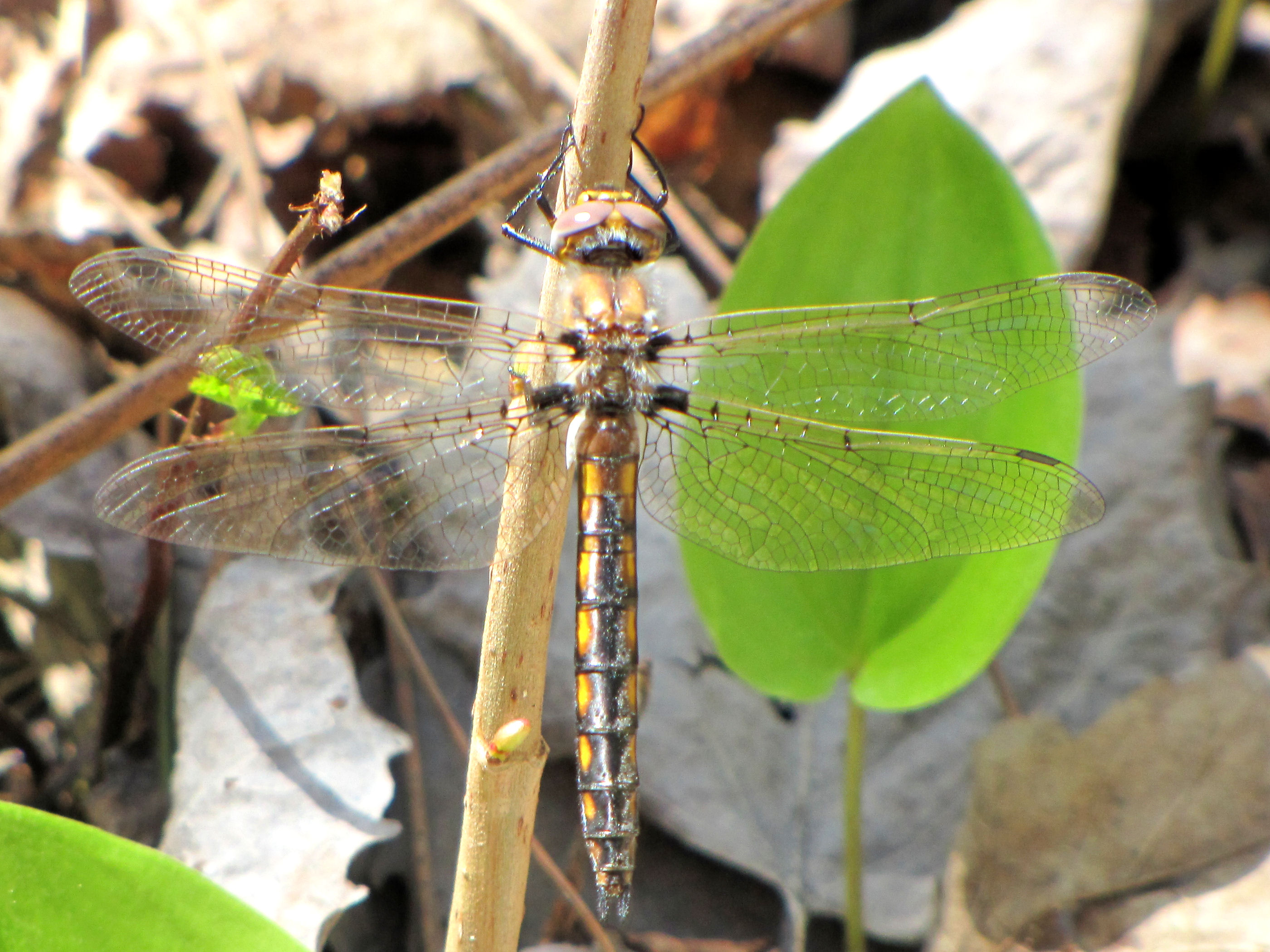
Female

This is the most common baskettail within its range, hence the name.

The scientific name, cynosura, means dog tail, and possibly refers to way the cerci at the end of the abdomen curve outward like a dog wagging its tail one way then the other.

== Description ==
The thorax is brown and hairy. Some specimens have a triangular spot at the base of the hindwing. Individuals are difficult to distinguish from the other species in this genus. The caudal appendages (structures at the tip of the abdomen) differ between the species and can be compared with known drawings or close-up photos. Their flight season can begin as early as January and extends to August. They may also be seen October to December in north Florida.
