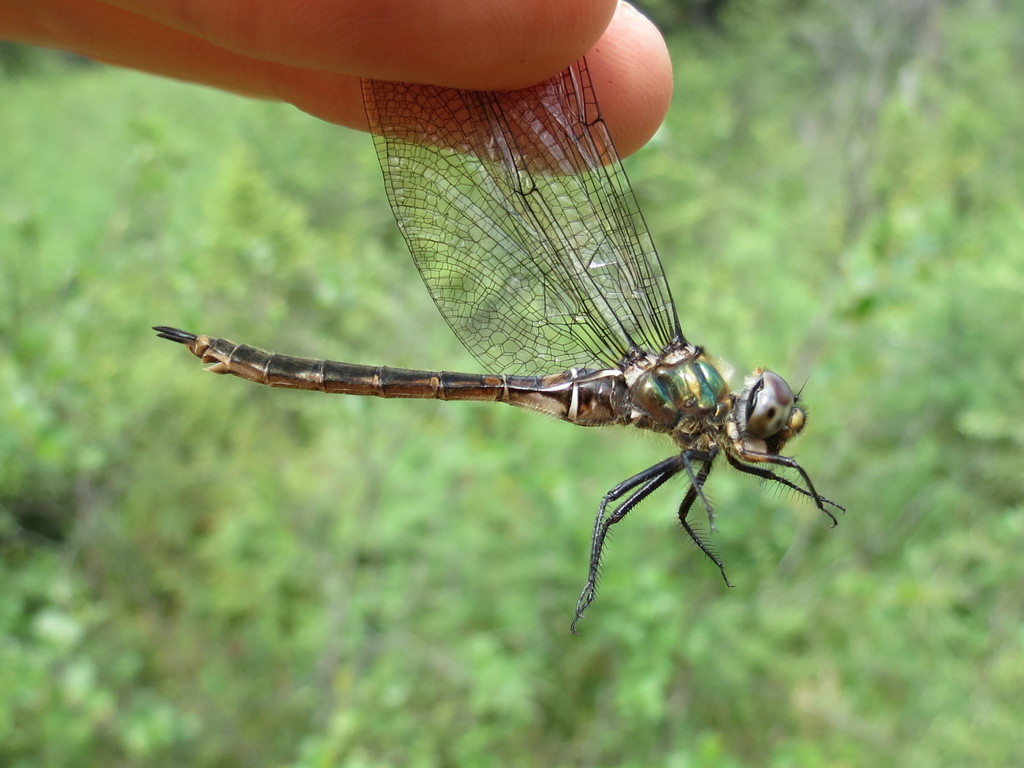

Conservation status
- Least Concern (IUCN 3.1)

- Apparently Secure (NatureServe)

Scientific classification
- Kingdom: Animalia
- Phylum: Arthropoda
- Clade: Pancrustacea
- Class: Insecta
- Order: Odonata
- Suborder: Anisoptera
- Superfamily: Libelluloidea
- Family: Corduliidae
- Genus: Somatochlora
- Species: S. brevicincta

Binomial name
- Somatochlora brevicincta Robert, 1954

= Somatochlora brevicincta =

Quebec Emerald

Species of dragonfly

The Quebec Emerald or Robert's Emerald (Somatochlora brevicincta) is a species of dragonfly in the family Corduliidae. It is one of the 42 species within the genus Somatochlora found in the Northern Hemisphere. It is one of the rarest Odonata species in Canada and among the most recently described. Adrien Robert, a Canadian entomologist, Cleric of Saint Viator, and professor at the University of Montreal, first described S. brevicincta in 1954.

== Physical description ==
Somatochlora brevicincta is a dark northern emerald dragonfly, with no prominent field marks other than its distinct rings which place it within the ringed group. These dragonflies are moderately sized and robust; their body length is typically around 5 cm (2.0 in) and a wingspan around 6 cm (2.4 in), with some variation between the sexes. Females are distinctly smaller in British Columbia compared to Eastern North America.

=== Colouration ===
The colouration of these Emeralds is quite notable, and they express sexual dimorphism. Both males and females exhibit a black face with yellow on the sides and a dorsal black abdomen. While the male's thorax is shiny green-black with vertically elongate faint yellow spot on the side of the mesothorax, the thorax of females is brown and green with reddish hairs on the hind margin of its head. Faint whitish rings are noticeable along the shiny black abdomen between terminal segments in both sexes.

=== Structures ===
The cerci of S. brevicinta have a tiny lateral tooth at the base, with the tips angled inward and then curved upward in a long, slender point. The eyes are metallic brown with bright green.

=== Larvae ===
Quebec Emerald larvae possess triangular heads and seven-segmented antennae. The epiproct – a singular lower appendage – is triangular in shape and slightly larger than the cerci. Together, these two structures form the claspers. The hind legs of the aquatic larvae are longer than both the mid and fore legs. Additionally, the larvae's head, thorax, and abdomen are covered in hair of varying length, with the longest hairs found on the sixth to ninth abdominal segments.

=== Intrageneric Differentiation ===
There are several characters that allow for intrageneric differentiation of the Quebec Emerald. Although adult males look like Somatochlora albicincta, S. brevicincta males have a curved rather than bent hamule. Adult female S. brevicincta have a subgenital plate that is equally as long as the ninth abdominal segment and is not notched as in adult female S. albicinta. Unlike the Delicate, Muskeg, and Whitehouse's Emeralds, there is no brown colouration at the wing base of the Quebec Emerald. Among the Hudsonian and Ringed Emeralds, the Quebec Emeralds have less distinct abdominal rings.

== Geographic range ==
The Quebec Emerald is a North American, trans-continental dragonfly found in Canada and the United States. The type specimen was found in the Lake Mistassini region of Quebec around 50.5°N, 74°W. Prior to 1995, it had only been observed in a few isolated peatlands in Quebec. A resident of British Columbia, Ontario, Quebec, New Brunswick, and Newfoundland, it is within a group of subarctic species that are rarely found below 45 degrees N. It has been observed as far northwest as Willison Lake, BC, and southeast as Piscataquis County, Maine. It must also exist at scattered sites across Canada between these two locales. There are a scarce number of breeding populations in the United States, but it was discovered relatively recently in Minnesota. The fact that observations have been few and far between could indicate inadequate surveying. An interactive map, pictures, and catalogue of specimens and where they were observed is available at the Global Biodiversity Information Facility website.

Being a rare but so broadly distributed across North America, and with little to no evidence of an intermediary between the western and eastern populations, S. brevicincta could potentially encompass more than one species, although no plausible arguments have been made in favour of this theory yet.

== Habitat ==
Odonata are for the most part warm-adapted, and as such their abundance and diversity decreases with increasing latitude and altitude. S. brevicincta prefers lentic bodies of water, such as fens and heaths, favouring these areas found within and bordering bogs rather than the secondary ponds of those bogs which are open and firm-edged. Their microhabitat is characterized by water-suspended or water-saturated sphagnum and graminaceous emergents, indicating a weakly minerotrophic environment. They breed in small water-filled hollows called flarks that are home to sedges, rushes, and mosses. The larvae of Corduliids live in shallower water with leaf litter, and thus are subject to habitat destruction by removal of detritus and riparian trees.

== Reproduction ==
Quebec Emeralds lay eggs epiphytically; the eggs are stuck to vegetation (e.g. moss) at or above the water surface. The females will oviposit unaccompanied by her partner, skimming the water's surface and rapidly tapping it with the tip of her abdomen.

== Food habits ==
Quebec Emeralds are predators as both nymphs and adults. The nymphs prey on other insect larvae, but also can feed on tadpoles and small fish. Adults are indiscriminate feeders of flying insects such as mosquitoes, midges, and smaller dragonflies.

== Conservation status ==
NatureServe classifies S. brevicincta as Vulnerable (S3) in British Columbia and Minnesota; Imperiled (S2) in Ontario, Maine, New Brunswick, and Newfoundland; Apparently Secured (S4) in Quebec; and Critically Imperiled (S1) in Nova Scotia. These rankings are based on existing information and expertise on a province/state-wide level, accounting for the number of occurrences, distribution, population size, abundance trends, and threats posed to the Quebec Emerald. To find out more about the definitions of the rankings, you can visit the NatureServe Explorer website. In the Species At Risk Assessment of 2005 conducted by the Canadian government, S. brevicincta underwent a status modification from "Sensitive" to "Undetermined" due to procedural changes.

As of February 27, 2022, the Maine Department of Inland Fisheries and Wildlife has designated S. brevicincta as a species of special concern. In Minnesota, the populations are entirely reliant on patterned peatlands, which is quite rare in the state. Renewed interest in peat mining has put the species in a precarious position, as alteration of the habitat's hydrology is extremely disruptive, and protection of such conditions needs to be maintained.

== Taxonomic structure ==
Somatochlora brevicincta is an accepted species among entomologists, with a nomenclature status of "potentially valid", and has met standards for record credibility rating.

According to Canadensys, the Ouellet-Robert Entomological Collection, the René Martin Insectarium, and the Laval University Entomology Collection all contain Quebec Emerald specimens.

== Genetic data ==
Very little information on the genetic data of the Quebec Emerald exists. The National Center for Biotechnology Information (NCBI) GenBank has documented two sequences of the cytochrome oxidase subunit 1 (COI) gene, but nothing on a complete genome is available. However, there are significant number of records on the genus. S. brevicincta is described in the Biodiversity of Life Database (BOLD Systems) with the assigned Barcode Index Number (BIN) of 250259. Although this website provides some public data on the specimen depositories, sequencing labs, and specimen collection sites, it is still a data deficient species.
