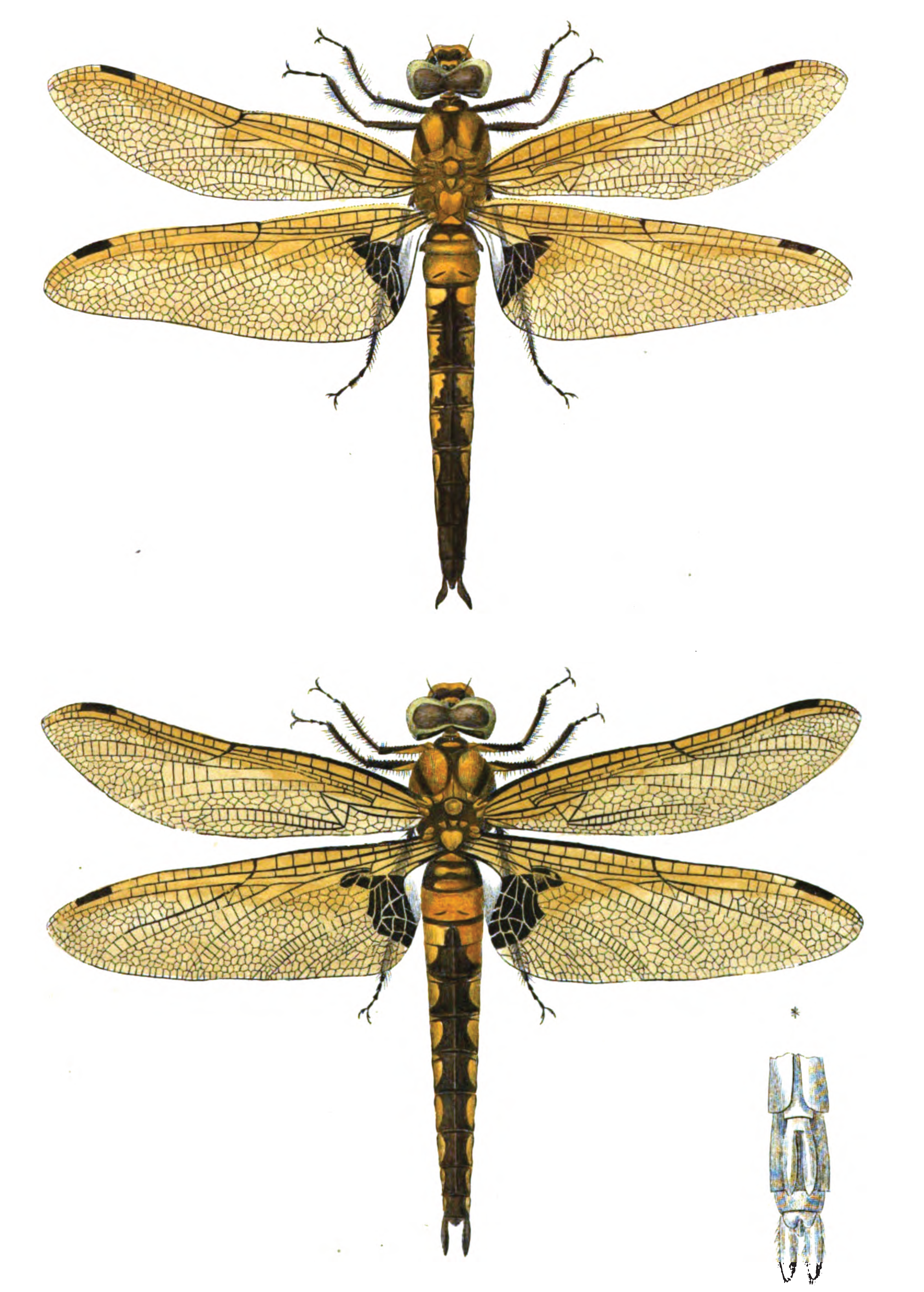
- Male and female
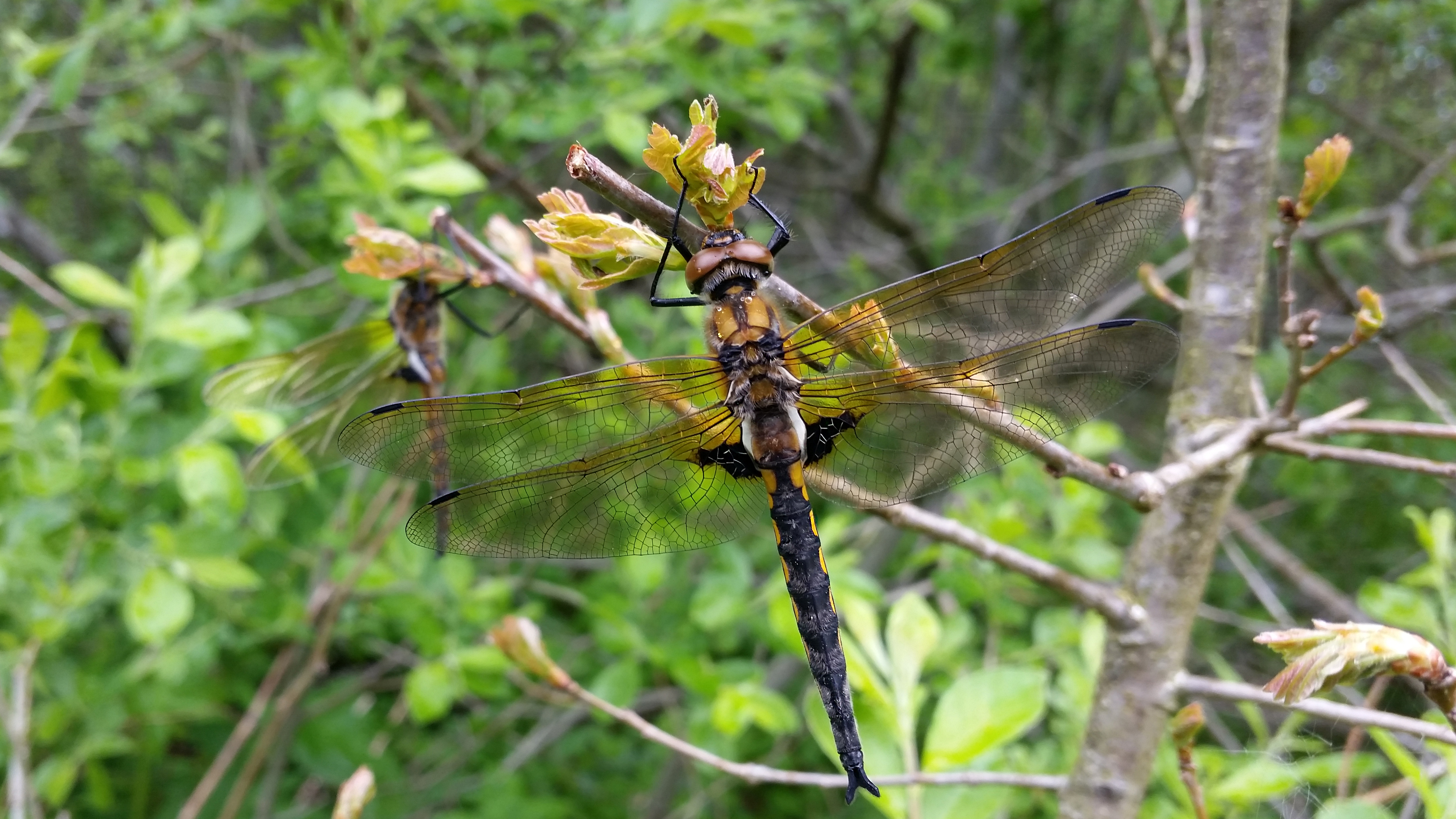
- Photographed in Lithuania

Conservation status
- Least Concern (IUCN 3.1)

Scientific classification
- Kingdom: Animalia
- Phylum: Arthropoda
- Class: Insecta
- Order: Odonata
- Infraorder: Anisoptera
- Family: Corduliidae
- Genus: Epitheca
- Species: E. bimaculata

Binomial name
- Epitheca bimaculata (Charpentier, 1825)

Synonyms
- Libellula bimaculata Charpentier, 1825

= Epitheca bimaculata =

Species of dragonfly

Epitheca bimaculata, the Eurasian baskettail or two-spotted dragonfly, is a species of dragonfly. It was described by Toussaint de Charpentier in 1825 and initially placed in the genus Libellula. It is the type species of the genus Epitheca.

== Distribution ==
Its habitat ranges from Western France to Japan and eastern Siberia.

It has been found in Western Europe, but here it is "rare and seen very irregularly". It has also been found in Serbia, and Kaliningrad Oblast, Russia. Its occurrence in Hungary is "sporadic". It also is found in Ukraine.

== Biology ==
It flies in May and June.

== Former subspecies ==
Two subspecies were recognized, but they were synonymized in 2004:

- Epitheca bimaculata sibirica (Selys, 1887)
- Epitheca bimaculata altaica Belyshev, 1951
