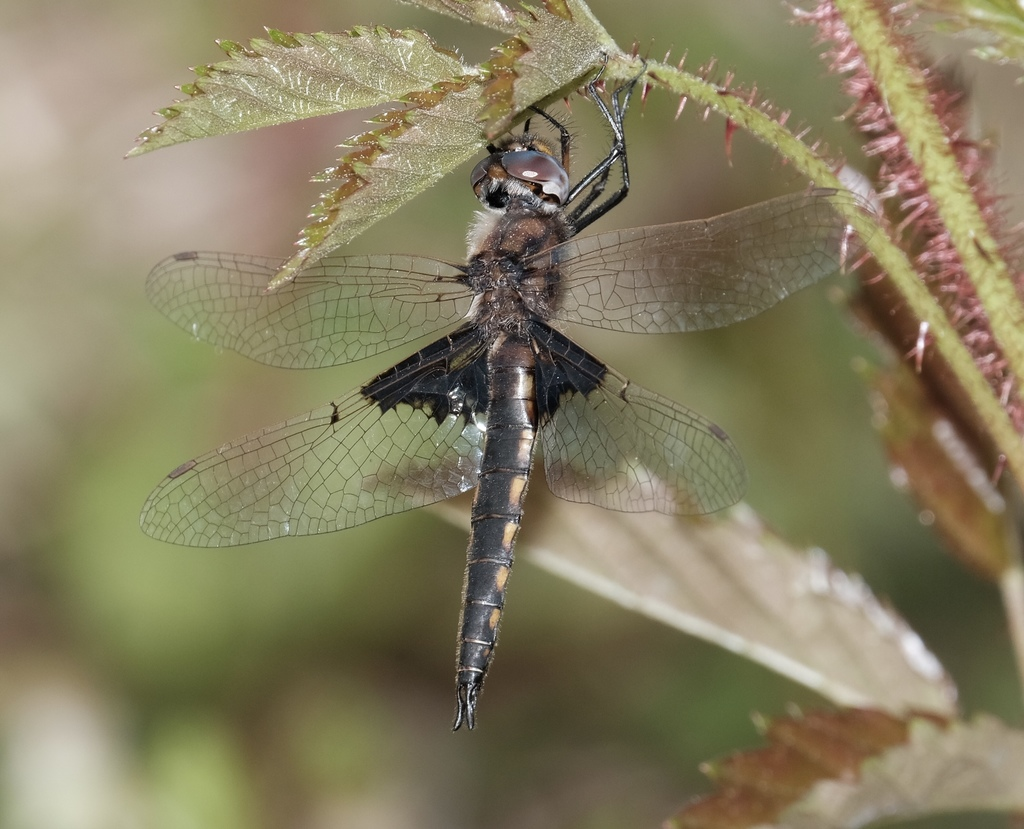

Conservation status
- Least Concern (IUCN 3.1)

Scientific classification
- Kingdom: Animalia
- Phylum: Arthropoda
- Class: Insecta
- Order: Odonata
- Infraorder: Anisoptera
- Family: Corduliidae
- Genus: Epitheca
- Species: E. semiaquea

Binomial name
- Epitheca semiaquea (Burmeister, 1839)

= Epitheca semiaquea =

Species of dragonfly

Epitheca semiaquea, the mantled baskettail, is a species of emerald dragonfly in the family Corduliidae. It is found in North America.

The IUCN conservation status of Epitheca semiaquea is "LC", least concern, with no immediate threat to the species' survival. The population is stable. The IUCN status was reviewed in 2017.
