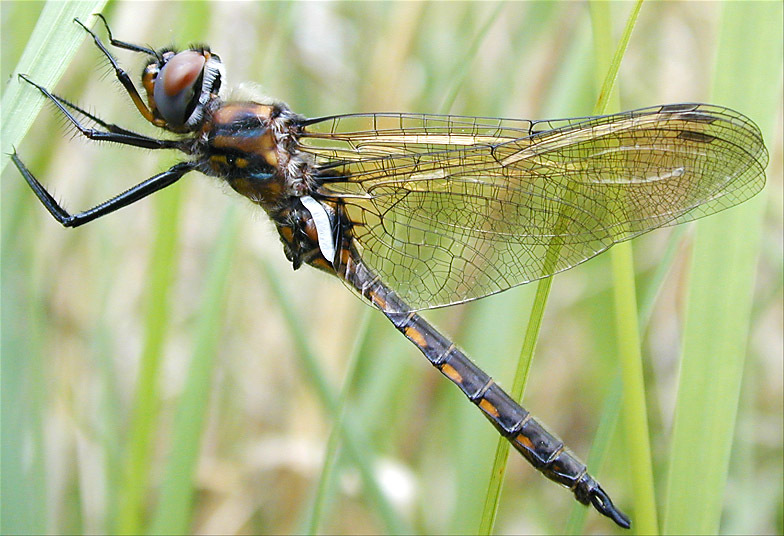
- Spiny baskettail, teneral male

Conservation status
- Least Concern (IUCN 3.1)

Scientific classification
- Kingdom: Animalia
- Phylum: Arthropoda
- Class: Insecta
- Order: Odonata
- Infraorder: Anisoptera
- Family: Corduliidae
- Genus: Epitheca
- Species: E. spinigera

Binomial name
- Epitheca spinigera (Selys, 1871)

Synonyms
- Tetragoneuria spinigera

= Spiny baskettail =

Species of dragonfly

The spiny baskettail (Epitheca spinigera) is a dragonfly of the Corduliidae family. Flight season is late May to early July.

== Etymology ==
The scientific name, spinigera, means spine-bearing. The males have a sharp looking spine that points downward from the cerci (at the end of the abdomen). The spine may be absent on rare occasions.
