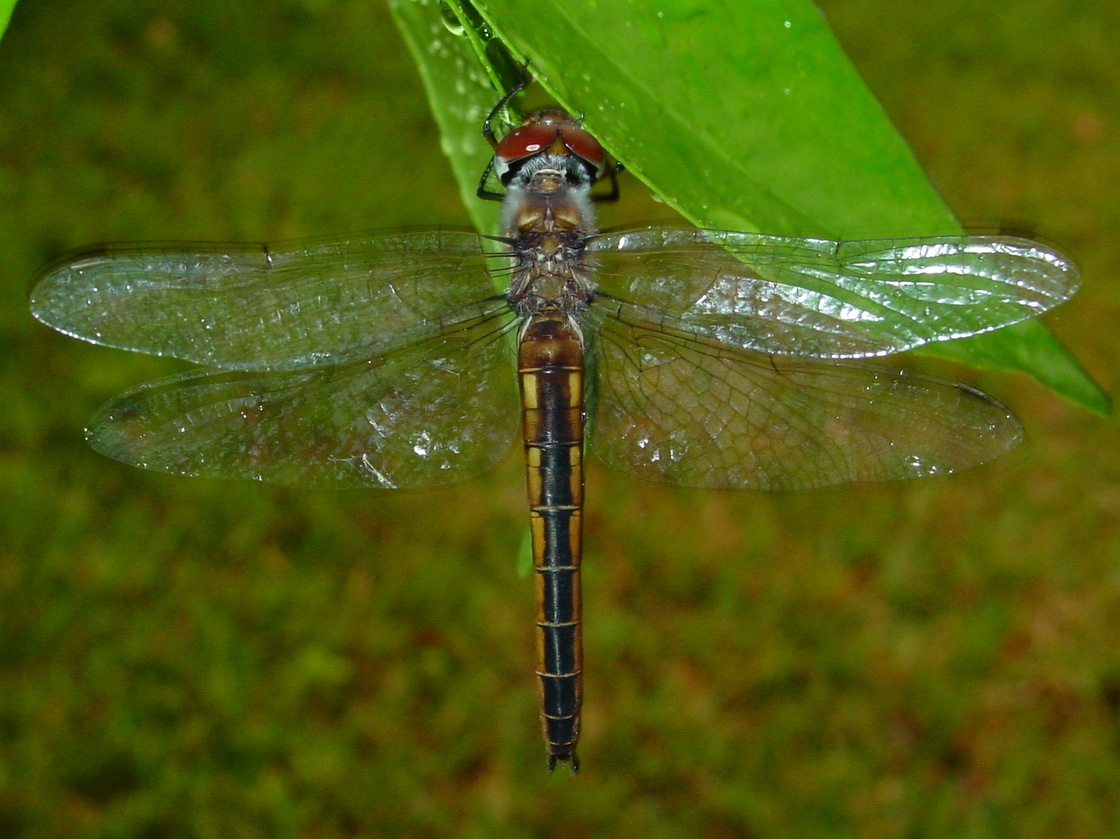

Conservation status
- Least Concern (IUCN 3.1)

Scientific classification
- Kingdom: Animalia
- Phylum: Arthropoda
- Class: Insecta
- Order: Odonata
- Infraorder: Anisoptera
- Family: Corduliidae
- Genus: Epitheca
- Species: E. sepia

Binomial name
- Epitheca sepia (Gloyd, 1933)

= Epitheca sepia =

Species of dragonfly

Epitheca sepia, the sepia baskettail, is a species of emerald dragonfly in the family Corduliidae. It is found in North America.

The IUCN conservation status of Epitheca sepia is "LC", least concern, with no immediate threat to the species' survival. The population is stable.

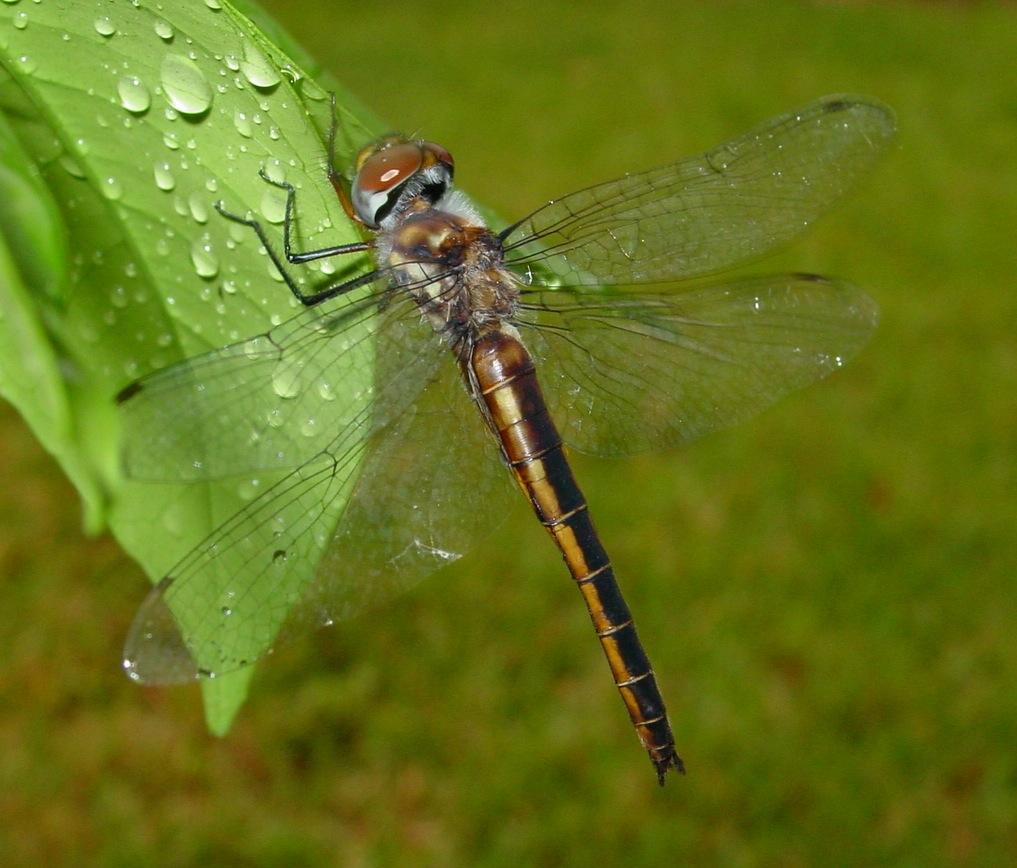
Sepia baskettail, Epitheca sepia
