= Epitheca spinosa =

Conservation status
- Least Concern (IUCN 3.1)

Scientific classification
- Kingdom: Animalia
- Phylum: Arthropoda
- Class: Insecta
- Order: Odonata
- Infraorder: Anisoptera
- Family: Corduliidae
- Genus: Epitheca
- Species: E. spinosa

Binomial name
- Epitheca spinosa (Hagen in Selys, 1878)

Species of dragonfly

Epitheca spinosa, the robust baskettail, is a species of emerald dragonfly in the family Corduliidae. It is found in North America.

The IUCN conservation status of Epitheca spinosa is "LC", least concern, with no immediate threat to the species' survival. The population is stable.
