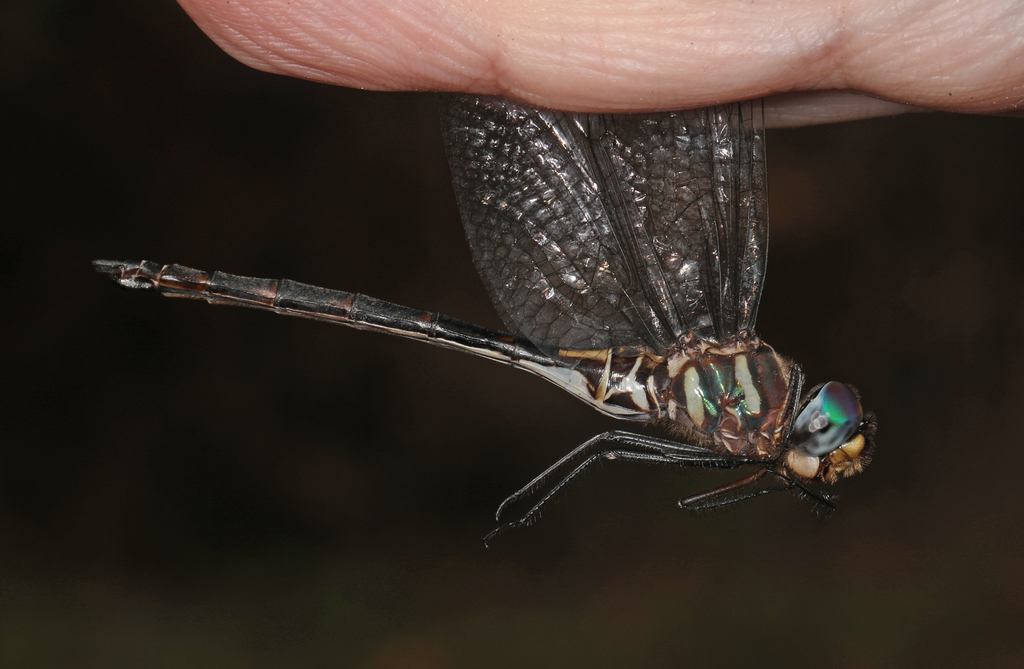

Conservation status
- Data Deficient (IUCN 3.1)

Scientific classification
- Kingdom: Animalia
- Phylum: Arthropoda
- Clade: Pancrustacea
- Class: Insecta
- Order: Odonata
- Infraorder: Anisoptera
- Superfamily: Libelluloidea
- Family: Corduliidae
- Genus: Somatochlora
- Species: S. margarita

Binomial name
- Somatochlora margarita Donnelly, 1962

= Somatochlora margarita =

Species of dragonfly

Somatochlora margarita, the Texas emerald, is a species of dragonfly in the family Corduliidae. It is endemic to the United States. Its natural habitat is rivers.

== Description ==
The dimensions of the Texas emerald are 50–54 mm (2.0–2.1 in) in length, 32–41 mm (1.3–1.6 in) abdomen length, and 32–37 mm (1.3–1.5 in) in hindwing length.

== Range ==
Somatochlora margarita is native to the two U.S. states of Texas and Louisiana. It is known to inhabit just 12 combined eastern Texas counties and western and central Louisiana parishes. The current known range is northwest of Houston and extends east into central Louisiana, reaching as far as Alexandria, Louisiana. The Texas emerald is rarely seen by humans because of its tendency of flying up and perching in and or on the canopy in trees or forests.
