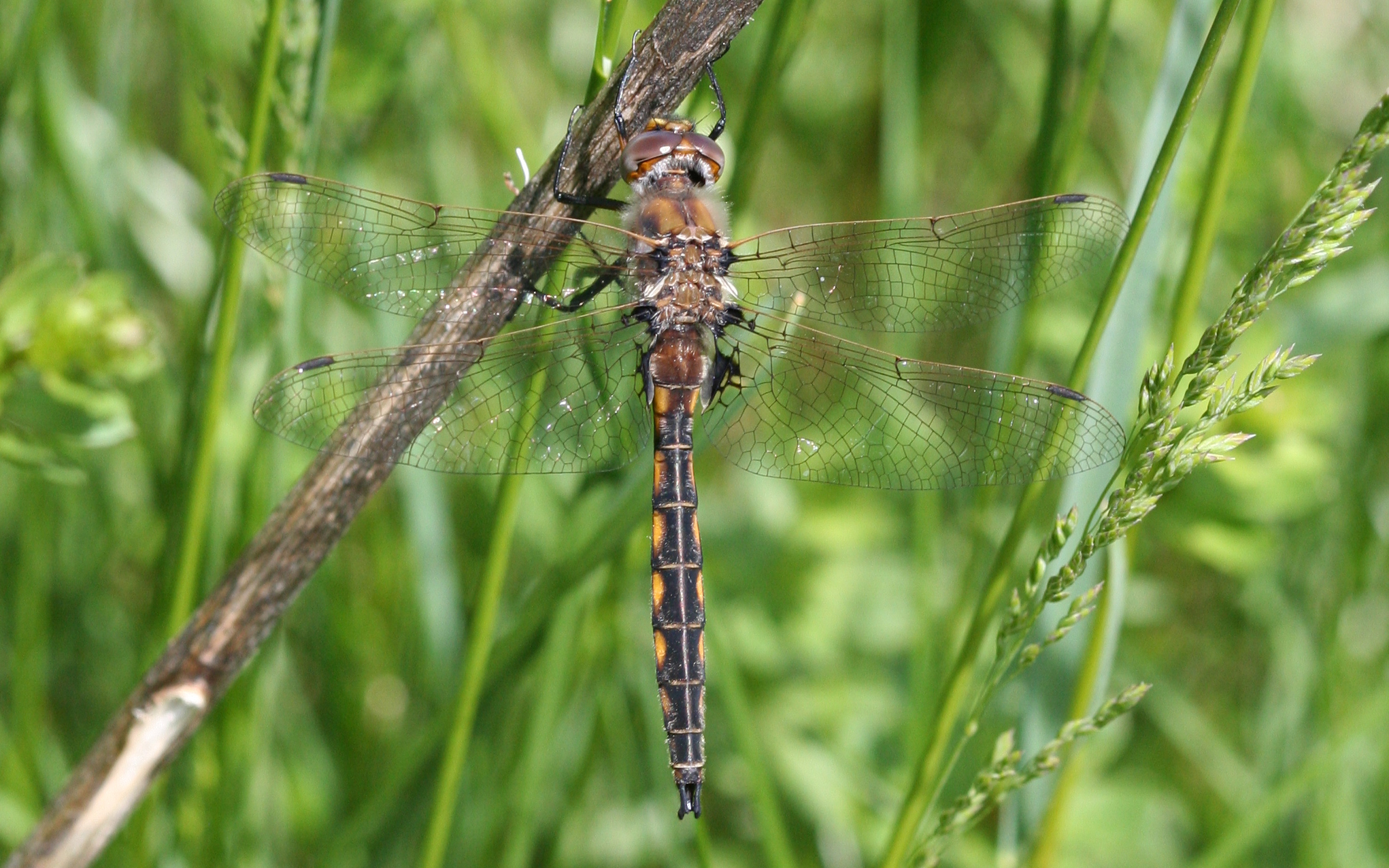
- Common baskettail

Scientific classification
- Kingdom: Animalia
- Phylum: Arthropoda
- Clade: Pancrustacea
- Class: Insecta
- Order: Odonata
- Infraorder: Anisoptera
- Family: Corduliidae
- Subfamily: Corduliinae
- Genus: Epitheca; Burmeister, 1839

Type species
- Libellula bimaculata Charpentier, 1825

= Epitheca =

Genus of dragonflies

Epitheca is a genus of dragonflies in the family Corduliidae. They are commonly known as baskettails. Baskettails' distinction is the specially adapted, upturned abdomen tip of the females which allows them to carry their egg masses in a small, orange-tinted globule.

Some authorities spin off the North American baskettails into two new genera, Epicordulia and Tetragoneuria, but this has not gained widespread acceptance and most references place them under this genus.

== Species ==
The genus contains the following species:

Image	Scientific name	Common name	Distribution
	Epitheca bimaculata (Charpentier, 1825)	Eurasian baskettail	Serbia and Kaliningrad Oblast, Russia, Ukraine
	Epitheca canis (McLachlan, 1886)	beaverpond baskettail	Canada and northern United States.
	Epitheca costalis (Selys, 1871)	slender baskettail or stripe-winged baskettail	eastern and southern United States
	Epitheca cynosura (Say, 1840)	common baskettail	eastern and southern United States
	Epitheca marginata (Selys, 1883)		China, Korea, Japan
	Epitheca petechialis (Muttkowski, 1911)	dot-winged baskettail	South central United States
	Epitheca princeps Hagen, 1861	prince baskettail	midwestern and eastern United States.
	Epitheca semiaquea (Burmeister, 1839)	mantled baskettail	eastern United States.
	Epitheca sepia (Gloyd, 1933)	sepia baskettail	North America
	Epitheca spinigera (Selys, 1871)	spiny baskettail	northern United States and southern Canada
	Epitheca spinosa (Hagen in Selys, 1878)	robust baskettail	eastern United States.
	Epitheca stella (Williamson in Muttkowski, 1911)	Florida baskettail	Florida
