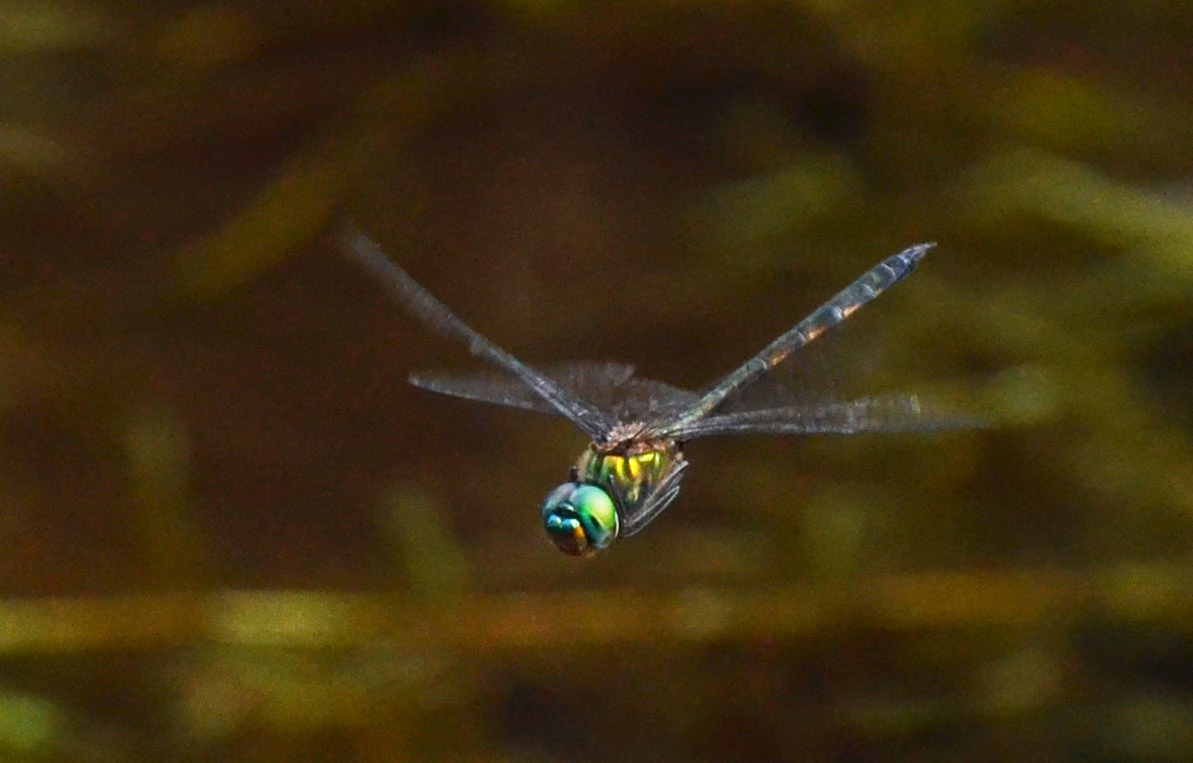
- in Periyar National Park

Conservation status
- Least Concern (IUCN 3.1)

Scientific classification
- Kingdom: Animalia
- Phylum: Arthropoda
- Class: Insecta
- Order: Odonata
- Infraorder: Anisoptera
- Family: Corduliidae
- Genus: Hemicordulia
- Species: H. asiatica

Binomial name
- Hemicordulia asiatica Selys, 1878

= Hemicordulia asiatica =

Asian emerald

Species of insect

Hemicordulia asiatica, Asian emerald, is a species of dragonfly in the family Corduliidae. H. asiatica belongs to an Australian genus and is the only representative found in Asia. It is found in Western Ghats, northeast India and Myanmar.

== Description and habitat ==
It is a dragonfly of medium size, coloured metallic green, sparingly marked with yellow. Its labium and labrum are bright yellow. Its lower part of frons and its sides are brighter yellow, changing to bright orange above and then brilliant metallic emerald-green. Its eyes are emerald-green when aged. Its pro-thorax is dark brown with a mid-dorsal yellow spot and thorax is dark metallic green, marked with yellow on the sides only. Its wings are hyaline with pterostigma dark brown. Its abdomen is glossy black with a metallic dark green reflex on dorsum, especially of the proximal segments, and marked laterally in bright ochreous color. Its anal appendages are black.

Female is closely similar to the male. The larvae breed in montane lakes or in deep still pools of mountain streams.

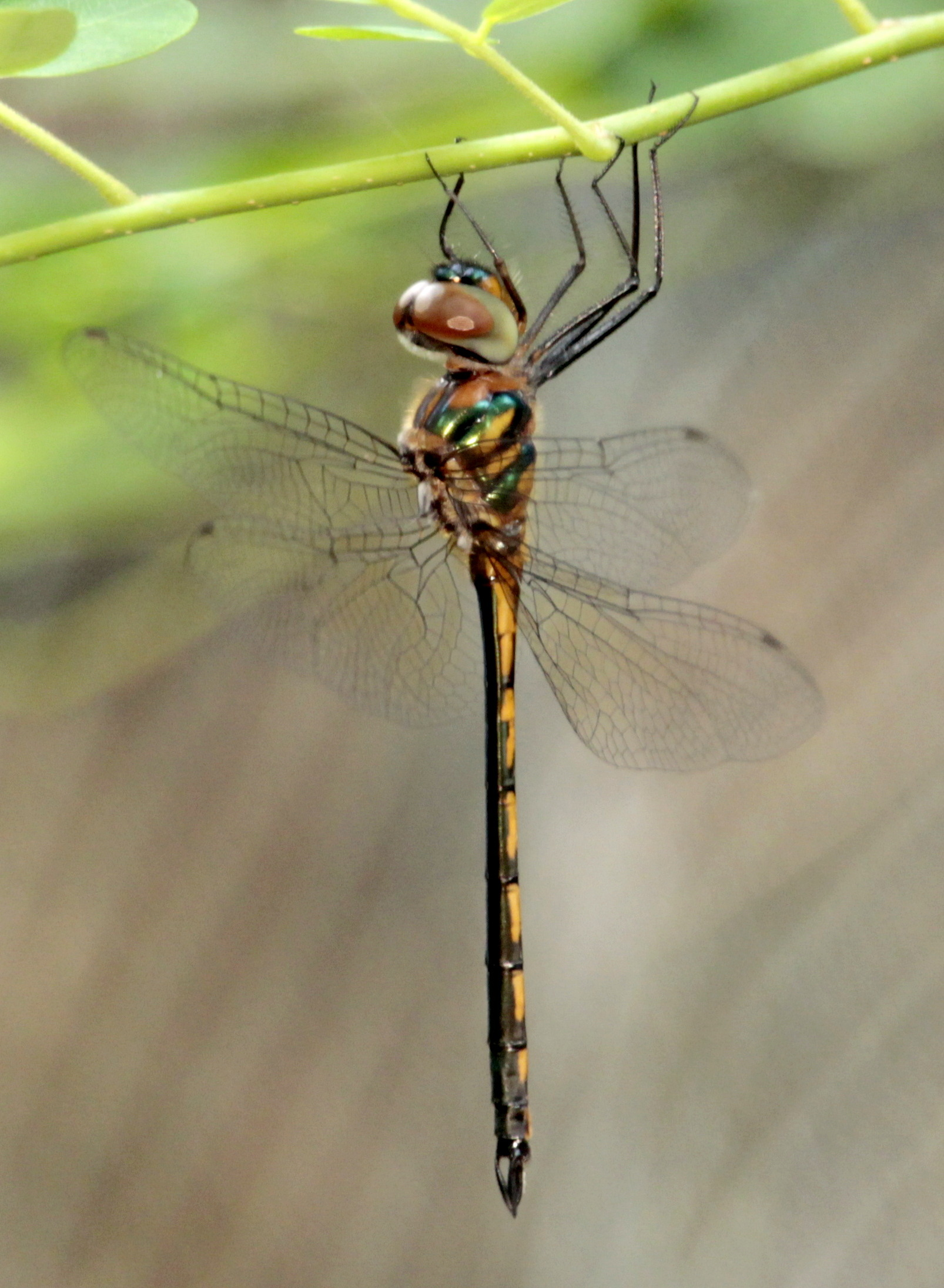
Male

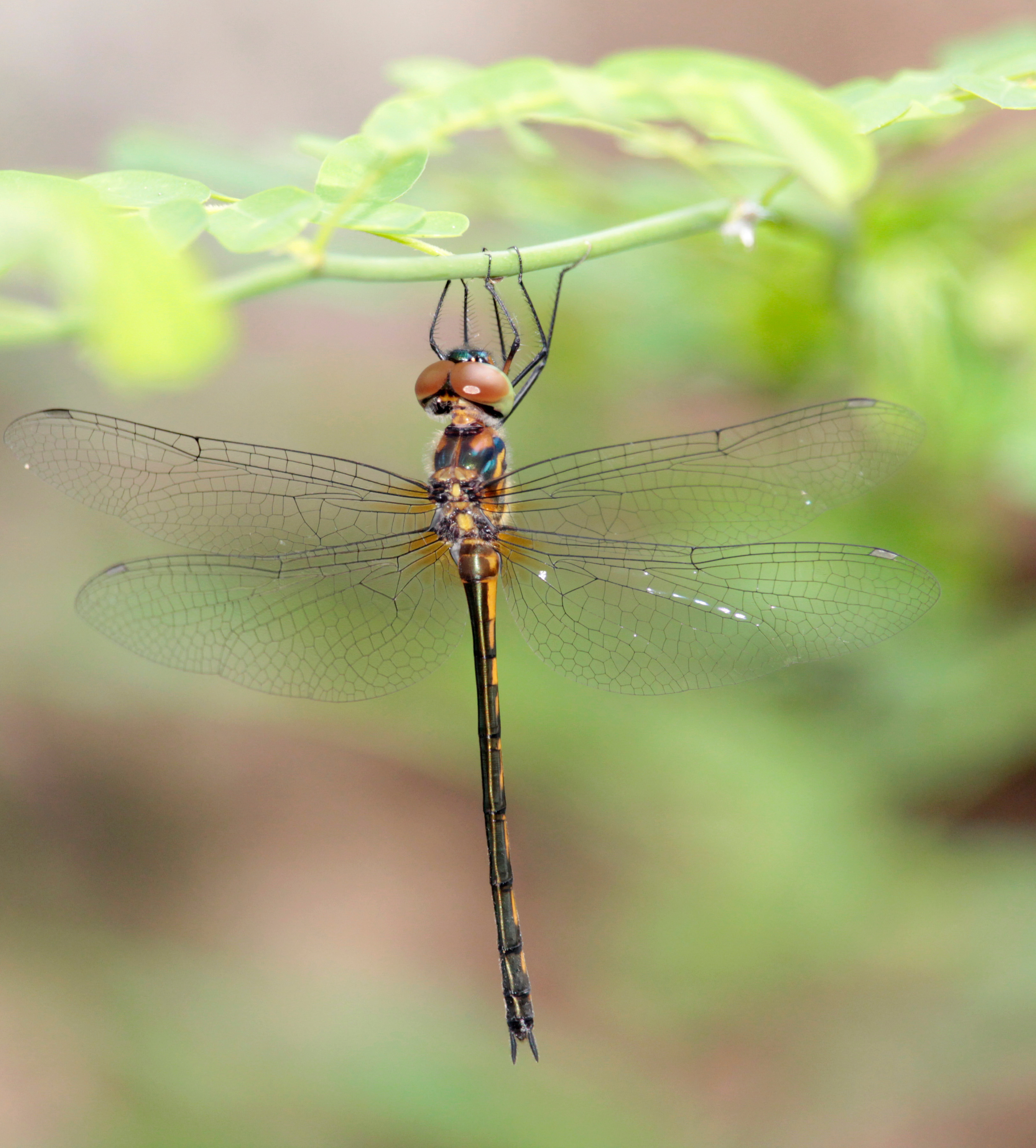
Female

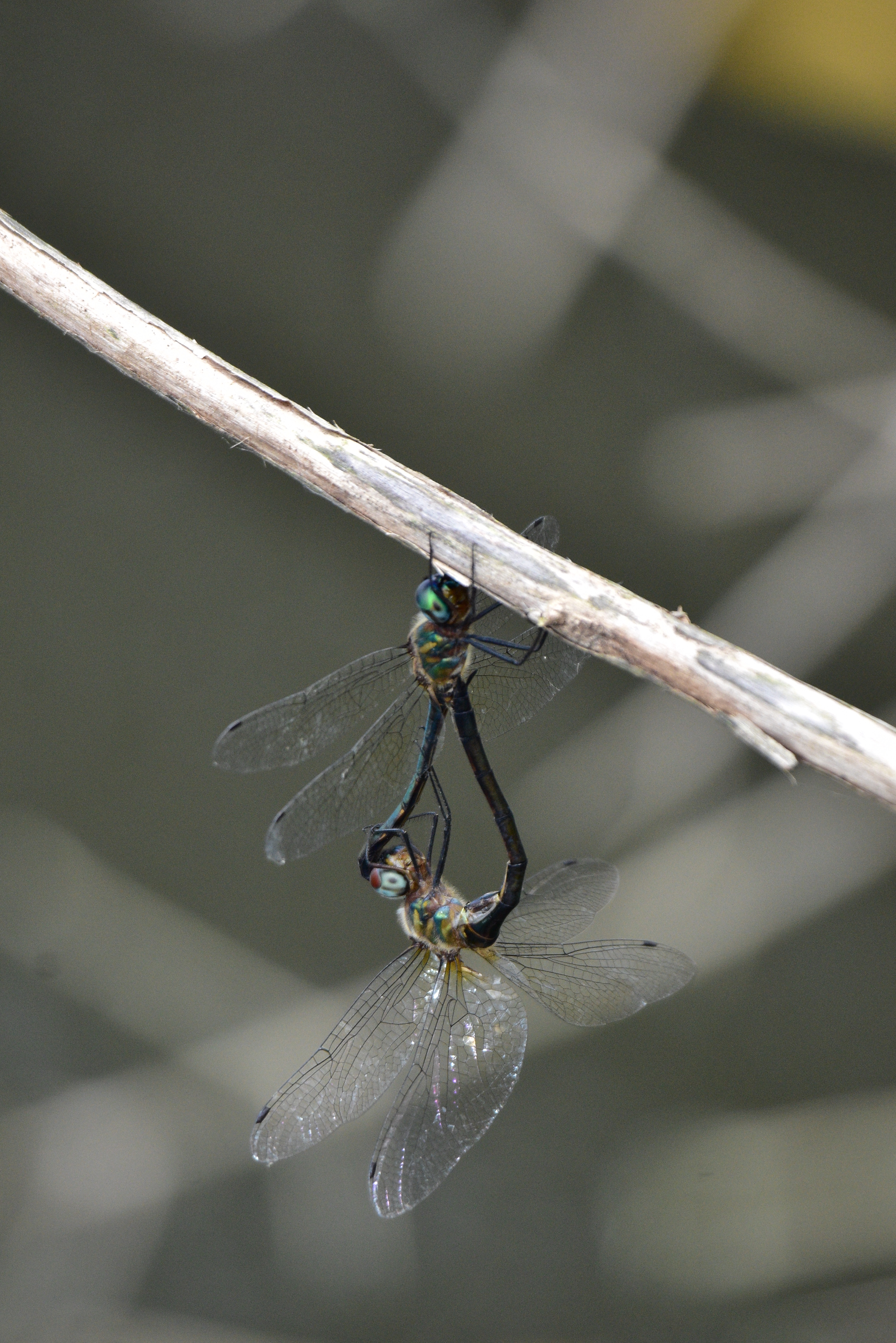
Mating pair

A survey jointly conducted by the Periyar Tiger Conservation Foundation, Indian Dragonfly Society and the Forest and Wildlife Department in Periyar National Park in October 2017 found Hemicordulia asiatica. This was a rediscovery after 80 years of Fraser's initial sighting of this species from the Western Ghats.

== See also ==
- List of odonates of India
- List of odonata of Kerala
