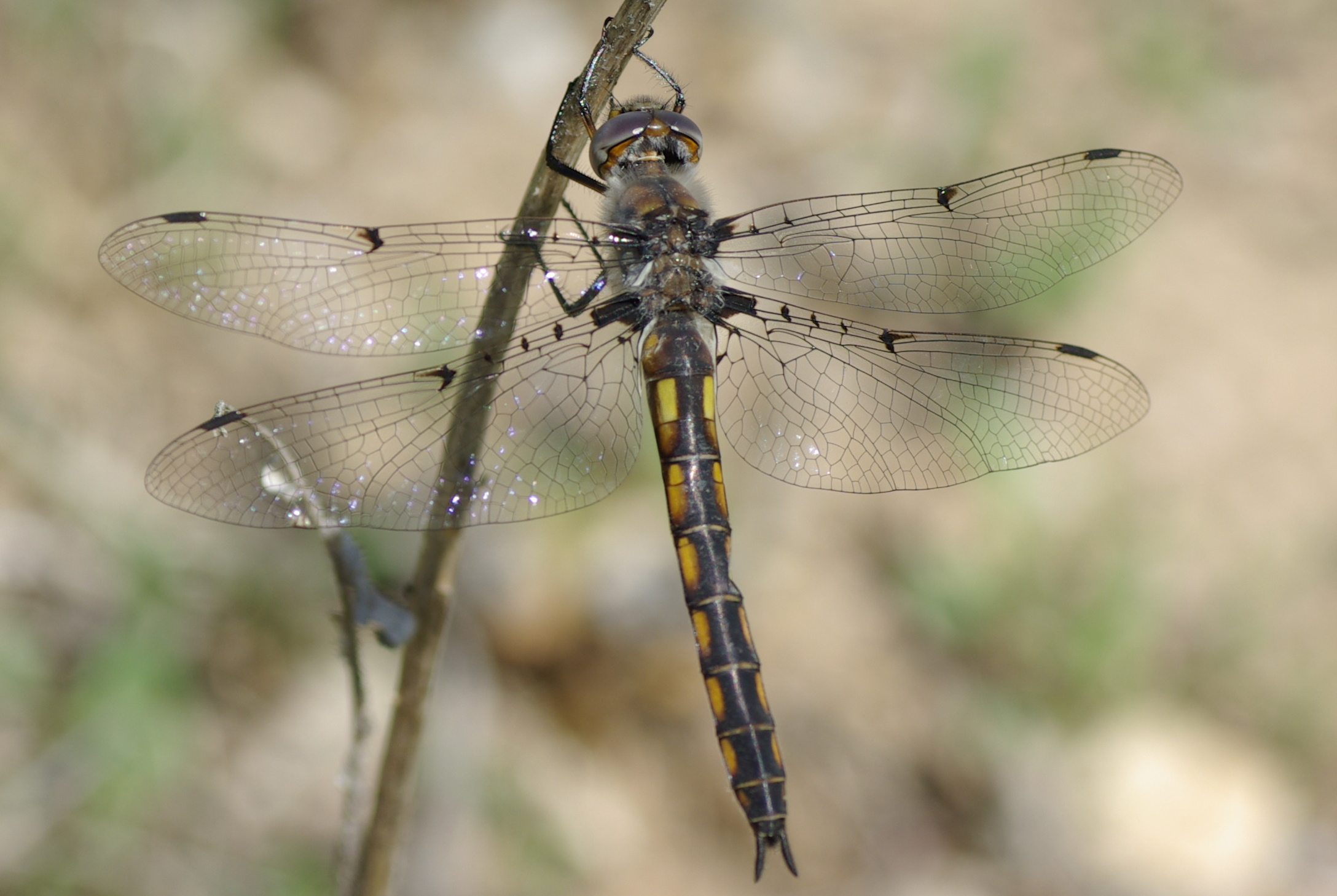

Conservation status
- Least Concern (IUCN 3.1)

Scientific classification
- Kingdom: Animalia
- Phylum: Arthropoda
- Class: Insecta
- Order: Odonata
- Infraorder: Anisoptera
- Family: Corduliidae
- Genus: Epitheca
- Species: E. petechialis

Binomial name
- Epitheca petechialis (Muttkowski, 1911)
- Range of E. petechialis

= Dot-winged baskettail =

Species of dragonfly

The dot-winged baskettail (Epitheca petechialis) is a dragonfly of the family Corduliidae. Their flight season extends from January to July, slightly later than the other baskettails. The easiest specimens to identify are those with the characteristic spots on the hindwing that give the species its name. Individuals without these spots are difficult to distinguish from the other species in this genus. The caudal appendages (structures at the tip of the abdomen) differ between the species and can be compared with known drawings or close-up photos.

== Etymology ==
The scientific name, petechialis, means spots. Thus, the scientific and common names both refer to the spots that appear on many, but not all, of the individuals.
