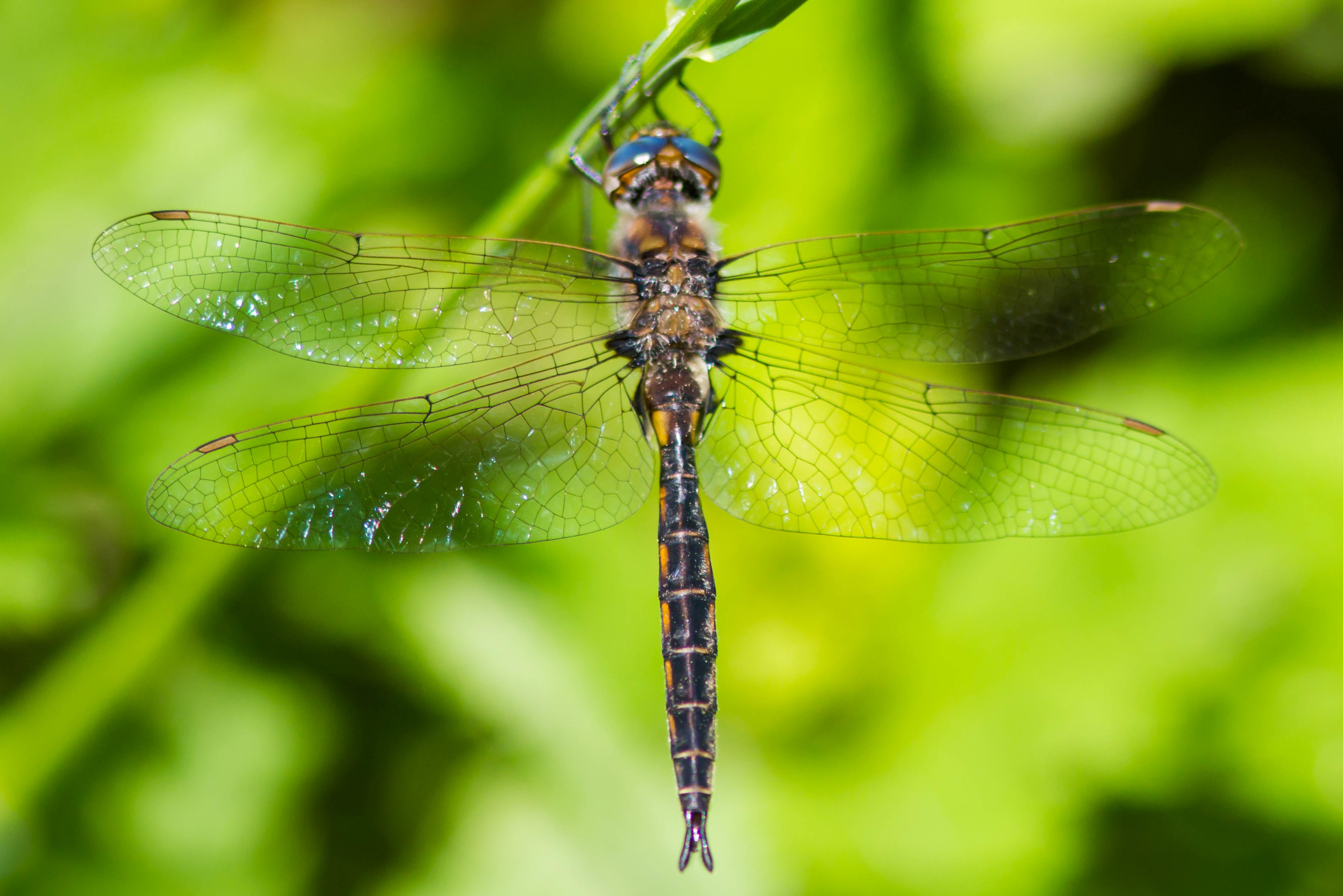

Conservation status
- Least Concern (IUCN 3.1)

Scientific classification
- Kingdom: Animalia
- Phylum: Arthropoda
- Class: Insecta
- Order: Odonata
- Infraorder: Anisoptera
- Family: Corduliidae
- Genus: Epitheca
- Species: E. costalis

Binomial name
- Epitheca costalis (Selys, 1871)

Synonyms
- Tetragoneuria williamsoni (Muttkowski, 1911)

= Epitheca costalis =

Species of dragonfly

Epitheca costalis, known generally as the slender baskettail or stripe-winged baskettail, is a species of emerald dragonfly in the family Corduliidae. It is found in North America.

The IUCN conservation status of Epitheca costalis is "LC", least concern, with no immediate threat to the species' survival. The population is stable. The IUCN status was reviewed in 2017.
