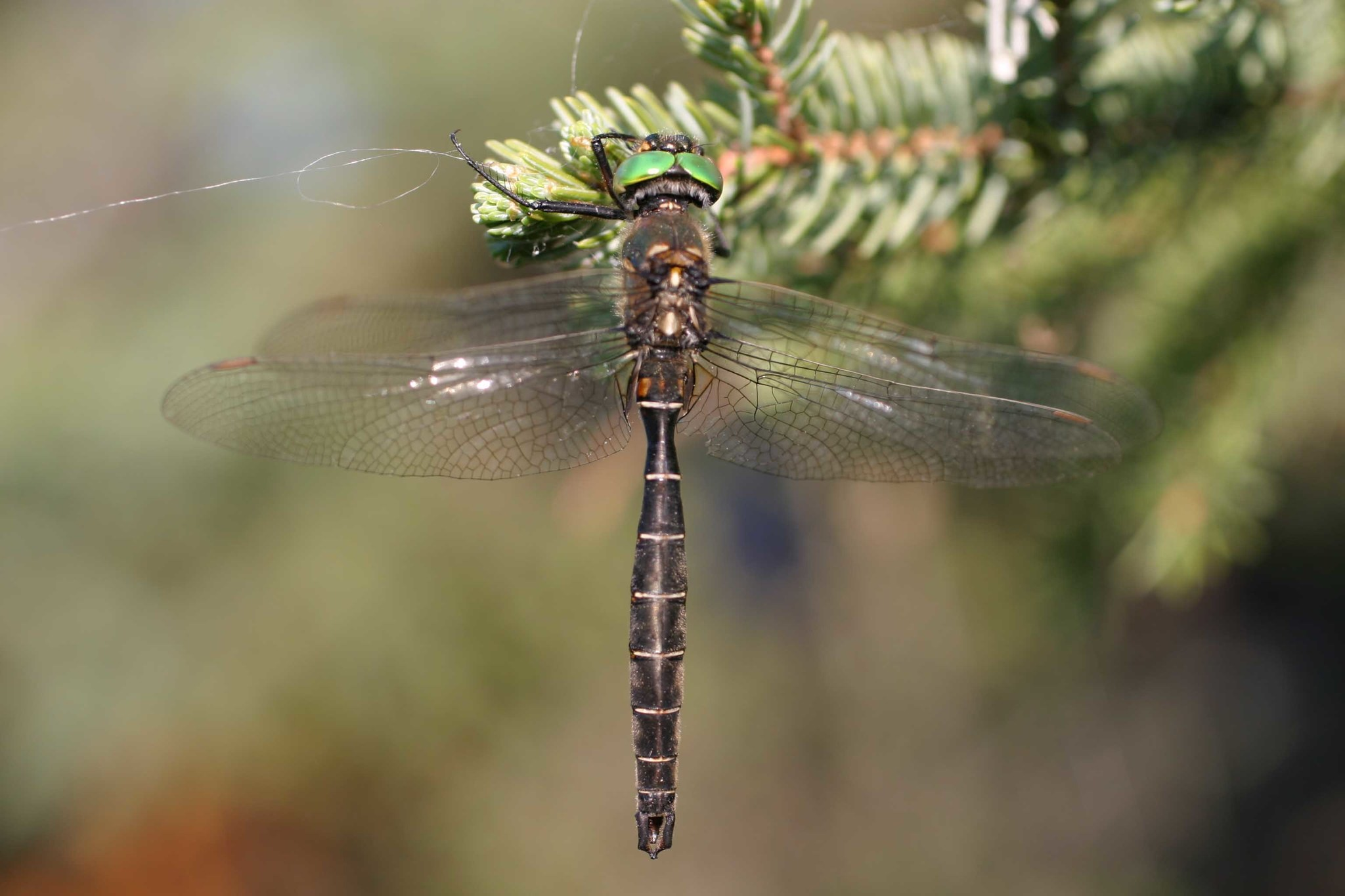

Conservation status
- Least Concern (IUCN 3.1)

Scientific classification
- Kingdom: Animalia
- Phylum: Arthropoda
- Clade: Pancrustacea
- Class: Insecta
- Order: Odonata
- Infraorder: Anisoptera
- Superfamily: Libelluloidea
- Family: Corduliidae
- Genus: Somatochlora
- Species: S. hudsonica

Binomial name
- Somatochlora hudsonica (Hagen in Selys, 1871)

Synonyms
- Epitheca hudsonica Hagen in Selys, 1871

= Somatochlora hudsonica =

Species of dragonfly

Somatochlora hudsonica, the Hudsonian emerald, is a species of emerald dragonfly in the family Corduliidae. It is found in North America.

The IUCN conservation status of Somatochlora hudsonica is "LC", least concern, with no immediate threat to the species' survival. The population is stable.
