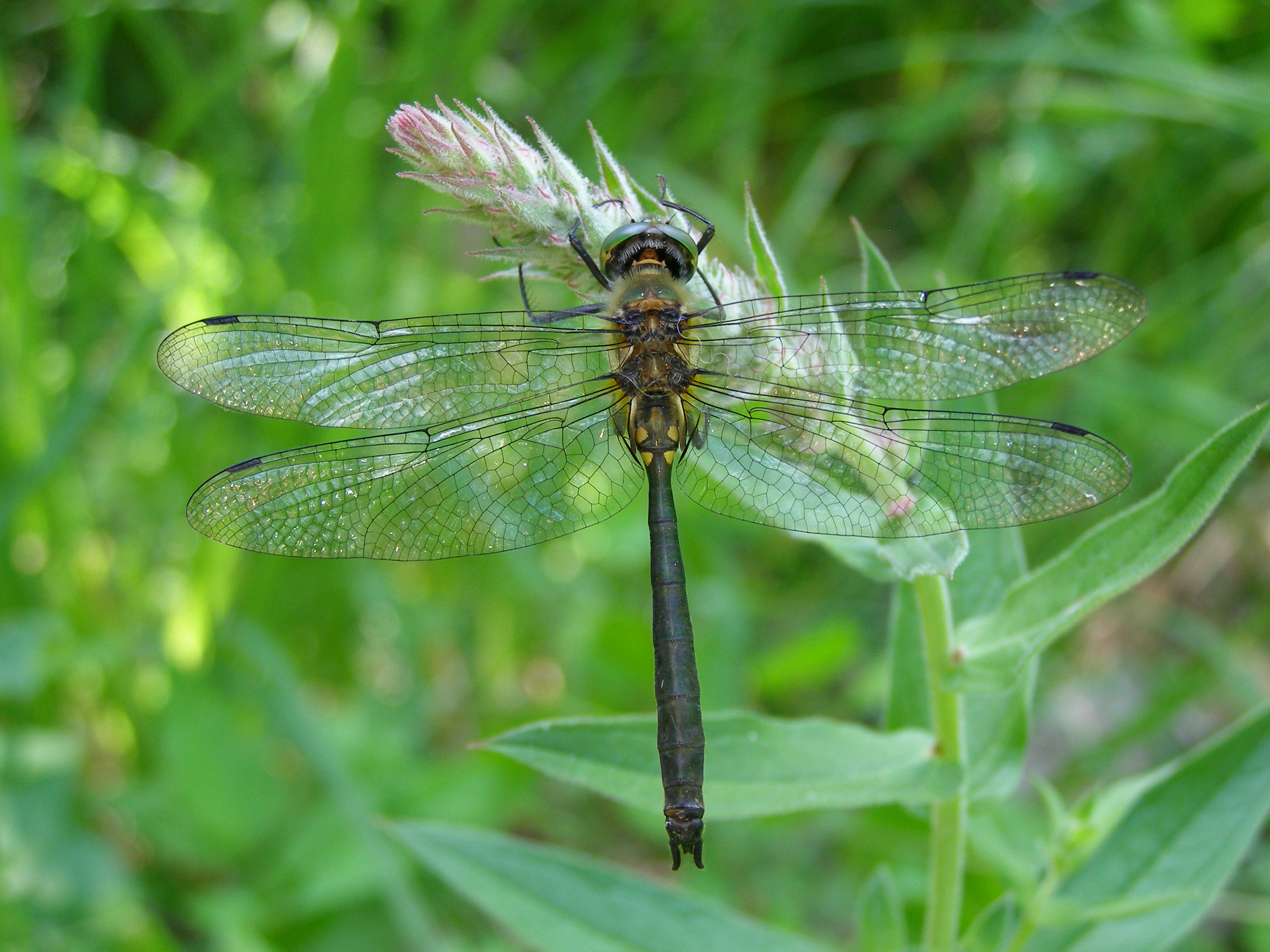

Conservation status
- Vulnerable (IUCN 3.1)

Scientific classification
- Kingdom: Animalia
- Phylum: Arthropoda
- Clade: Pancrustacea
- Class: Insecta
- Order: Odonata
- Infraorder: Anisoptera
- Superfamily: Libelluloidea
- Family: Corduliidae
- Genus: Corduliochlora; Marinov & Seidenbusch, 2007
- Species: C. borisi

Binomial name
- Corduliochlora borisi (Marinov, 2001)

Synonyms
- Somatochlora borisi

= Corduliochlora =

Species of dragonfly

Corduliochlora borisi, the Bulgarian emerald, is a species of dragonfly in the family Corduliidae, and the only species in the genus Corduliochlora. It is found in Bulgaria, Greece, and Turkey. Its natural habitat is rivers. It is threatened by habitat loss. The species is named after Boris Marinov. It was formerly treated as a member of the genus Somatochlora.
