= Filip Trybom =

Swedish zoologist and entomologist (1850–1913)

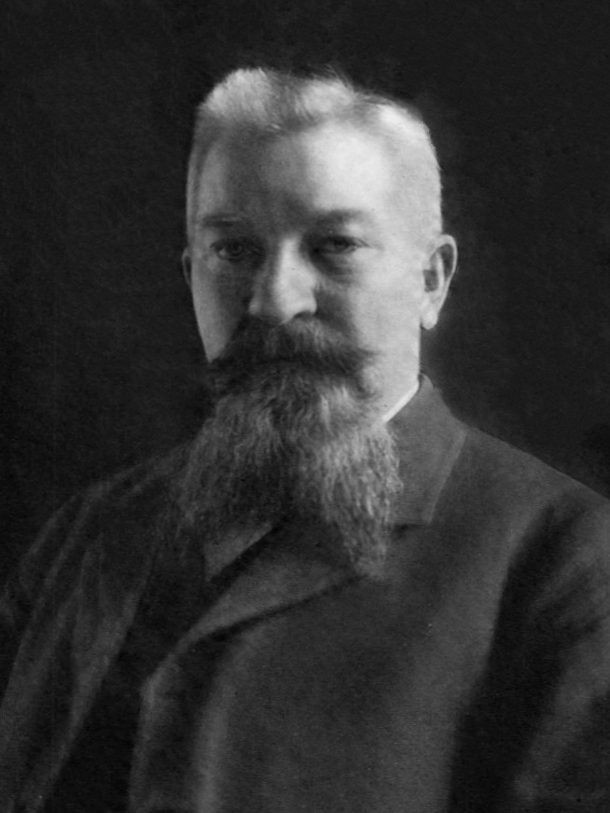
- Born: 24 December 1850; Fivelstad Östergötland County, Sweden
- Died: 15 February 1913 (aged 62); Stockholm, Sweden
- Scientific career
- Fields: Zoology, entomology

Arvid Filip Trybom (24 December 1850 – 15 February 1913) was a Swedish zoologist and entomologist. He participated in major zoological research trips and in 1876 he was an entomologist in Adolf Erik Nordenskiöld's expedition to the Yenisei River. In 1877, he investigated the fauna of the Kola Peninsula and Murman. He specialised in Odonata and Thysanoptera. He later became a fish biologist and fisheries inspector.
