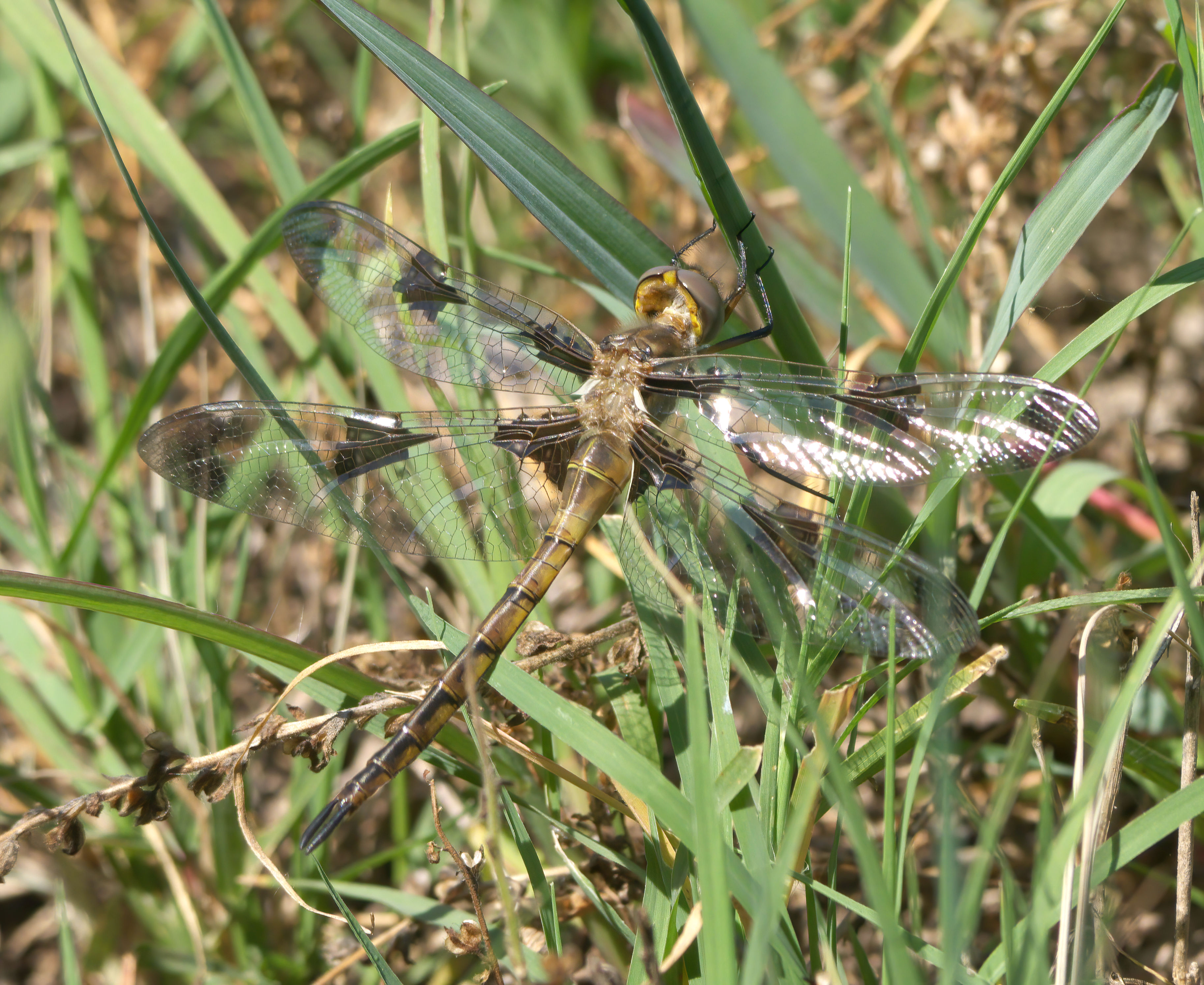

Conservation status
- Least Concern (IUCN 3.1)

Scientific classification
- Kingdom: Animalia
- Phylum: Arthropoda
- Class: Insecta
- Order: Odonata
- Infraorder: Anisoptera
- Family: Corduliidae
- Genus: Epitheca
- Species: E. princeps

Binomial name
- Epitheca princeps Hagen, 1861

= Epitheca princeps =

Species of dragonfly

Epitheca princeps, the prince baskettail, is a species of emerald dragonfly in the family Corduliidae. It is found in North America.

The IUCN conservation status of Epitheca princeps is "LC", least concern, with no immediate threat to the species' survival. The population is stable. The IUCN status was reviewed in 2017.

== Subspecies ==
These two subspecies belong to the species Epitheca princeps:

- Epitheca princeps princeps Hagen, 1861
- Epitheca princeps regina (Hagen in Selys, 1871)
