= Corduliidae =

- Somatochlora viridiaenea (male)

Scientific classification
- Kingdom: Animalia
- Phylum: Arthropoda
- Clade: Pancrustacea
- Class: Insecta
- Order: Odonata
- Suborder: Anisoptera
- Superfamily: Libelluloidea
- Family: Corduliidae; Selys, 1850

Subfamilies
- Cordulephyinae; Corduliinae; Idomacromiinae; Neophyinae
- Distribution of Corduliidae

Family of insects

Corduliidae, also knowns as the emeralds, emerald dragonflies, or green-eyed skimmers, is a family of dragonflies. These dragonflies are usually black or dark brown with areas of metallic green or yellow, and most of them have large, emerald-green eyes. The larvae are black, hairy-looking, and usually semiaquatic. This family include species called "baskettails", "emeralds", "sundragons", "shadowdragons", and "boghaunters". They are not uncommon and are found nearly worldwide, but some individual species are quite rare. Hine's emerald dragonfly (Somatochlora hineana), for example, is an endangered species in the United States.

Corduliidae are known to occasionally take quantities of their eggs at the tip of their stomach, before then sticking their eggs in mud or water using a sprout-like appendage that extends from their abdomens.

== Genera ==
The following genera are currently placed in Corduliidae:

- Antipodochlora Fraser, 1939 – dusk dragonfly
- Cordulia Leach, 1815 – American emeralds
- Corduliochlora Marinov & Seidenbusch, 2007
- Cordulisantosia Fleck & Costa, 2007
- Dorocordulia Needham, 1901 – little emeralds
- Epitheca Burmeister, 1839 – baskettails
- Guadalca Kimmins, 1957
- Helocordulia Needham, 1901 – sundragons
- Hemicordulia Selys, 1870 - emeralds
- Heteronaias Needham & Gyger, 1937
- Metaphya Laidlaw, 1912 – emeralds
- Navicordulia Machado & Costa, 1995
- Neurocordulia Selys, 1871 – shadowdragons
- Paracordulia Martin, 1906
- Rialla Navás, 1915
- Somatochlora Selys, 1871 – striped emeralds
- Williamsonia Davis, 1913 – boghaunters

== Fossil record ==
Fossils attributed to Corduliidae are known from the Eocene onward. Most fossil occurrences are from Europe, with additional records from Australia and North America.

=== Fossil genera ===
The following fossil genera are currently assigned to Corduliidae:

- †Cellulocordulia Riou & Nel, 1995
- †Croatocordulia Kiauta, 1969
- †Miocordulia Kennedy, 1931
- †Molercordulia Bechly, 2005
- †Stenogomphus Scudder, 1892

== Etymology ==
The family name Corduliidae is derived from the type genus Cordulia, with the standard zoological suffix -idae used for animal families.

The genus name Cordulia is derived from the Greek κορδύλη (kordylē, "club" or "cudgel"), referring to the shape of the male abdomen.
