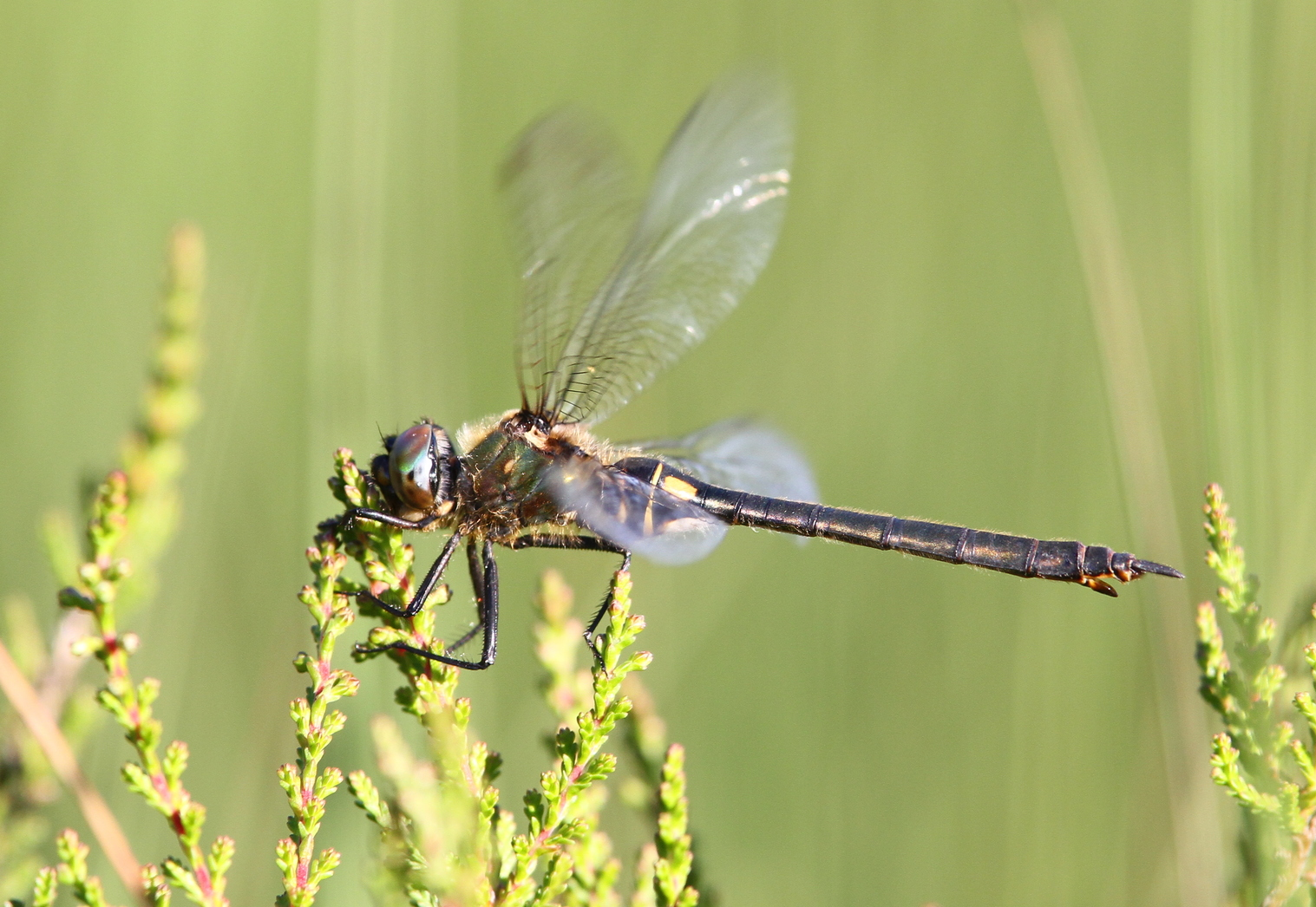
- Female photographed in Grassau, Germany
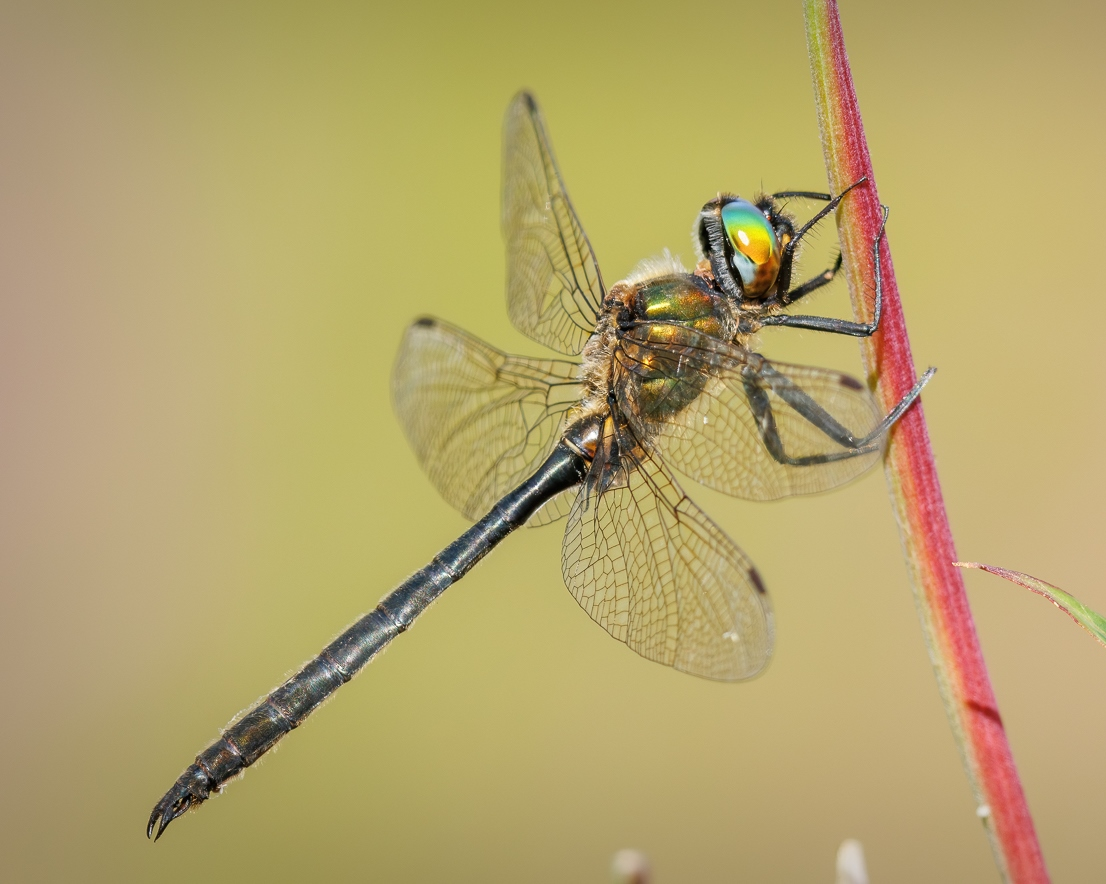
- Male photographed in Ørland, Norway

Conservation status
- Least Concern (IUCN 3.1)

Scientific classification
- Kingdom: Animalia
- Phylum: Arthropoda
- Clade: Pancrustacea
- Class: Insecta
- Order: Odonata
- Infraorder: Anisoptera
- Family: Corduliidae
- Genus: Somatochlora
- Species: S. arctica

Binomial name
- Somatochlora arctica (Zetterstedt, 1840)

Synonyms
- Aeshna arctica Zetterstedt, 1840; Cordulia subalpina Sélys, 1840; Somatochlora gratiosa Bartenev, 1909

= Northern emerald =

Species of dragonfly

The northern emerald (Somatochlora arctica) is a species of emerald dragonfly found in northern and middle Eurasia. The species was first described in 1840 from Scandinavia. It is a relatively small dragonfly, just 4 to 5 centimetres (1.6 to 2.0 in) long, and is recognizable by its hairy thorax, dark abdomen, and bright green eyes. The males have narrowly waisted abdomens, while the females have straight ones; the females are also recognizable by the two lateral yellow spots behind the thorax. Northern emeralds pass two years as larvae in sphagnum-rich bog pools before emerging as adults which hunt above peat bogs, wet meadows, and open woodlands. Despite being assessed as a least-concern species by the IUCN, northern emeralds are threatened by habitat loss caused by human activity, and climate change is expected to exacerbate the problem. The northern emerald is found from Japan and the Kamchatka Peninsula through much of Russia. It is abundant throughout Fennoscandia, and is also well-known from the Alps and the Scottish Highlands. Its distribution in lowland Europe is sparse, but the dragonflies can be hard to find and record.

== Taxonomy ==
The northern emerald is known scientifically as Somatochlora arctica and is placed in the family Corduliidae. The genus Somatochlora, known as the "striped emeralds", includes 42 species found across the Holarctic realm. It is the largest genus of the family Corduliidae.The binomial name comprises two parts: the genus name, Somatochlora, is composed of the Greek-derived prefix somato- ('body') and adjective chlorus, used in taxonomy to mean 'green'. The species epithet is derived from the feminine form of the Latin arcticus, meaning 'northern', or, indeed, 'arctic'.

=== Taxonomic history ===
The northern emerald was first scientifically described under the name Aeschna arctica in 1840 by Johan Wilhelm Zetterstedt. Zetterstedt provided a brief physical description and wrote he had discovered the dragonfly in August of 1821, noting it was found in sub-alpine parts of Finland and Norway. The original description was published in his thousand-page work Insecta Lapponica, a description of the insects of Lapland intended to supplement Linnaeus' Fauna Svecica of nearly a century before.

The very same year as Zetterstedt published his description, Belgian aristocrat and entomologist Edmond de Sélys Longchamps – considered a "founder of odonatology" – described a species he called Cordulia subalpina from Belgium. In a paper in the journal Bulletins de l'Académie Royale des Sciences et Belles-Lettres de Bruxelles (Note: lit. transl. "Bulletin of the Brussels Royal Academy of Sciences and Literature") he described a species, discovered in June 1840 by Monsieur Putzeys, a Crown prosecutor in Arlon. He noted it was similar to Somatochlora alpestris (then called Cordulia alpestris).

Ten years later, de Sélys published a comprehensive book, Review of the Odonates or Libellules of Europe, (Note: Revue des Odonates ou Libellules d'Europe) in which he gave Zetterstedt credit for ths species, listing his own Cordulia subalpina as a junior synonym. However, he did reclassify Zetterstedt's species into the genus Cordulia, producing the new name Cordulia arctica. Sélys also provided a detailed physical description and described its distribution: Belgium, Norway, Sweden, Finland, and, thanks to a specimen recorded by a Mr. Weaver, Scotland. (Note: Specifically, from Loch Rannoch in Perthshire)

In 1871, de Sélys published Synopsis des Cordulines and classified it in the subgenus Epitheca. He returned in 1887 to finally reclassify it in into Somatochlora, noting its range as cold and temperate Europe, Siberia, and Transcaucasia. Sélys died in 1900. In 1909, Russian zoologist Aleksandr Bartenev described a new species, Somatochlora gratiosa, from Siberia. This species would stand as an accepted taxon until 1958 when Japanese entomologist Syoziro Asahina synonymized it with S. arctica.

=== Phylogenetics ===
Classification within the genus Somatochlora was traditionally based on physical characteristics, especially of the nymphs, the wing venation, and the morphology of the anal appendages (see § Description). However, these characteristics "are highly prone" to convergent evolution, making genetic-based research necessary to work out the true evolutionary relationships between species. A 2025 paper published in the journal Systematic Entomology did just that. The phylogenetic tree their research suggested that Somatochlora arctica was most closely related to a clade comprising Somatochlora franklini, S. forcipata, S. dido, and S. incurvata. However, the exact placement of the species was unresolved and contradicted previous analyses. Their research also found that S. arctica, S. franklini and S. incurvata had all likely diverged approximately five million years ago, in the end of the Miocene epoch – the most recent divergences within the genus.

Somatochlora arctica group

- - - Somatochlora kennedyi
    - - Somatochlora daviesi
      - Somatochlora georgiana
  - - Somatochlora arctica
    - - Somatochlora franklini
      - - Somatochlora forcipata
        - - Somatochlora dido
          - Somatochlora incurvata

After Goodman et al. 2025

== Description ==
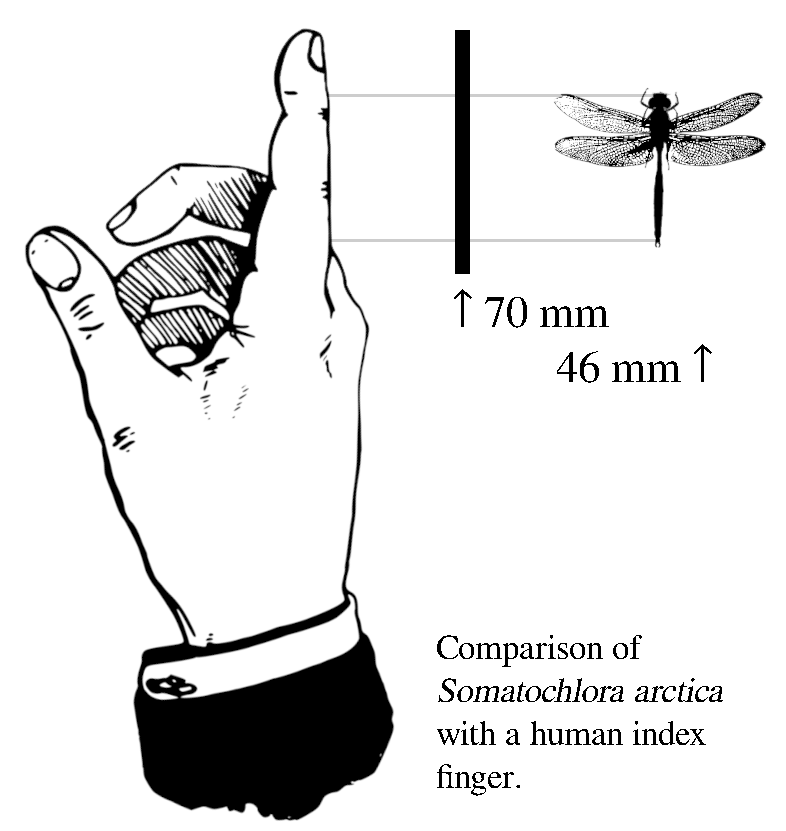
Approximate comparison of a medium-sized northern emerald with a human index finger.

Members of the genus Somatochlora are generally medium-sized dragonflies with metallic green to black colouration and bright green eyes. Northern emeralds (Somatochlora arctica) are smallish dragonflies with dark abdomens and lighter, hairy thoraxes, usually measuring from 41 to 51 millimetres (1.6 to 2.0 in) long and a wingspan of around 67 millimetres (2.6 in). The colour of the abdomen is blackish, while the head and thorax are bronzey green. Females have two characteristic oval yellow spots on the abdomen next to the thorax, similar to spots on brilliant emerald females. Both sexes have characteristic yellow spots on their faces next to the eyes, which are bright green in mature individuals.

Northern emerald wings are not completely clear but rather are "suffused with a yellowish tint" which becomes strongest close to the leading edge of the wing. The base of the wings is also pale ochre, especially the male inferior wing. Populations of the dragonflies in west Siberia, particularly in bogs on the Vasyugan Plain, exhibit wings "smoked" with amber-brown. A similar phenomenon has been recorded in Somatochlora flavomaculata specimens from the same area. The pterostigmata – pigmented spots on the front corners of each wing – are black-brown in males and dark brown in adult females, paler brown in immature ones. The accessory membrane, a small membrane at the base of the wing next to the thorax considered useful for identification, is white in both sexes, but narrower in the female. The legs are mixed black and brown in colour. The male legs are more predominantly black, with only one side of the first femur (third segment) brown; the females are more so, with all the femurs being brown.

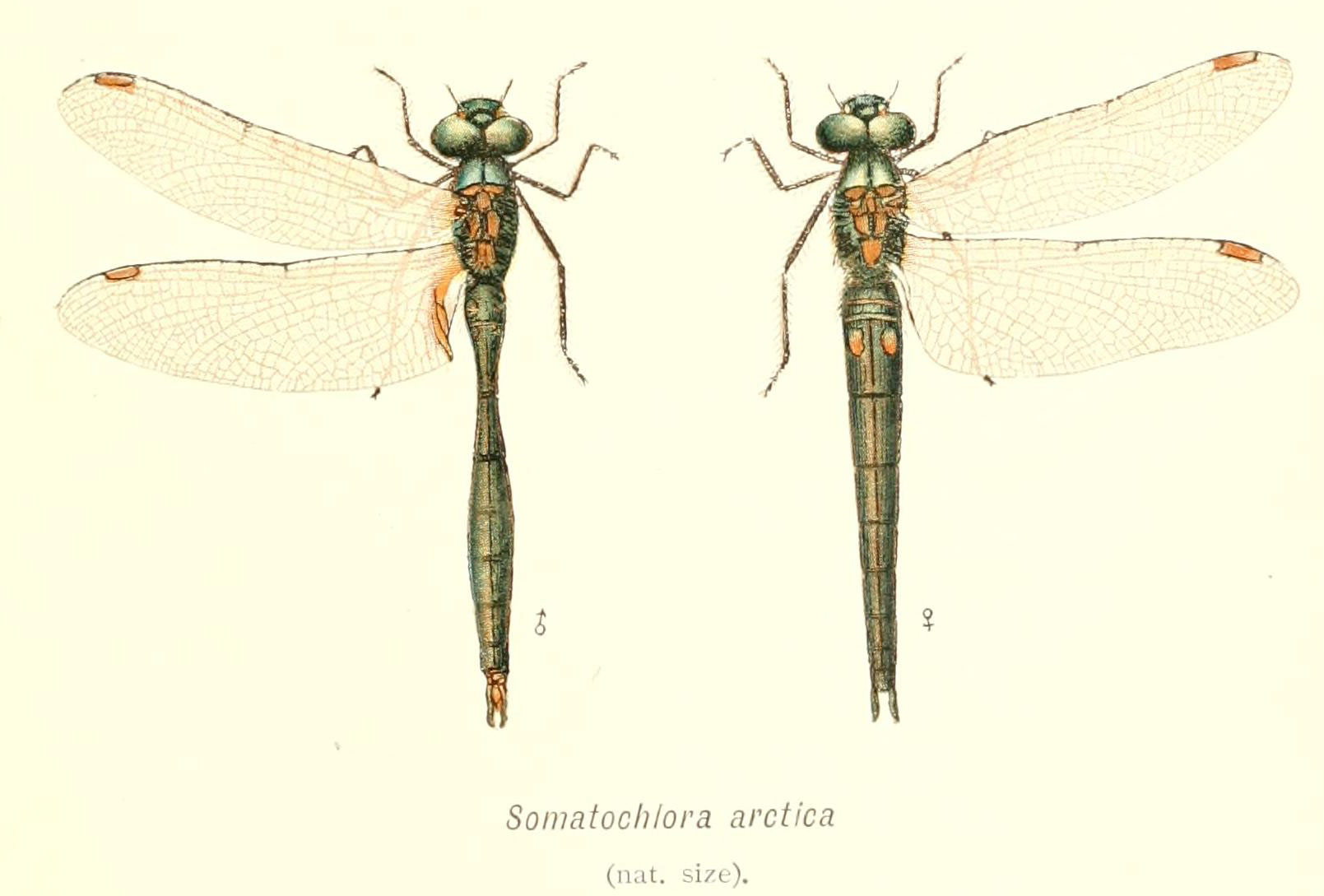
Illustration of male (left) and female.

Males are distinctive because the two segments of the abdomen closest to the thorax, and the base of the third, are enlarged such that the dragonfly superficially appears to have a long thorax and a shortened abdomen. The abdomen has a narrow waist and then widens again, being widest in the middle. Females have abdomens without a narrowed waist: seen from above, they are a rectangular shape, tapering gently towards the top.

The tip of the final, tenth segment of a dragonfly abdomen carries a set of short appendages. Both sexes have an upper pair called cerci or upper anal appendages but males additionally have a pair of lower appendages called the epiprocts. In females, the upper appendages are small and "leaf-like". The male upper appendages are rather long and shaped like calipers; the epiprocts are smaller, short, triangular, and slightly curved. The female's vulvar scale – an organ possessed by some dragonflies similar to an ovipositor "used to 'throw' eggs rather less precisely" – is "triangular, pointed, and spout-like." It departs the abdomen at about a 30° angle and is a little longer than the ninth abdominal segment.

Northern emeralds are physically similar to alpine emeralds, Somatochlora alpestris, and must be distinguished mainly on the basis of the morphology of the anal appendages. The physical similarity lead to the two species being traditionally grouped together. However, the 2025 phylogenetic study noted that the physical commonalities used to group S. arctica with S. alpestris were often subject to convergent evolution. Their molecular study found this classification incorrect, with S. arctica and S. alpestris belonging to quite different groups within the genus.

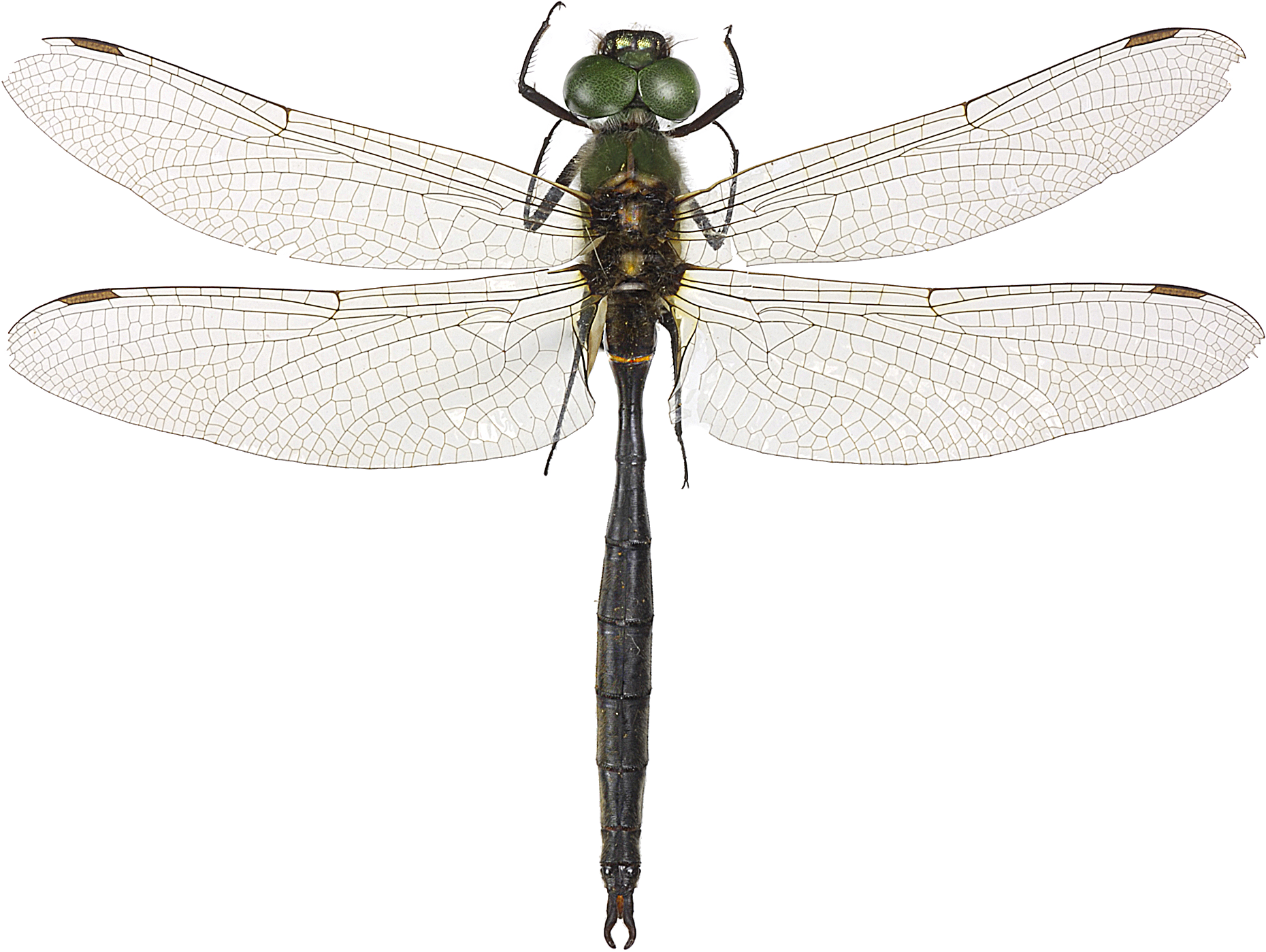
Male, identifiable by the caliper-shaped anal appendages and the narrow-waisted abdomen.

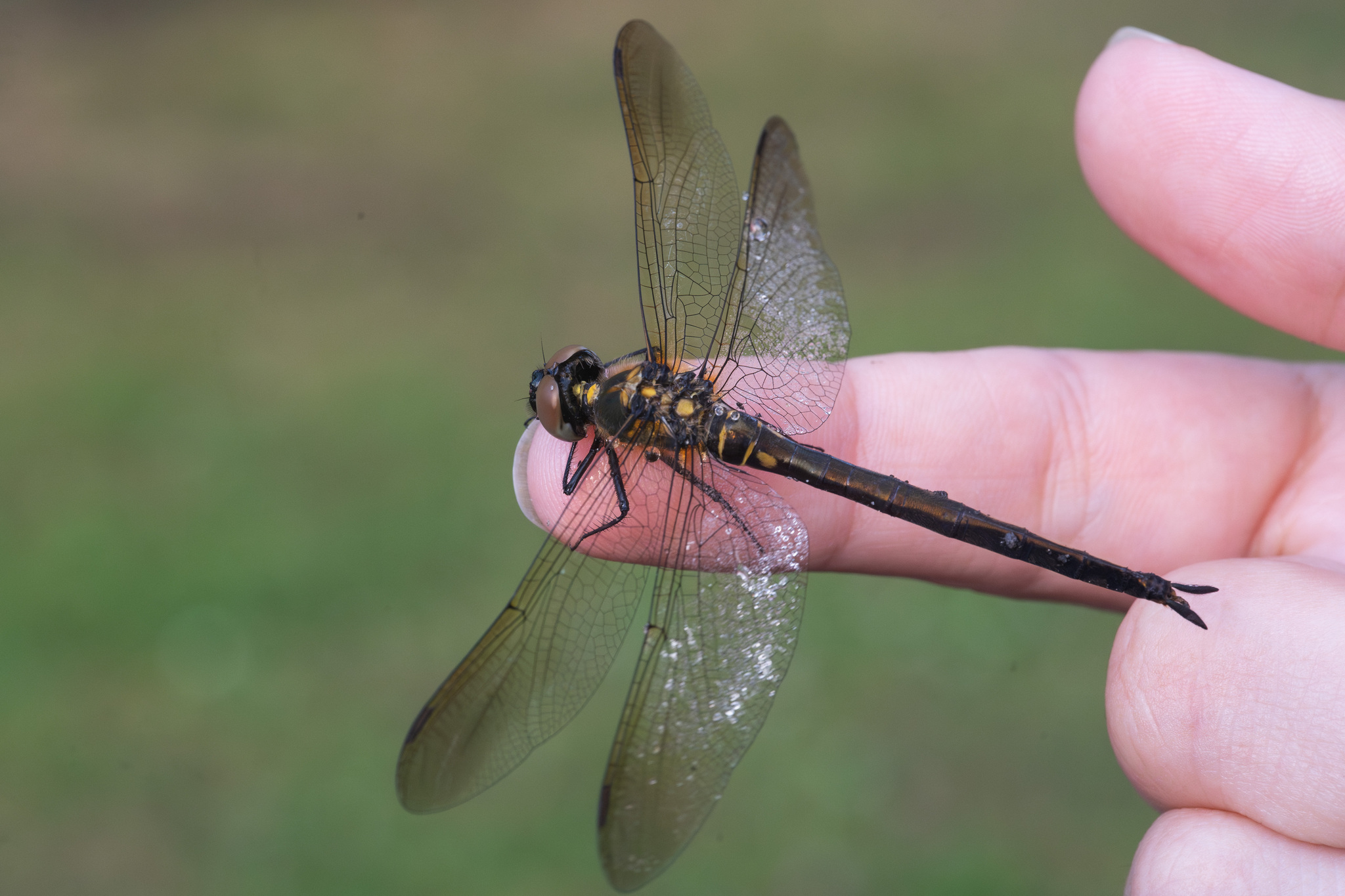
Female, identifiable by the straight, leaf-like anal appendages, paired yellow spots, and the unwaisted abdomen. Note also the yellowish tint towards the leading edges of the wings.

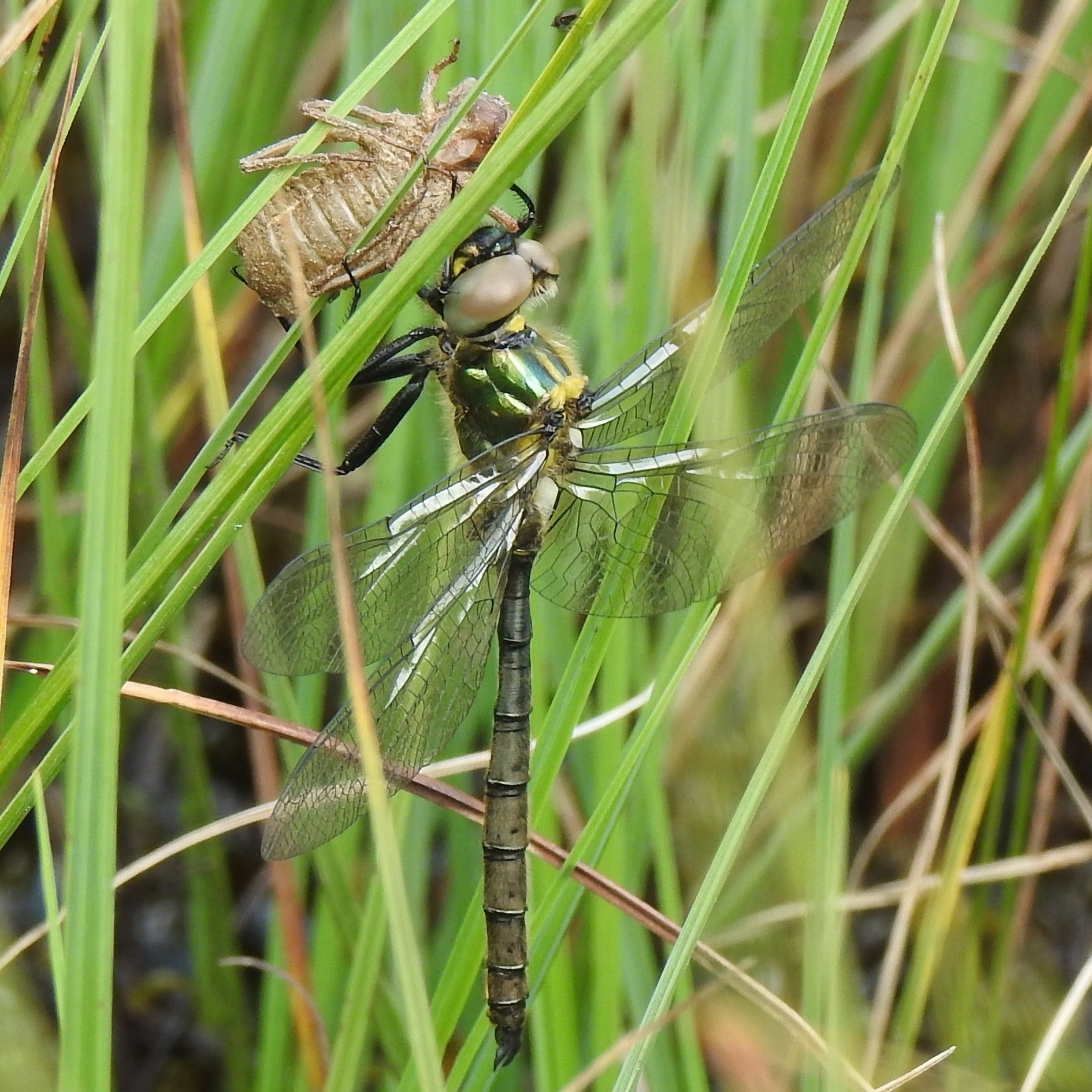
Teneral northern emerald next to exuvium

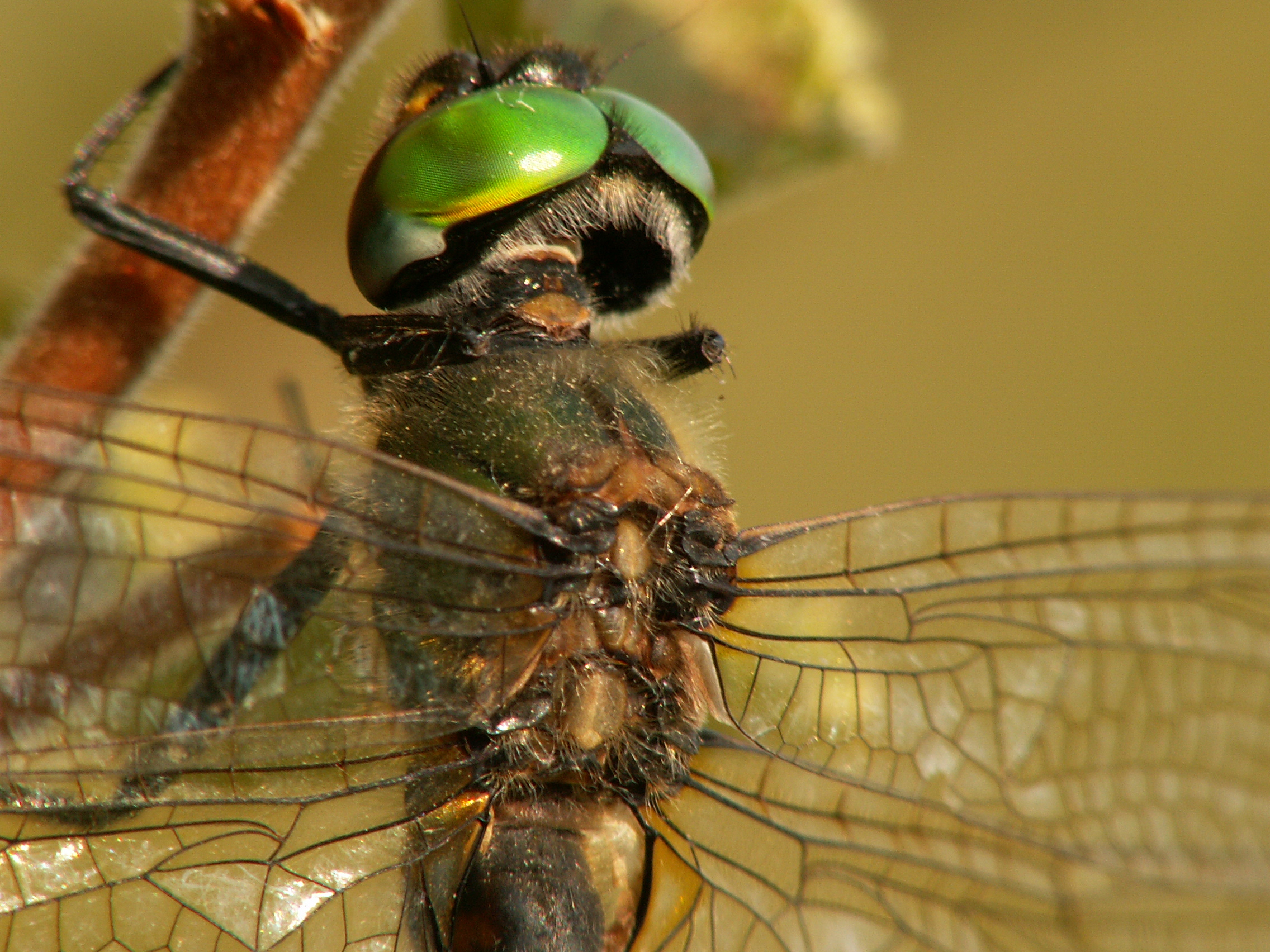
Male showing the characteristically hairy thorax.

== Reproduction and development ==
Northern emerald mating behaviour

Images
- Mating wheel photographed in Jutland, Denmark

Video
- Mating wheel (Dutch narration)

Northern emeralds mate in what is called the "wheel formation". First, using the appendages on the tip of his abdomen, the male grasps the female behind the head: this is called the "tandem formation". The male leads the female into the tree canopy. She then curls her abdomen to the male's secondary genitalia, which are located on the underside of his thorax. By this means the female's eggs are fertilized. Mating takes up to an hour. Once it is done, the female leaves to deposit her eggs alone. (In some dragonfly species, the male guards the female while she does this.) Usual oviposition sites are small pools closely protected by vegetation, such as in clumps of underwater sphagnum moss.

The larva is the "main life stage" for the northern emerald dragonfly, and it lasts at least two years. Northern emerald larvae are distinctly hairy creatures, and moult several times during their development. The larval abdomen has no spines on the back or sides, unlike some other Somatochlora species, and the hind-leg's third and longest segment (femur) is relatively short, reaching only as far as the abdomen's sixth segment. The larva's "mask" – actually the prehensile lower lip, extended to catch prey – has numerous somewhat shallow crenations, each sprouting five bristles. They are squat, and their longish legs give them a spider-like appearance. A mature larva is usually between 17 to 20 millimetres (0.67 to 0.79 in) long, or less than half the size of the adult. Between May and June, mature larvae clamber out from the water and onto the stems of nearby plants such as sedges. Over the process of two hours, the adult dragonfly emerges, leaving behind an exuvium: the larva's last skin. The callow then takes a short "maiden flight", usually into available woodland canopy. Several days can pass before the callow develops its mature colouration. The adults only live for eight weeks – or fewer.

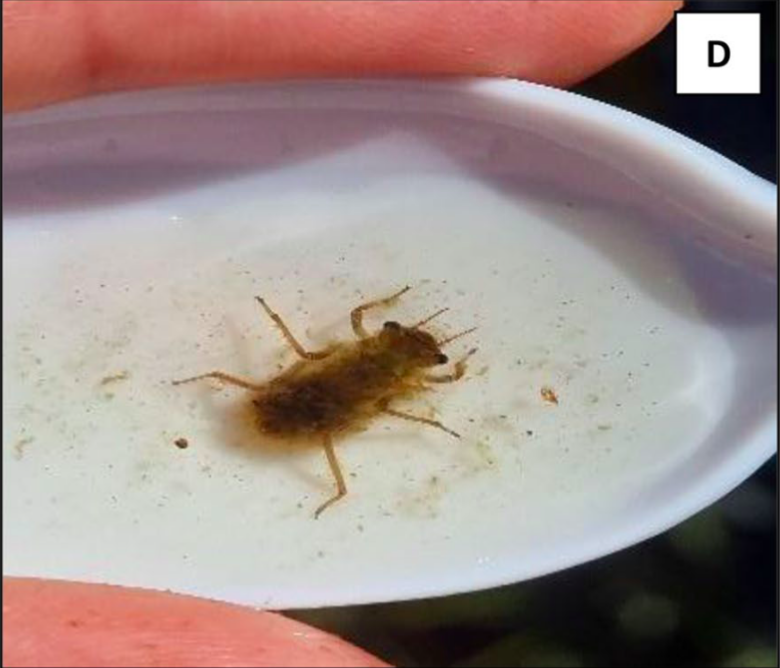
Larva held in a collection container

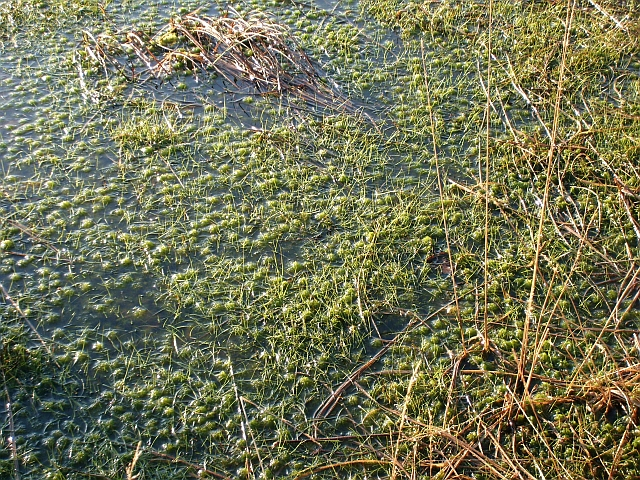
Larvae can be found in sphagnum-rich bog pools such as this one.

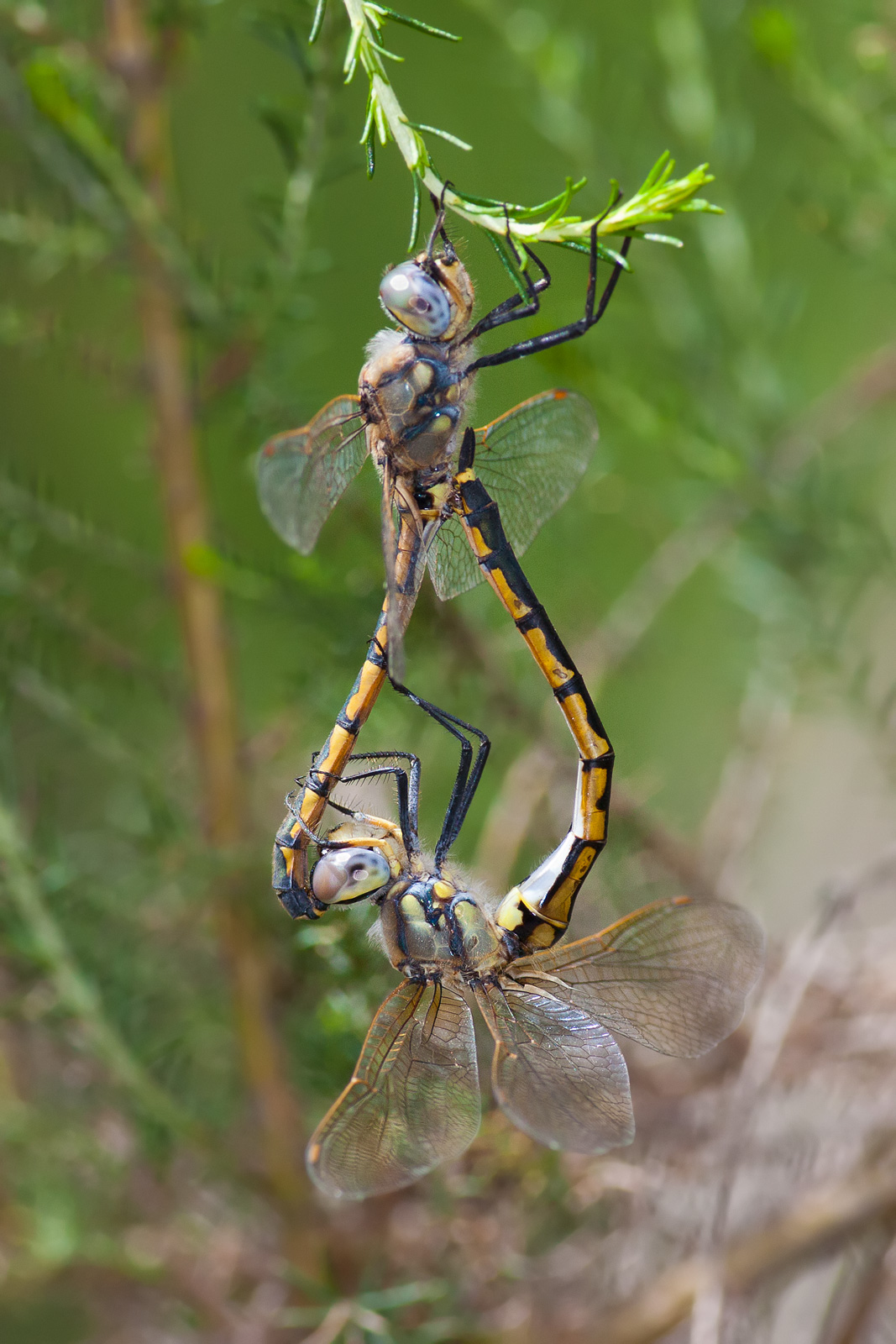
"Mating wheel" of the tau emerald, a related species. The male is on the left.

== Behaviour and activity ==
Though they are most often seen in July, the northern emerald flight period generally extends from late May to the middle of September. Northern emeralds are swift predators who hunt in and around bog habitats, usually flying rather low. The males patrol potential breeding grounds and search for females, but generally don't linger in one area long. The males are aggressive and frequently come into conflict. Two rivals will soar up to 4 metres (13 ft) above the bog before dropping rapidly, flying circles tightly around each other and then separating.

Kenneth Morton described their flight habits in Austria thus in a 1928 paper:

They flew as a rule only a foot or two above the herbage, an almost stationary hovering flight alternating with short darting forward movements; only once a higher, more joyous looking, flight was noted when the atmospheric conditions were stiller (not to be confused with the high, backwards and forwards flight of adolescent examples in sheltered sunlit places in the woods, or the occasional extended rapid flights which are probably of an exploratory nature).

== Habitat ==
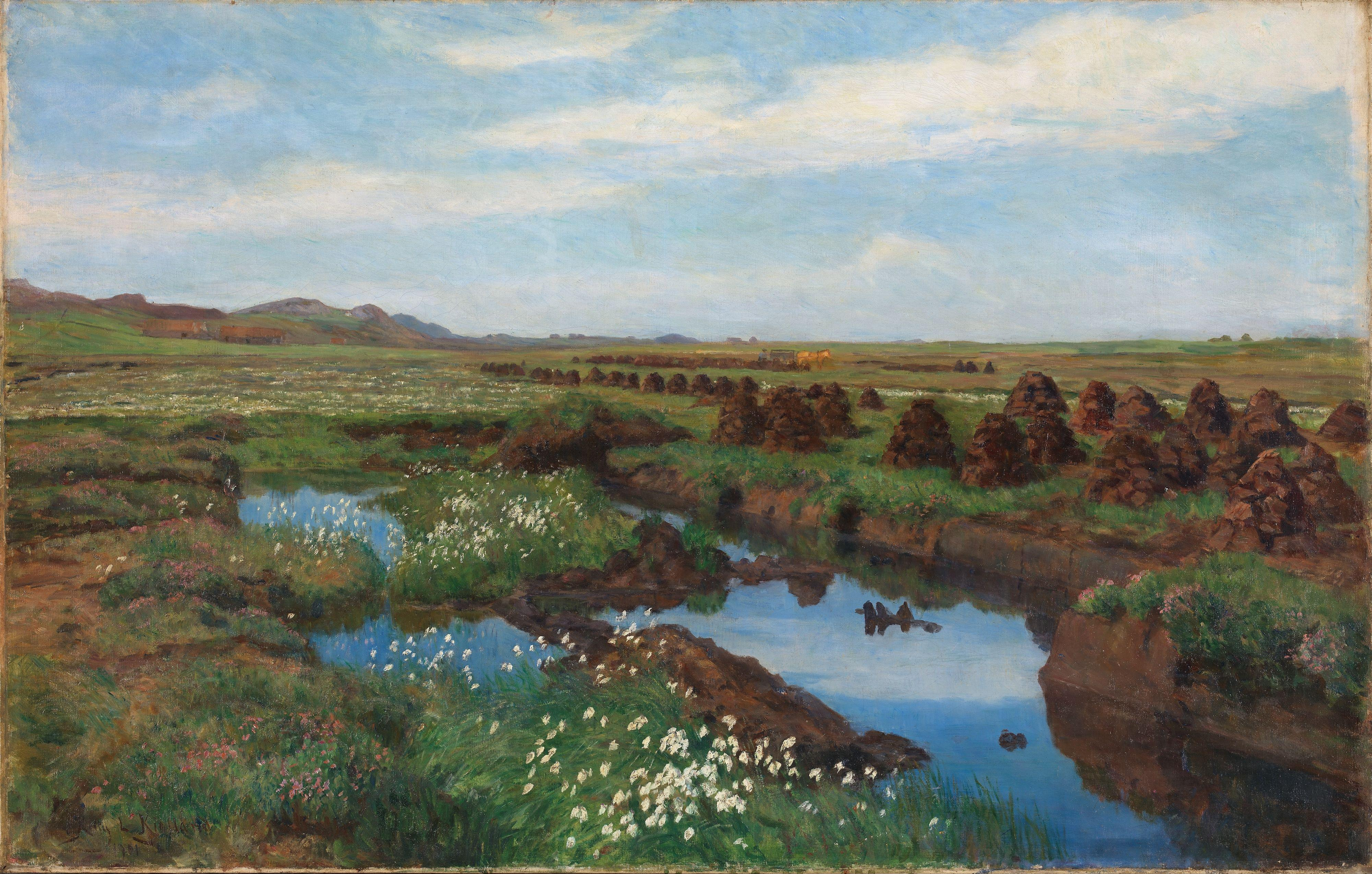
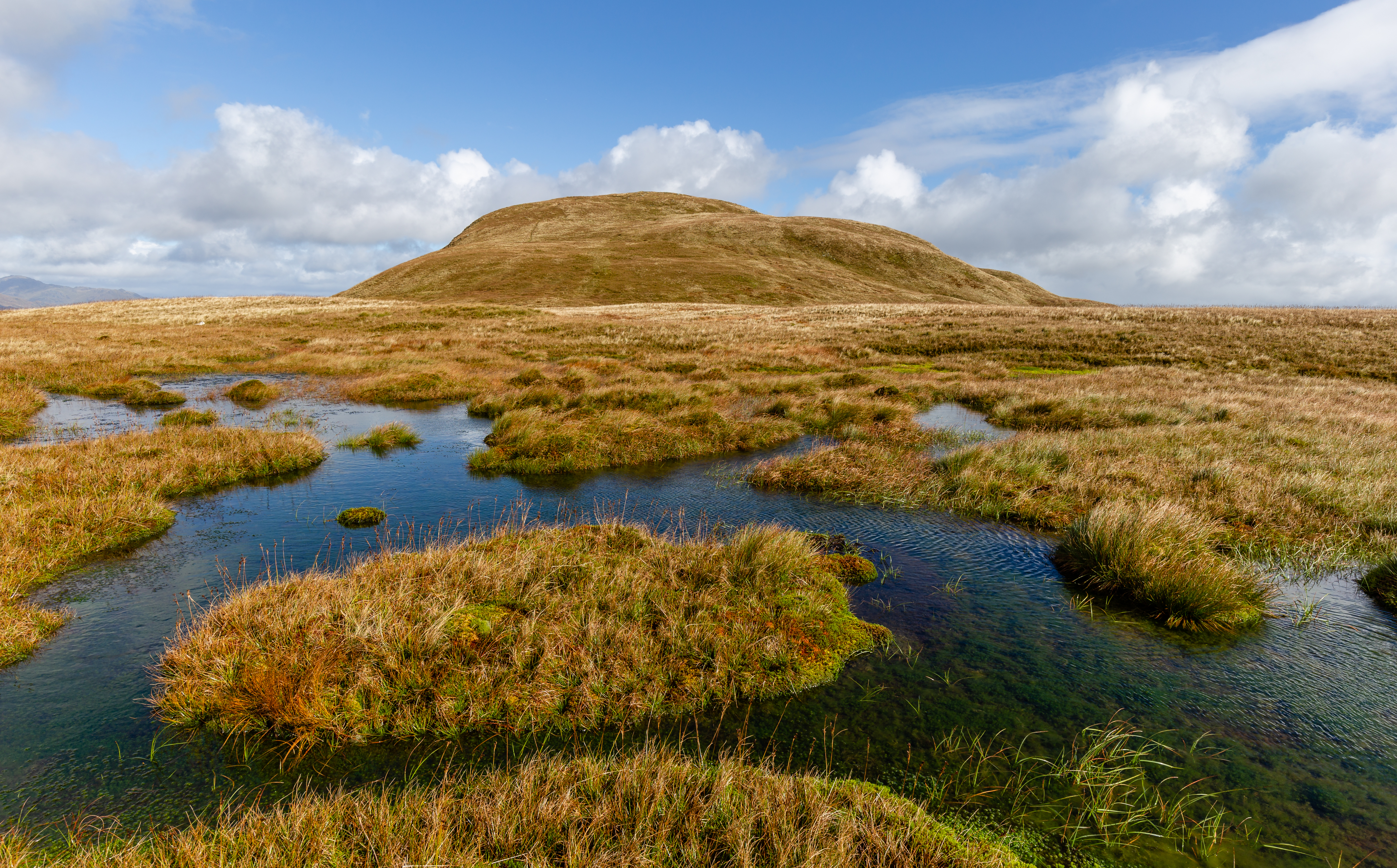
Northern emeralds can be found around peat bogs such as this one in southern Norway painted by Kitty Kielland (left), or this one in Scotland's Luss Hills (right).

The northern emerald is regarded as a "bog specialist". The larvae develop and hunt in bog pools, especially among waterlogged sphagnum moss; adults can be found flying around bogs, in wet meadows and heaths, open woodlands, and lightly treed moors. Early 20th century observations made by Kenneth Morton in the Austrian Tyrol reported them to be found abundantly in wet meadows there.

Breeding often takes place in wet areas close to woodlands where adults hunt. A 2024 study published in the Journal of Insect Conservation looked at the prevalence of northern emerald larvae in different habitat conditions. They found that there was little correlation between S. arctica larvae abundance and water acidity, temperature, or depth, but they were significantly more abundant in "pools located close to woodland and with high Sphagnum coverage". The larvae usually live in clumps of moss about 15 centimetres (1/2 ft) beneath the surface of bog pools. When pools dry up, larvae have been found in deep clumps of wet, half-rotten moss up to 30 centimetres (1 ft) below the surface. Because of their elusiveness, the larvae are hard to find for observation: one field guide recommends sifting through clumps of underwater sphagnum with a sieve or colander to catch them.

In Scandinavia, the dragonflies are found close to sea level, but in the more southerly parts of their range, such as in the Alps, they are found in subalpine regions. In the montane part of their range, they are replaced at higher altitudes by S. alpestris. They are most common 835 to 2,205 metres (2,740 to 7,234 ft) above sea level, but there is one record of a female depositing eggs at just 550 metres (1,800 ft) in a clump of sphagnum moss.

Even in areas where S. arctica overlaps with S. alpestris, the two occupy different habitat niches: S. alpestris usually hunts over open water areas, while S. arctica covers the wet meadows. Morton describes a small stream, one part with clear water, another occupied by reeds. S. alpestris was only found in the small open water area, while S. arctica was only found among the directly adjacent reeds and nearby meadow.

== Distribution ==
Northern emeralds are found throughout the northern Palearctic realm, holding a scattered distribution from Ireland to Japan between approximately the 40th and 74th parallels. The IUCN Red List describes a scattered distribution in Europe, broadly centred on a diamond cornered by Switzerland, the Netherlands, Slovakia, and the northern Scandinavian Peninsula.

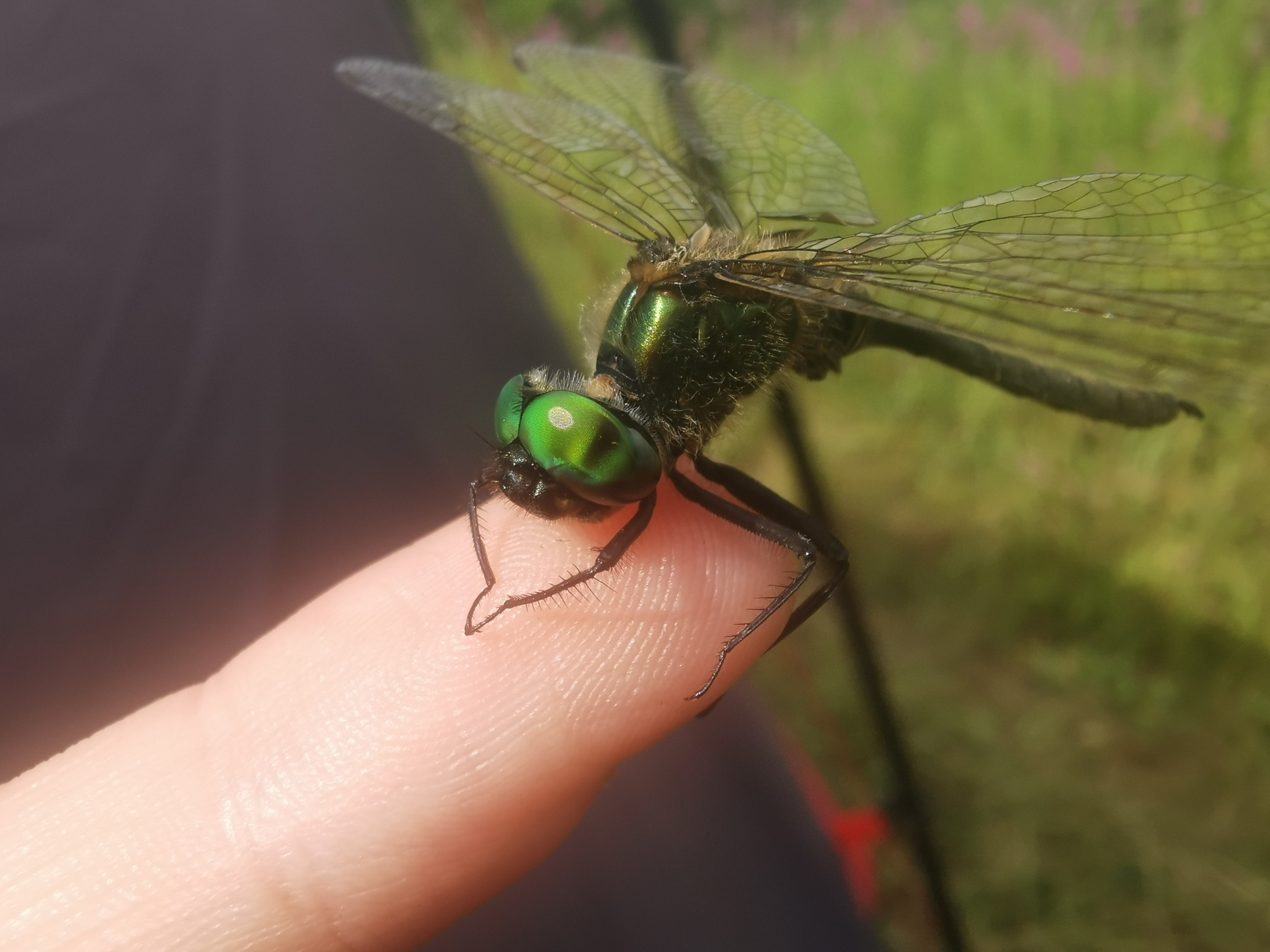
This northern emerald was found on the Kamchatka Peninsula, at the eastern extremity of its range.

Though common throughout Fennoscandia, its distribution in mainland Europe outside of the Alps is thin. It is scarce in western Europe but common in upland areas of central Europe, particularly in the Alps of France, Switzerland, north Italy, and west Austria. In the Netherlands, it is only found in a few locations on the eastern border and is considered rare; nearby, it is found in the Ardennes, elsewhere eastern France, and in the Massif Central. They are also recorded from the Pyrenees. In Poland, the northern emerald is a rare species, It is known from a few alpine peat bogs in Romania, where its habitat is threatened from climate change.Its distribution outside of Europe is even sparser, with patchy observations throughout Russia, as well as in northern Japan, North Korea, Manchuria, and southern Kazakhstan. It is common in the wetlands of the Vasguyan Plain in central Russia, which are the largest peatlands in the world. In Japan, northern emeralds have been recorded from Nagano in central Honshū and Hokkaido. In the Russian Far East, it is found in the disputed islands of Kunashir and Iturup, the Kamchatka Peninsula and the isle of Sakhalin.

== Conservation ==
The northern emerald is considered by the IUCN to be of least concern globally due to the breadth and diversity of its range. In much of its Eurasian range, it is not endangered and fairly common. In central and southern Europe, however, the species is scarce, and loss of habitat could initiate a "rapid decline" in population in the region. According to the IUCN, the global population trend is unknown, and the number of mature individuals has not been estimated. However, the population is believed to be "severely fragmented". Populations tend towards the small, but the species is difficult to observe and track because of its "discrete" nature. The main threat to the dragonflies is loss of habitat through various means. The drainage of peat bogs for human agriculture, infrastructure, or for "industrial peat extraction", all threaten them, as does afforestation. Climate change is likely to exacerbate habitat losses through the desiccation of peat bogs.

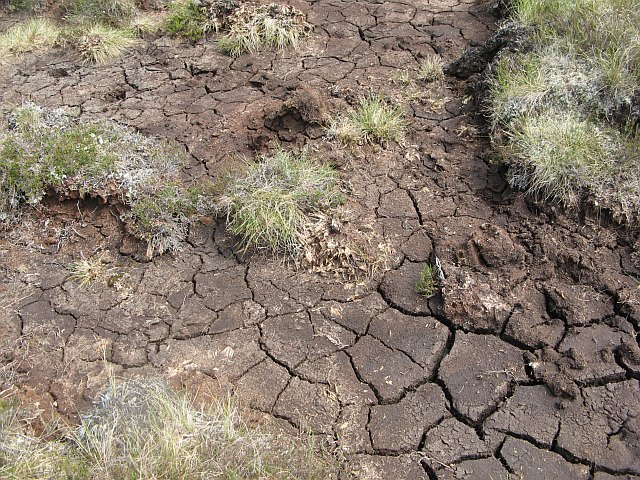
Northern emeralds are threatened by peat bogs drying out, like this one in the Scottish Highlands has.

In Central Asia, northern emeralds are naturally scarce, found only in vulnerable, isolated populations. The IUCN has warned that climate change could decimate these small amounts of available habitat for the dragonflies in Central Asia and thus significantly endanger them there. The dragonflies are already endangered in several European countries: they are assessed as vulnerable in Austria and Poland and critically endangered in Germany and Denmark. A report published in the journal of the Dutch Association for Dragonfly Study described the species as "one of the least known and rarest dragonflies of north-western Europe".

In Great Britain, the species is considered near-threatened, and restricted to the Scottish Highlands north of the Firth of Clyde and west of the Cairngorms. In 2025, the species was added along with several other bog dragonflies to the Scottish Biodiversity List, a register of species significant to conservation efforts. The dragonflies are endangered in Ireland, where they are only found in counties Kerry and Cork, inhabiting "moorland pools and bogs". A 1900 book by William John Lucas describes a roughly similar distribution. According to Steve Brooks and Steve Cham in their 2014 edition of the Field Guide to the Dragonflies and Damselflies of Great Britain and Ireland, the species' range of occurrence in Scotland has doubled since 1982, but due likely to more extensive recording fieldwork – the dragonfly is nonetheless threatened by habitat loss and "undoubtedly is still under-recorded".
