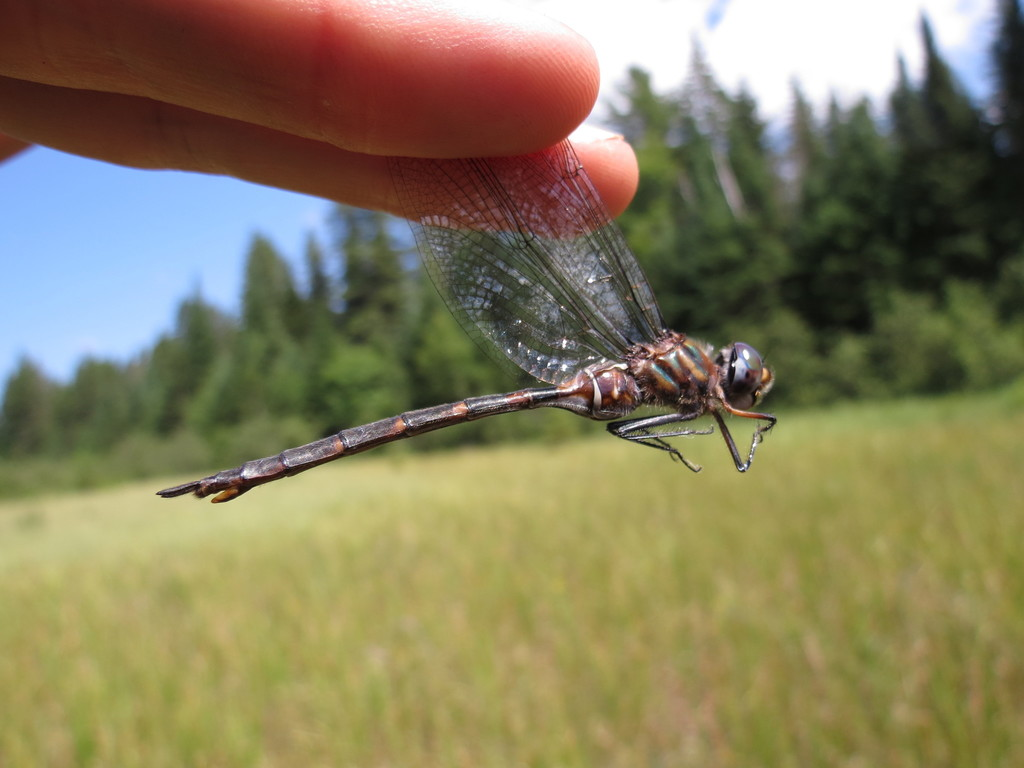
- Female in fen breeding habitat

Conservation status
- Least Concern (IUCN 3.1)

- Secure (NatureServe)

Scientific classification
- Kingdom: Animalia
- Phylum: Arthropoda
- Clade: Pancrustacea
- Class: Insecta
- Order: Odonata
- Infraorder: Anisoptera
- Superfamily: Libelluloidea
- Family: Corduliidae
- Genus: Somatochlora
- Species: S. incurvata

Binomial name
- Somatochlora incurvata Walker, 1918

= Somatochlora incurvata =

Incurvate Emerald

Species of dragonfly

The incurvate emerald (Somatochlora incurvata) is a species of dragonfly in the family Corduliidae. It is found in Canada and the United States. Its natural habitat is fens.

== Taxonomy ==
The incurvate emerald was first described in 1918 by Canadian entomologist Edmund Murton Walker, based on specimens from Whitefish Point, Michigan. At the time, he thought it possible that it was only a "local race" of the closely related forcipate emerald.

== Description ==
Somatochlora incurvata is a medium-sized, slender, elongate dragonfly about 5.8 cm (2.3 in) long. It is larger than many other species in the genus Somatochlora. The thorax and abdomen are metallic brown to black with yellowish brown spots on the sides. The eyes are green.

== Distribution ==
The incurvate emerald has a relatively restricted range in northeastern North America, ranging from Nova Scotia south to New York and west to Wisconsin.

== Habitat ==
Incurvate emeralds are found in bogs and fens. The larvae are thought to reside within saturated Sphagnum moss. Eggs are laid in small pools within the breeding habitat, which may even include temporary depressions created by footprints. Adults may be found foraging in a wide variety of other habitats.

== Life History ==
Like other dragonflies, both larvae and adults feed on smaller insects and other invertebrates. Adults are active in the day from June to October, and the species overwinters as larvae.

== Conservation ==
Formerly thought to be rare, more recent surveys have found that the species is reasonably common in parts of its range. Potential threats include peat harvesting, cranberry farming, water pollution, and alteration of water levels. Incurvate Emerald is ranked as globally secure (G5), but is considered rare in many of the states and provinces it is found.
