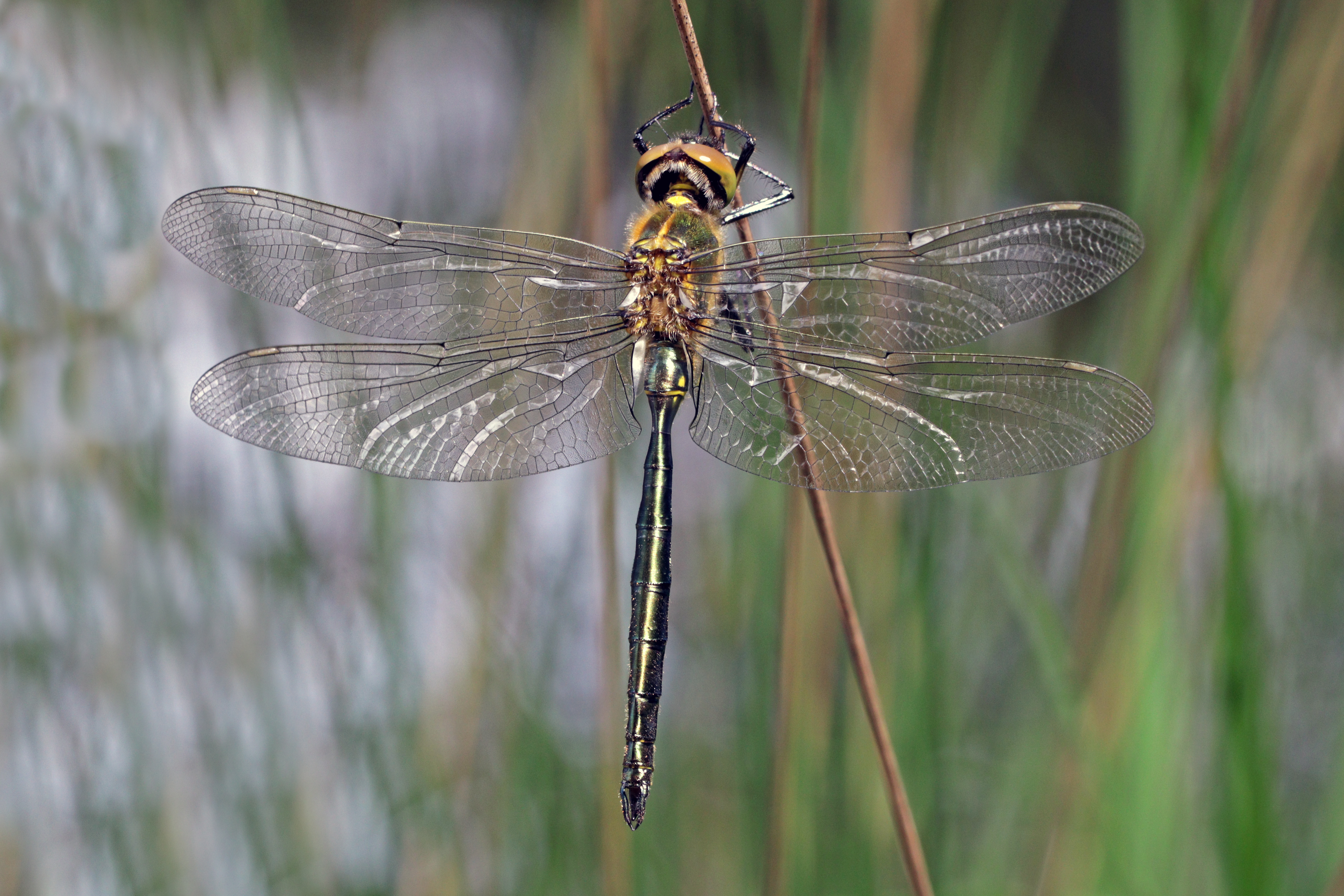
- teneral male
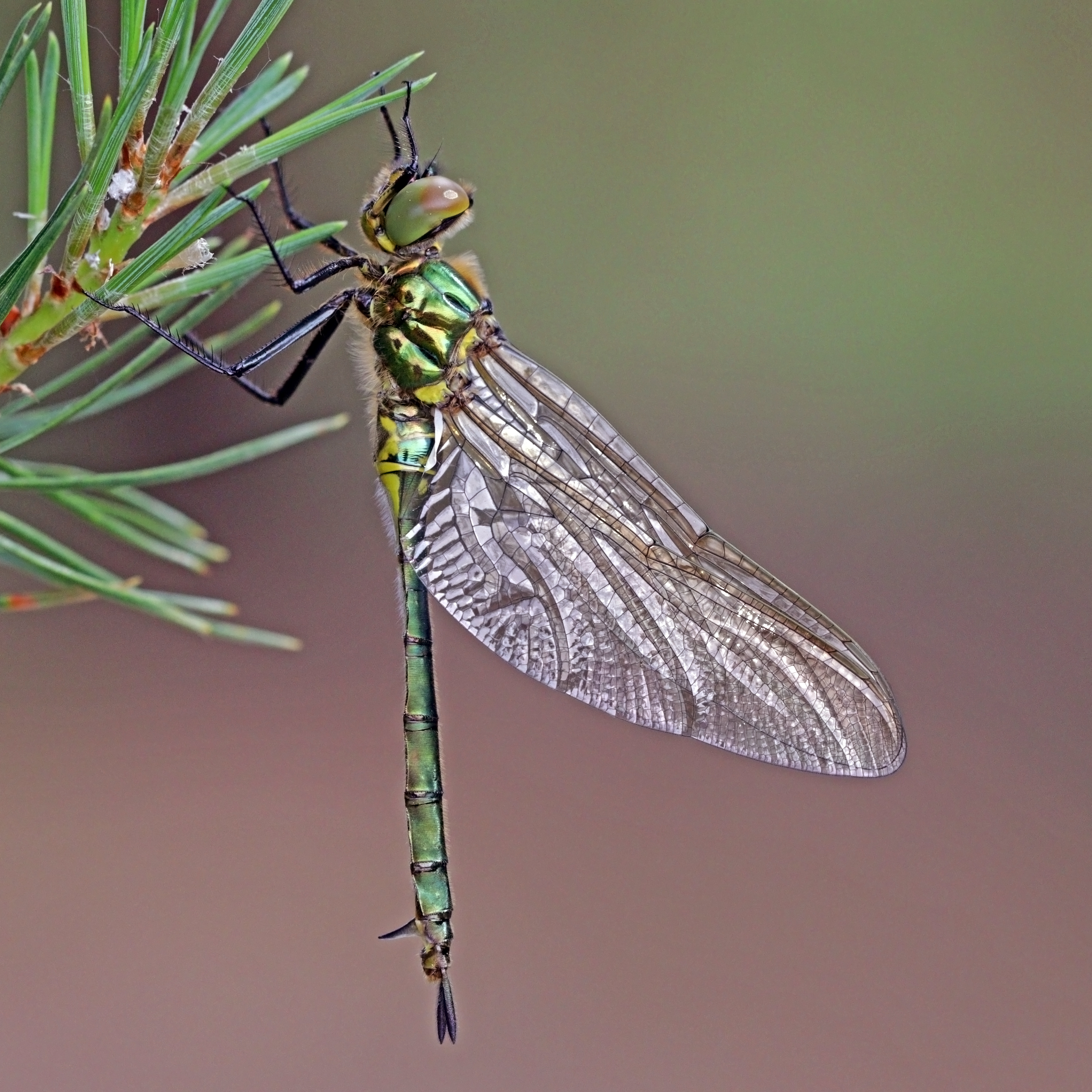
- teneral female both Moat Pond, Thursley Common, Surrey

Conservation status
- Least Concern (IUCN 3.1) Global

- Vulnerable (IUCN 3.1) Europe

Scientific classification
- Kingdom: Animalia
- Phylum: Arthropoda
- Class: Insecta
- Order: Odonata
- Infraorder: Anisoptera
- Family: Corduliidae
- Genus: Somatochlora
- Species: S. metallica

Binomial name
- Somatochlora metallica (Vander Linden, 1825)

Synonyms
- Somatochlora coreana Doi, 1938; Somatochlora vera Bartenev, 1914

= Brilliant emerald =

Species of dragonfly

The brilliant emerald, Somatochlora metallica, is a middle-sized species of dragonfly. It is the largest and greenest of the Somatochlora species; 50–55 millimetres (2.0–2.2 in) long.

S. metallica is found across most of northern Eurasia where it is the commonest of its genus. In Great Britain, it is locally common in south east England and has a very restricted population in Scotland.

The East Asian Somatochlora vera, scientifically described in 1914 by Aleksandr Bartenev based on a specimen from Ussuri, Siberia (and later also reported in northern China), is typically treated as part of S. metallica, but has also been considered a synonym of the East Asian S. exuberata.
