= Somatochlora shennong =

Conservation status
- Data Deficient (IUCN 3.1)

Scientific classification
- Kingdom: Animalia
- Phylum: Arthropoda
- Clade: Pancrustacea
- Class: Insecta
- Order: Odonata
- Infraorder: Anisoptera
- Superfamily: Libelluloidea
- Family: Corduliidae
- Genus: Somatochlora
- Species: S. shennong

Binomial name
- Somatochlora shennong Zhang, Vogt & Cai, 2014

Species of dragonfly

Somatochlora shennong is a species of dragonfly in the family Corduliidae. It was described in 2014 based on specimens from Hubei, China, and is also known from Guangxi. It occurs at narrow ditches with dense emergent vegetation. It is related to two other east Asian species: Somatochlora dido and Somatochlora taiwana.
