= Somatochlora taiwana =

Scientific classification
- Kingdom: Animalia
- Phylum: Arthropoda
- Clade: Pancrustacea
- Class: Insecta
- Order: Odonata
- Infraorder: Anisoptera
- Superfamily: Libelluloidea
- Family: Corduliidae
- Genus: Somatochlora
- Species: S. taiwana

Binomial name
- Somatochlora taiwana Inoue & Yokota, 2001
- Type locality in Hsinchu, Taiwan

Species of dragonfly

Somatochlora taiwana is a species of dragonfly in the family Corduliidae. It is endemic to Taiwan, and is the only member of the genus Somatochlora found there. It is a metallic green to black dragonfly with yellow spots, and measures about 35 mm long. It is closely related to S. shennong and S. dido, and is sometimes treated as conspecific with the latter species.

The holotype is a male that was collected near Lake Yuanyang (its probable breeding habitat) in Hsinchu at 1,670 m (5,480 ft) above sea level., and the species is known from at least one other location in Taiwan.
