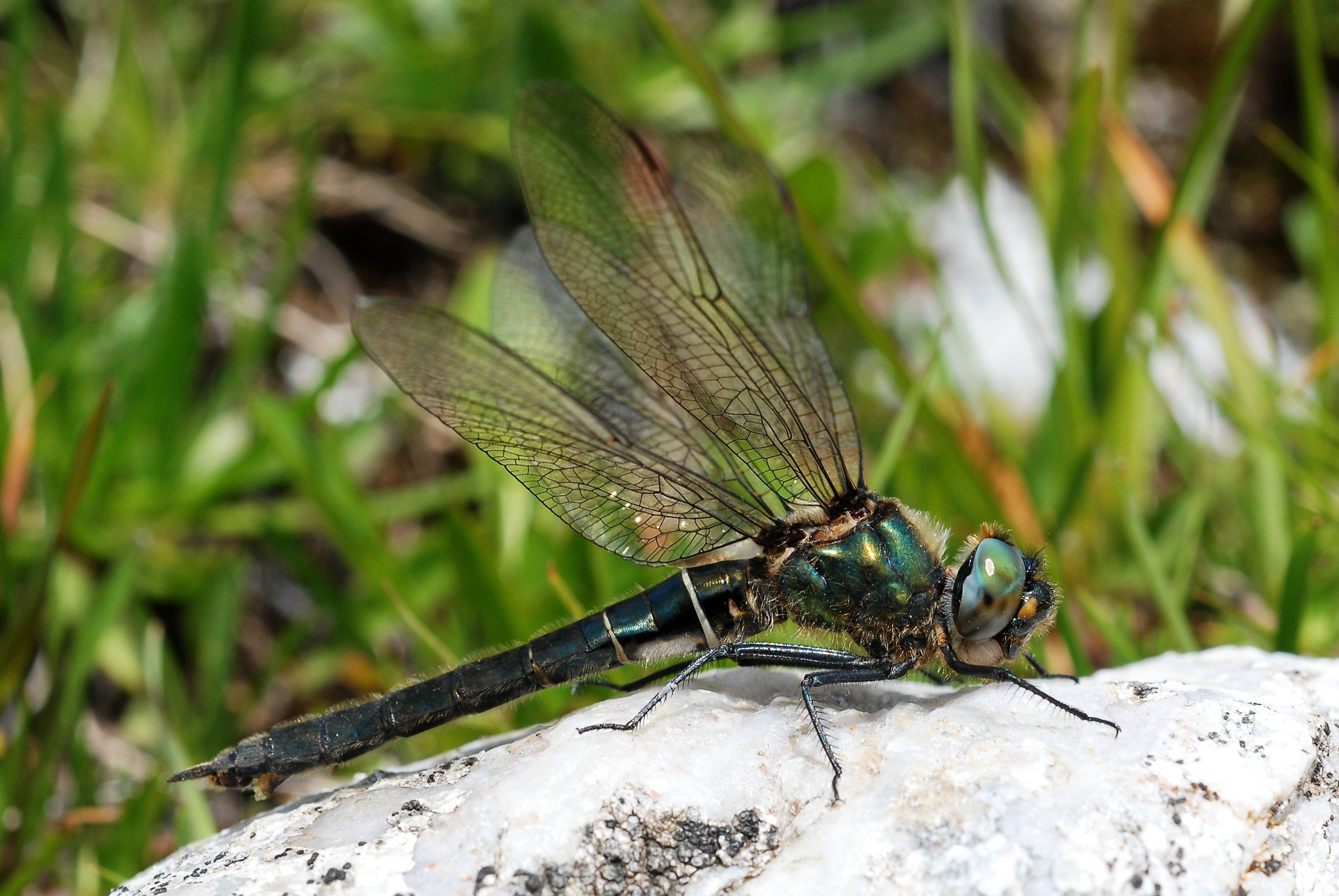
- A male in French Alps

Conservation status
- Least Concern (IUCN 3.1) Global

- Near Threatened (IUCN 3.1) Europe

Scientific classification
- Kingdom: Animalia
- Phylum: Arthropoda
- Clade: Pancrustacea
- Class: Insecta
- Order: Odonata
- Infraorder: Anisoptera
- Superfamily: Libelluloidea
- Family: Corduliidae
- Genus: Somatochlora
- Species: S. alpestris

Binomial name
- Somatochlora alpestris (Selys, 1840)

Synonyms
- Cordulia alpestris Selys, 1840

= Somatochlora alpestris =

Species of dragonfly

Somatochlora alpestris, or the alpine emerald, is a species of dragonfly from the family Corduliidae. It is found in European highlands, southern Scandinavia, and east to southern Siberia in Asia.

== Anatomy ==
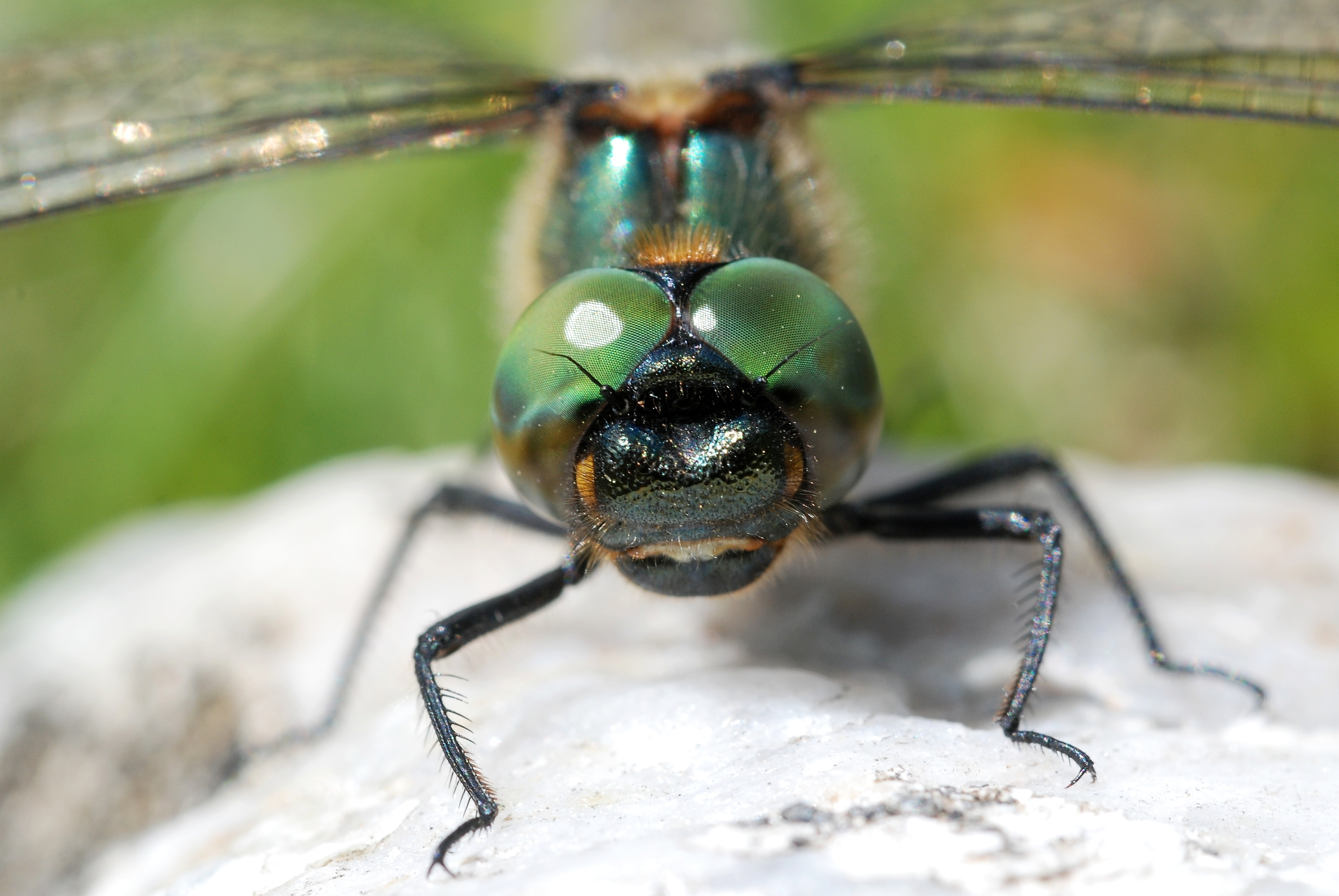
Portrait

Adults reach up to 5 cm (2.0 in) in length and appear black from the distance, but dark green metallic sheen is apparent from up close. When at rest, the characteristic narrow white band between 2nd and 3rd abdominal segments is also noticeable. Other members of the genus Somatochlora also share these characters, especially the northern emerald (S. arctica) and the treeline emerald (S. sahlbergi); although, the latter lives far north and its range doesn't overlap the alpine. The northern emerald has olive-green eyes (compared with azure in the alpine emerald) and less contrasting white band, but closer examination of anatomical characters, especially on the legs, is necessary for reliable determination.

== Habitat and distribution ==
The species inhabits cold arctic and montane areas, where it breeds in acidic bogs. The nymphs are able to survive short-term freezing and complete desiccation of their water body, while the adults are sensitive to low temperatures and snowfall in mid-summer when they are active. In Central Europe, Somatochlora alpestris is widespread in the Alps, the Tatra Mountains, and the Carpathian Mountains, roughly between 800 and 2,500 m (2,620 and 8,200 ft) a.s.l. Its Asian distribution is poorly known.
