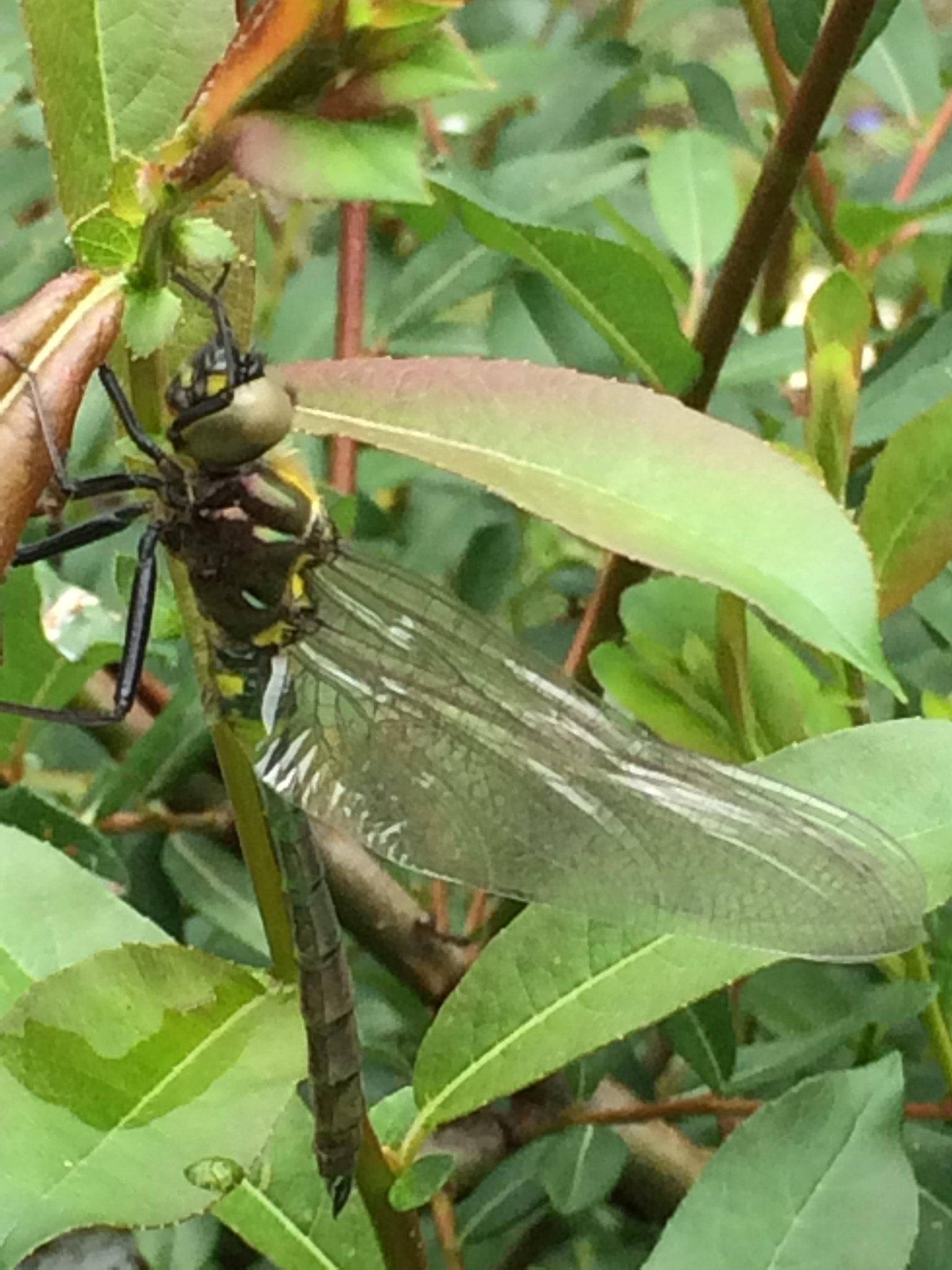

Conservation status
- Least Concern (IUCN 3.1)

Scientific classification
- Kingdom: Animalia
- Phylum: Arthropoda
- Clade: Pancrustacea
- Class: Insecta
- Order: Odonata
- Infraorder: Anisoptera
- Superfamily: Libelluloidea
- Family: Corduliidae
- Genus: Somatochlora
- Species: S. dido

Binomial name
- Somatochlora dido Needham, 1930

= Somatochlora dido =

Species of dragonfly

Somatochlora dido is a species of dragonfly in the family Corduliidae. It is known from southeastern China and northern Vietnam, but populations in Vietnam may alternatively represent a separate, undescribed, species. S. dido has sometimes been treated as synonymous with S. taiwana from Taiwan, but more recent publications have treated them as separate species. S. shennong is also closely related.

Somatochlora dido was first described by James George Needham in 1930, in A Manual of the Dragonflies of China.

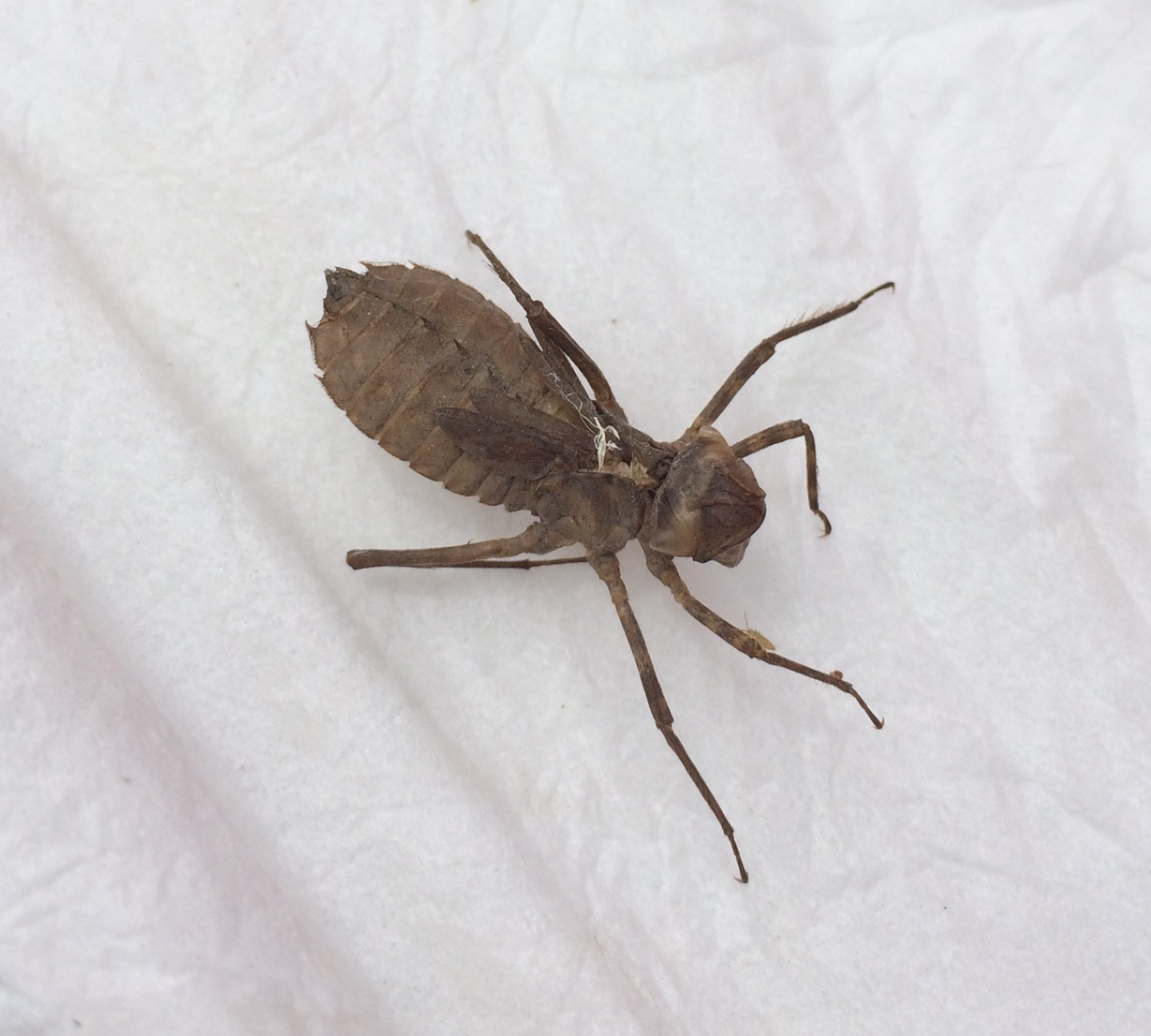
Exuvia
