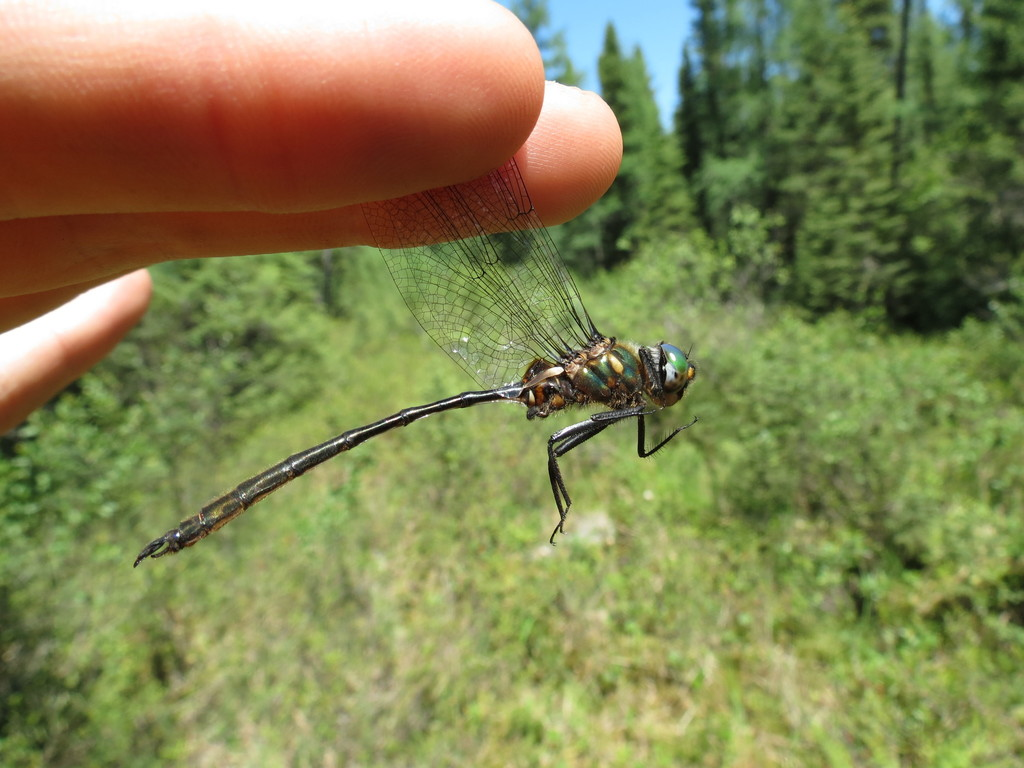

Conservation status
- Least Concern (IUCN 3.1)

Scientific classification
- Kingdom: Animalia
- Phylum: Arthropoda
- Clade: Pancrustacea
- Class: Insecta
- Order: Odonata
- Infraorder: Anisoptera
- Superfamily: Libelluloidea
- Family: Corduliidae
- Genus: Somatochlora
- Species: S. franklini

Binomial name
- Somatochlora franklini (Selys, 1878)

Synonyms
- Epitheca franklini Selys, 1878; Somatochlora macrotona Williamson, 1909

= Somatochlora franklini =

Species of dragonfly

Somatochlora franklini, the delicate emerald, is a species of emerald dragonfly in the family Corduliidae. It is found in North America.

The IUCN conservation status of Somatochlora franklini is "LC", least concern, with no immediate threat to the species' survival. The population is stable. The IUCN status was reviewed in 2017.
