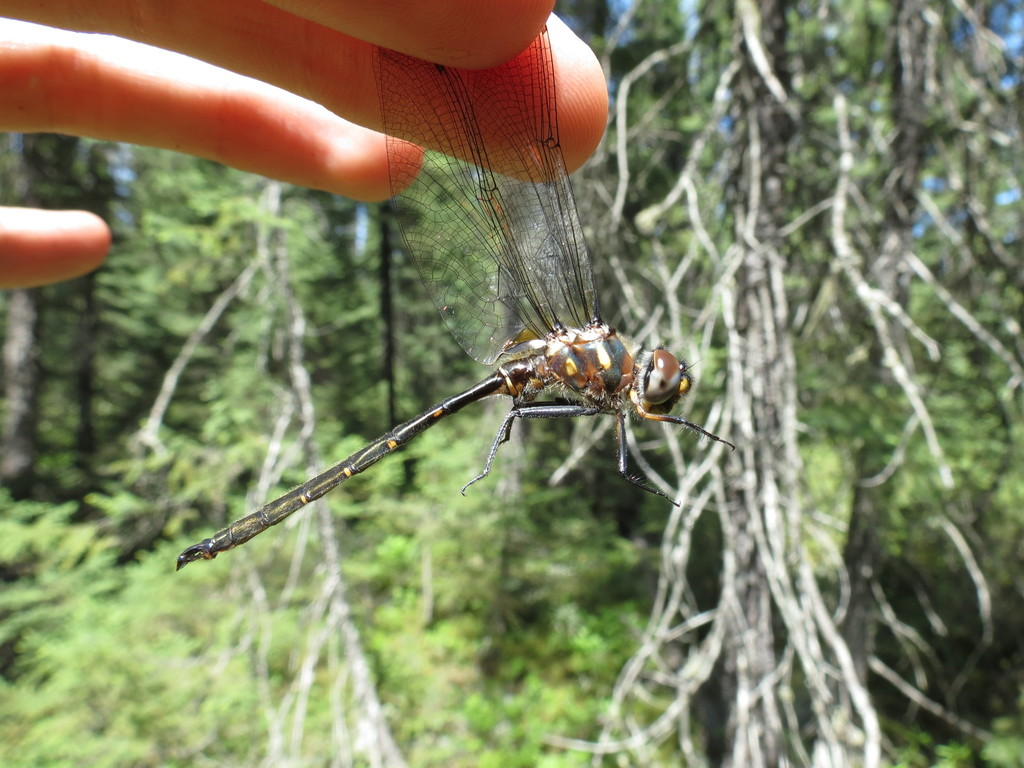

Conservation status
- Least Concern (IUCN 3.1)

Scientific classification
- Kingdom: Animalia
- Phylum: Arthropoda
- Clade: Pancrustacea
- Class: Insecta
- Order: Odonata
- Infraorder: Anisoptera
- Superfamily: Libelluloidea
- Family: Corduliidae
- Genus: Somatochlora
- Species: S. forcipata

Binomial name
- Somatochlora forcipata (Scudder, 1866)

Synonyms
- Cordulia forcipata Scudder, 1839

= Somatochlora forcipata =

Species of dragonfly

Somatochlora forcipata, the forcipate emerald, is a species of emerald dragonfly in the family Corduliidae. It is found in North America.

The IUCN conservation status of Somatochlora forcipata is "LC", least concern, with no immediate threat to the species' survival. The population is stable.
