= Aleksandr Bartenev =

Aleksandr Nikolaevich Bartenev
- Born: Aleksandr Nikolaevich Bartenev; Александр Николаевич Бартенев; 1882
- Died: 1946 (aged 63–64)
- Education: Imperial Moscow University (1907)
- Occupation: zoologist

Aleksandr Nikolaevich Bartenev (Russian: Александр Николаевич Бартенев; 1882–1946) was a zoologist, professor, Doctor of Biological Sciences, and Rector of Rostov University in 1920–1921. He was active in the Russian Empire and later the Soviet Union.

== Biography ==
Aleksandr Nikolaevich Bartenev was born in 1882. He graduated from the Imperial University of Moscow in 1907. In 1911 he became a Professor at the Department of Zoology of the Imperial University of Warsaw (and after the evacuation of the University in Rostov-on-Don in 1915, became the base of Rostov University, where Bartenev worked until 1930. He was Rector of Rostov University in 1920–1921. In 1934–1936 and in 1939–1945 he also was the head of the Department of Zoology at the Kazakh State University in Almaty and one of the founders of this University.

For 40 years (since 1907) of his scientific work Bartenev had published 83 works on fauna, taxonomy, ecology and geographical distribution of Odonata. Among his most remarkable works are "Notes on the Dragonflies of the Zoological Department of the Museum of Ural Society of Naturalists" (1909), "Materials on the fauna of dragonflies of Siberia" (1914), "Notes on the Dragonflies of the Caucasus" (1928), "Materials for the Knowledge of the Western Caucasus in odontological relation" (1930), "Notes on the collection of dragonflies of the North Caucasian hydrobiological station in 1928 in Kabardino-Balkaria" (1930). He described about 80 species and subspecies of Odonata of which only about 18 are now considered valid.

Bartenev was a Doctor of Biological Sciences and an academician of the Academy of Sciences of the Kazakh SSR.
