= Pursuit predation =

Hunting strategy by some predators

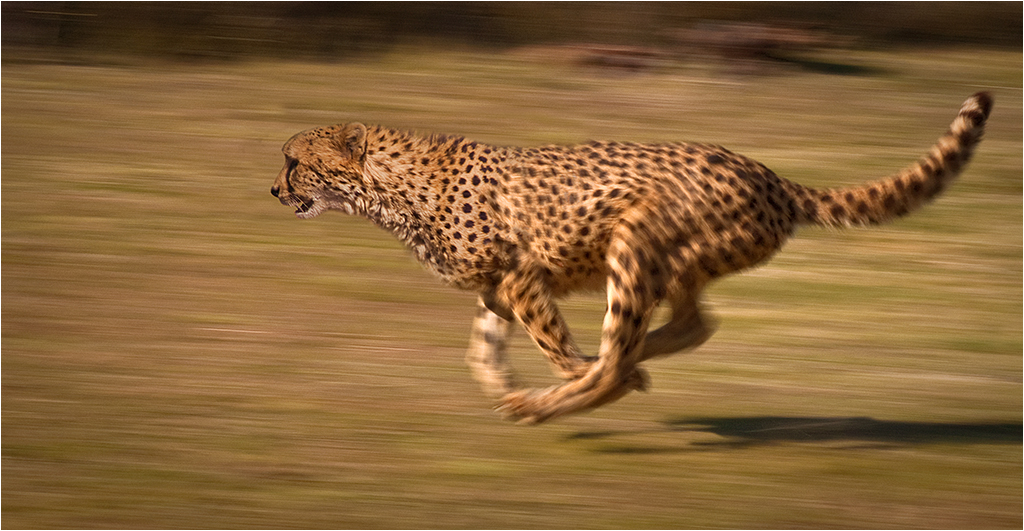
A cheetah exhibiting pursuit predation

Pursuit predation is a form of predation in which predators actively give chase to their prey, either solitarily or as a group. It is an alternate predation strategy to ambush predation — pursuit predators rely on superior speed, endurance and/or teamwork to seize the prey, while ambush predators use concealment, luring, exploiting of surroundings and the element of surprise to capture the prey. While the two patterns of predation are not mutually exclusive, morphological differences in an organism's body plan can create an evolutionary bias favoring either type of predation.

Pursuit predation is typically observed in carnivorous species within the kingdom Animalia, such as cheetahs, lions, wolves and early Homo species. The chase can be initiated either by the predator, or by the prey if it is alerted to a predator's presence and attempt to flee before the predator gets close. The chase ends either when the predator successfully catches up and tackles the prey, or when the predator abandons the attempt after the prey outruns it and escapes.

One particular form of pursuit predation is persistence hunting, where the predator stalks the prey slowly but persistently to wear it down physically with fatigue or overheating; some animals are examples of both types of pursuit.

== Strategy ==
There is still uncertainty as to whether predators behave with a general tactic or strategy while preying. However, among pursuit predators there are several common behaviors. Often, predators will scout potential prey, assessing prey quantity and density prior to engaging in a pursuit. Certain predators choose to pursue prey primarily in a group of conspecifics; these animals are known as pack hunters or group pursuers. Other species choose to hunt alone. These two behaviors are typically due to differences in hunting success, where some groups are very successful in groups and others are more successful alone. Pursuit predators may also choose to either exhaust their metabolic resources rapidly or pace themselves during a chase. This choice can be influenced by prey species, seasonal settings, or temporal settings. Predators that rapidly exhaust their metabolic resources during a chase tend to first stalk their prey, slowly approaching their prey to decrease chase distance and time. When the predator is at a closer distance (one that would lead to easier prey capture), it finally gives chase. Pacing pursuit is more commonly seen in group pursuit, as individual animals do not need to exert as much energy to capture prey. However, this type of pursuit requires group coordination, which may have varying degrees of success. Since groups can engage in longer chases, they often focus on separating a weaker or slower prey item during pursuit. Morphologically speaking, while ambush predation requires stealth, pursuit predation requires speed; pursuit predators are proportionally long-limbed and equipped with cursorial adaptations. Current theories suggest that this proportionally long-limbed approach to body plan was an evolutionary countermeasure to prey adaptation.

== Group pursuers ==
=== Vertebrates ===
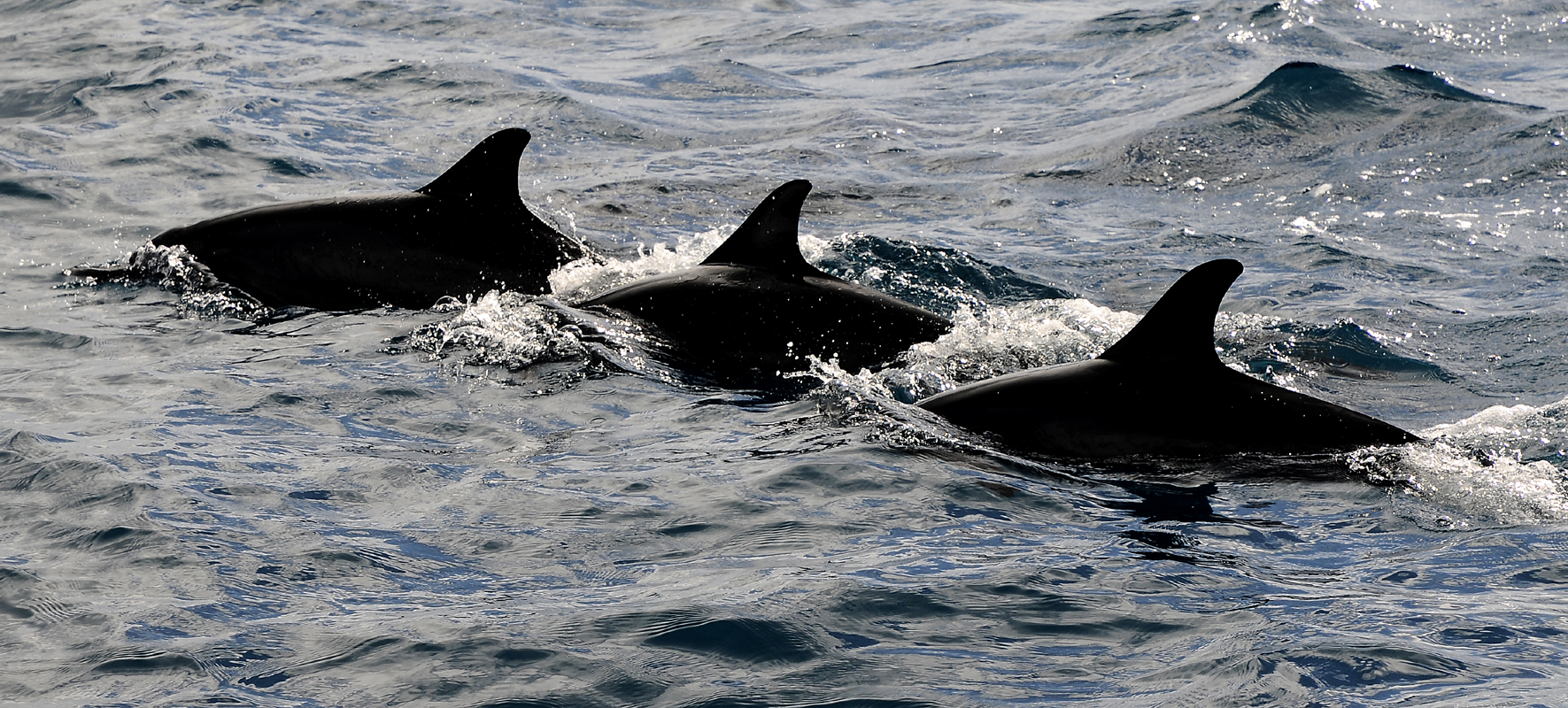
A small pod of dolphins

Group pursuers hunt with a collection of conspecifics. Group pursuit is usually seen in species of relatively high sociality; in vertebrates, individuals often seem to have defined roles in pursuit.

==== Mammals ====
African wild dog (Lycaon pictus) packs have been known to split into several smaller groups while in pursuit; one group initiates the chase, while the other travels ahead of the prey's escape path. The group of chase initiators coordinate their chase to lead the prey towards the location of the second group, where the prey's escape path will be effectively cut off.

Bottlenose dolphins (Tursiops) have been shown exhibiting similar behaviors of pursuit role specialization. One group within the dolphin pod, known as the drivers, give chase to the fish - forcing the fish into a tight circle formation, while the other group of the pod, the barriers, approach the fish from the opposite direction. This two-pronged attack leaves the fish with only the option of jumping out of the water to escape the dolphins. However, the fish are completely vulnerable in the air; it is at this point when the dolphins leap out and catch the fish.

In lion (Panthera leo) pack hunting, each member of the hunting group is assigned a position, from left wing to right wing, in order to better obtain prey. Such specializations in roles within the group are thought to increase sophistication in technique; lion wing members are faster, and will drive prey toward the center where the larger, stronger, killing members of the pride will take down the prey. Many observations of group pursuers note an optimal hunting size in which certain currencies (mass of prey killed or number of prey killed) are maximized with respect to costs (kilometers covered or injuries sustained). Groups size is often dependent on aspects of the environment: number of prey, prey density, number of competitors, seasonal changes, etc.

==== Birds ====
While birds are generally believed to be individual hunters, there are a few examples of birds that cooperate during pursuits. Harris's hawks (Parabuteo unicinctus) have two cooperative strategies for hunting: Surrounding and cover penetration, and long chase relay attack.

The first strategy involves a group of hawks surrounding prey hidden under some form of cover, while another hawk attempts to penetrate the prey's cover. The penetration attempt flushes the prey out from its cover where it is swiftly killed by one of the surrounding hawks.

The second strategy is less commonly used: It involves a "relay attack" in which a group of hawks, led by a "lead" hawk, engage in a long chase for prey. The "lead" hawk will dive in order to kill the prey. If the dive is unsuccessful, the role of the "lead" shifts to another hawk who will then dive in another attempt to kill the prey. During one observed relay attack, 20 dives and hence 20 lead switches were exhibited.

=== Invertebrates ===
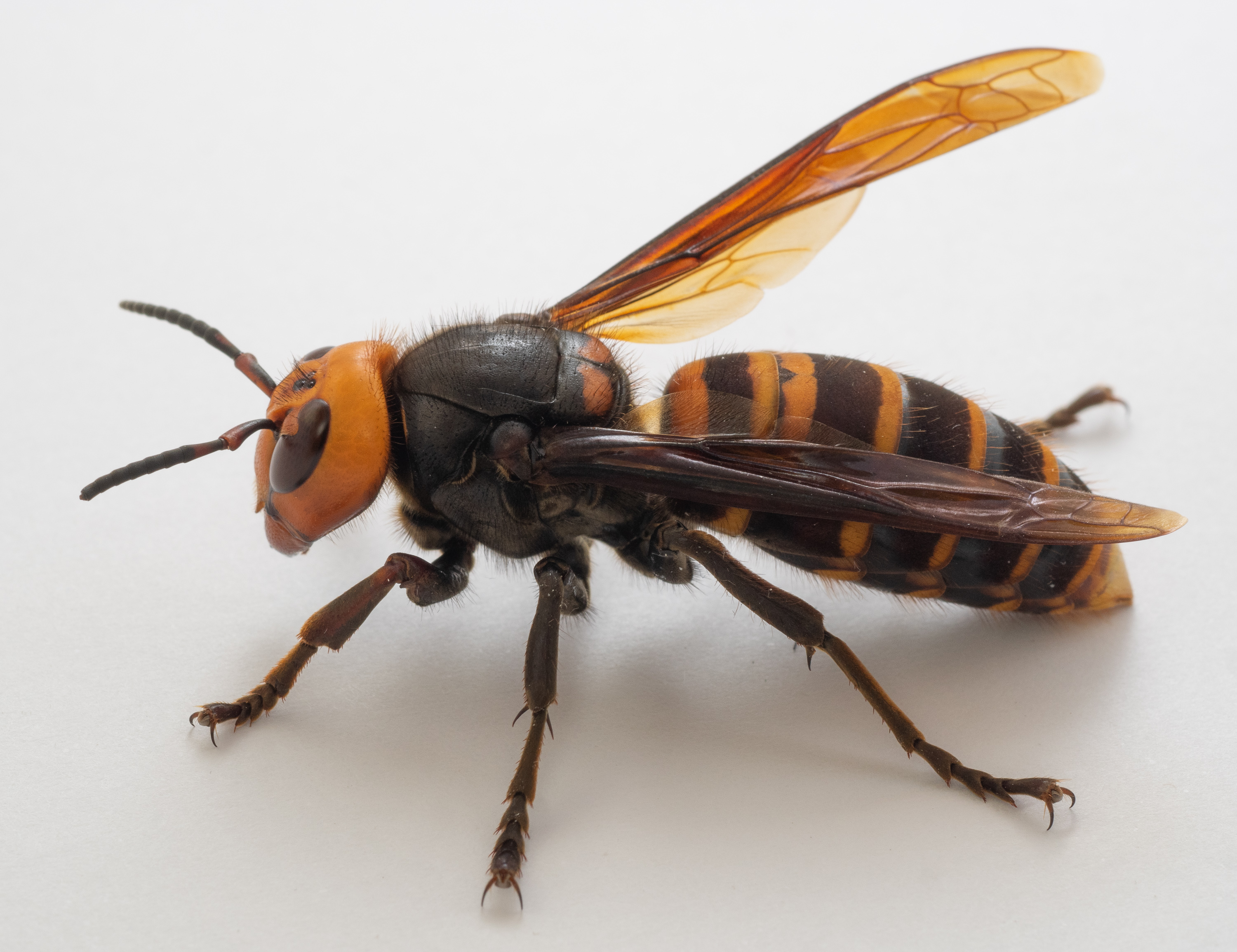
Asian Giant Hornet (Vespa mandarinia)

As in vertebrates, there are many species of invertebrates which actively pursue prey in groups and exhibit task specialization, but while the vertebrates change their behavior based on their role in hunting, invertebrate task delegation is usually based on actual morphological differences. The vast majority of eusocial insects have castes within a population which tend to differ in size and have specialized structures for different tasks. This differentiation is taken to the extreme in the groups isoptera and hymenoptera, or termites and ants, bees, and wasps respectively.

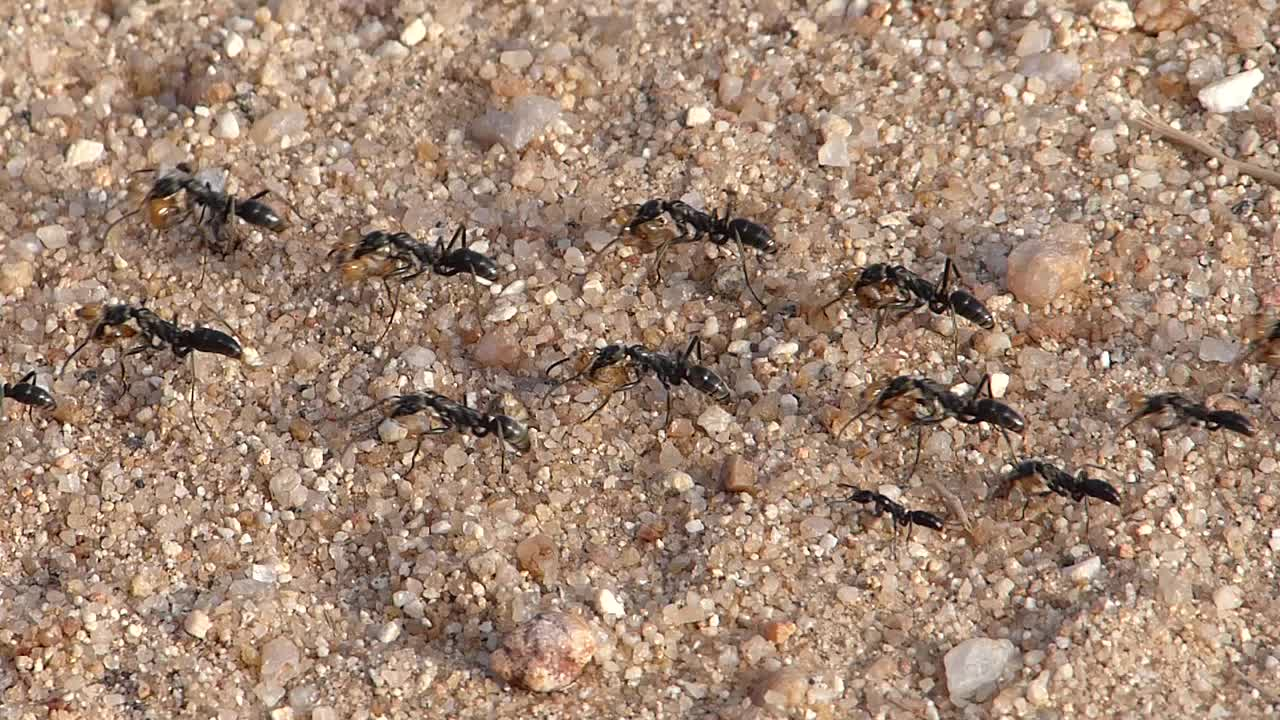
Matabele Ants (Pachycondyla sp.) carrying dead termites

Termite-hunting ants of the genus Pachycondyla, also known as Matabele ants, form raiding parties consisting of ants of different castes, such as soldier ants and worker ants. Soldier ants are much larger than worker ants, with more powerful mandibles and more robust exoskeletons, and so they make up the front lines of raiding parties and are responsible for killing prey. Workers usually butcher and carry off the killed prey, while supporting the soldiers. The raiding parties are highly mobile and move aggressively into the colonies of termites, often breaking through their outer defenses and entering their mounds. The ants do not completely empty the mound of termites, instead they only take a few, allowing the termites to recover their numbers so that the ants have a steady stream of prey.

Asian giant hornets, Vespa mandarinia, form similar raiding parties to hunt their prey, which usually consists of honeybees. The giant hornets group together and as a team can decimate an entire honeybee colony, especially those of non-native European honeybees. Alone, the hornets are subject to attack by the smaller bees, who swarm the hornet and vibrate their abdomens to generate heat, collectively cooking the hornet until it dies. By hunting in groups, the hornets avoid this problem.

== Individual pursuers ==
=== Vertebrates ===
==== Mammals ====
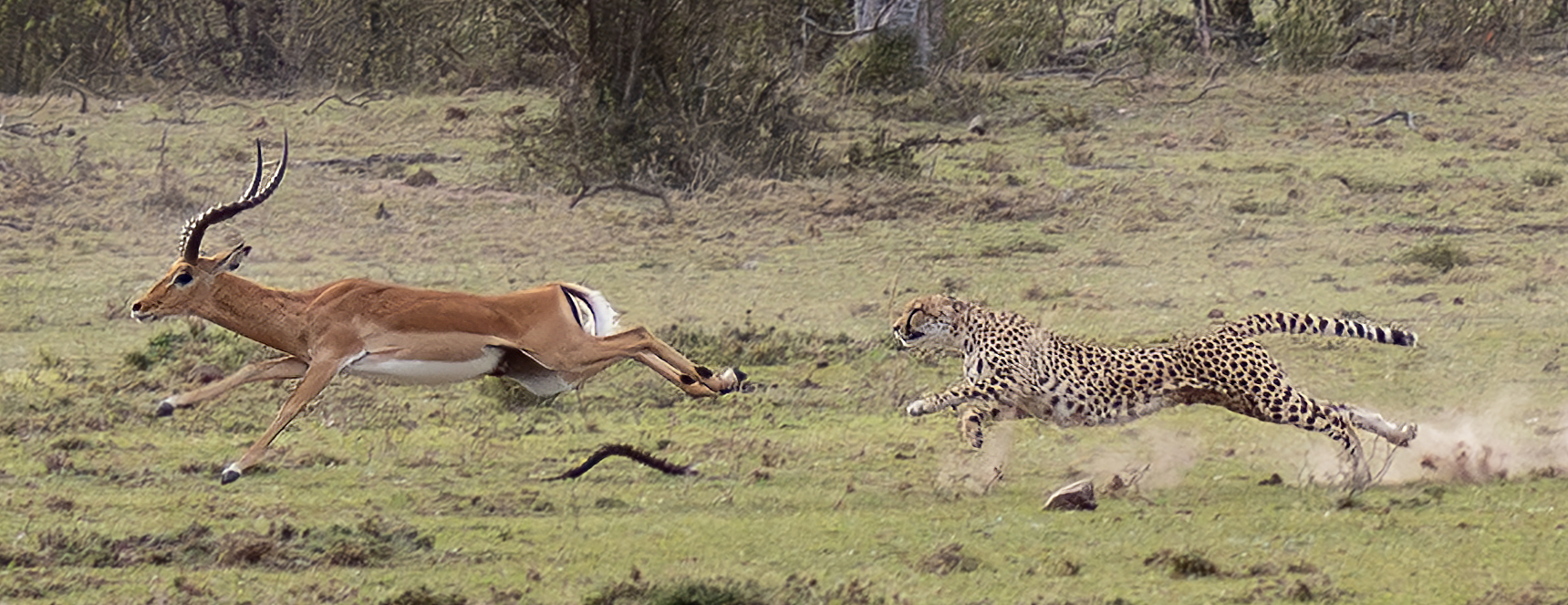
Cheetah chasing impala

While most big cat species are either solitary or grupal ambush predators, cheetahs (Acinonyx jubatus) are principally solitary pursuit predators. Widely known as the fastest terrestrial animal, reaches 104 km/h (65 mph) and passes from 0 to more than 97 km/h (60 mph) in less of 3 seconds, taking advantage of their speed during hunting. However, its speed and acceleration can only be sustained for short periods of time, due to lower mitochondria volume to muscle fiber volume percentage compared to dogs and ponies. Cheetahs can maintain a chase with prey for a mean of 37.9 seconds. It will try to strike down its prey in full pursuit hooking it with its sharp dewclaws; once the prey has fallen over, the cheetah will pounce and try to subdue it with a throat bite.

There are claims that the key to cheetahs' pursuit being successful may not be just burst of sheer speed. Cheetahs are extremely agile, able to change directions in very short amounts of time while running at very high speeds. This maneuverability can make up for unsustainable high-speed pursuits, as it allows a cheetah to quickly close the distance without having to decelerate when the prey suddenly changes direction.

The cheetah has a muscular arrangement that is better suited to chasing fast prey than other cats, which gives their forelimbs its distinctive long and slender appearance. On the one hand, the main muscles responsible for retracting the shoulders and extending the shoulders and elbows of the forelimbs during running, are more developed in cheetahs than in other cats. The latissimus dorsi and pectoralis profundus, shoulder retractors, together account for 23.9% of the total muscle mass of the forelimbs in cheetahs, while in other cat species they account for 14–21.1%. The long head of the triceps brachii, the most important elbow extensor, accounts for 10.5% of the total forelimb muscle mass in cheetahs, while in other cats it accounts for 6.6–9.2%. The infraspinatus and supraspinatus, shoulder extensors, together accounts for 11.3% of total forelimb muscle mass in cheetahs, while in other cat species it accounts for 7.8–11.1%.

On the other hand, the main muscles responsible for enabling the predator to climb onto its prey or pull it down are smaller in cheetahs than in other cats. The flexor digitorum profundus, the muscle that gives strength to the cat claws, accounts for 2.6% of the total forelimb muscle mass in cheetahs, while in other cat species it accounts for 3.2–4.9%. The biceps brachii, brachialis, brachioradialis, pronator teres and supinator, elbow flexors, together account for 4.1% of the total forelimb muscle mass in cheetahs, while in other cat species they account for 5.1–7.4%.

==== Birds ====
The Painted redstart (Myioborus pictus) is one of the most well documented flush pursuers. When flies, prey for redstarts, are alerted of the presence of predators, they respond by fleeing. Redstarts take advantage of this anti-predator response by spreading and orienting their easily noticeable wings and tails, alerting the flies, but only when they are in a position where the flies' escape path intersects with the redstart's central field of vision. When prey's path are in this field of vision, the redstart's prey capture rate is at its maximum. Once the flies begin to flee, the redstart begins to chase. It has been proposed that redstarts exploit two aspects of the visual sensitivity of their prey: sensitivity to the location of the stimulus in the prey's visual field and sensitivity to the direction of stimulus environment. The effectiveness of this pursuit can also be explained by "rare enemy effect", an evolutionary consequence of multi-species predator-prey interactions.

=== Invertebrates ===
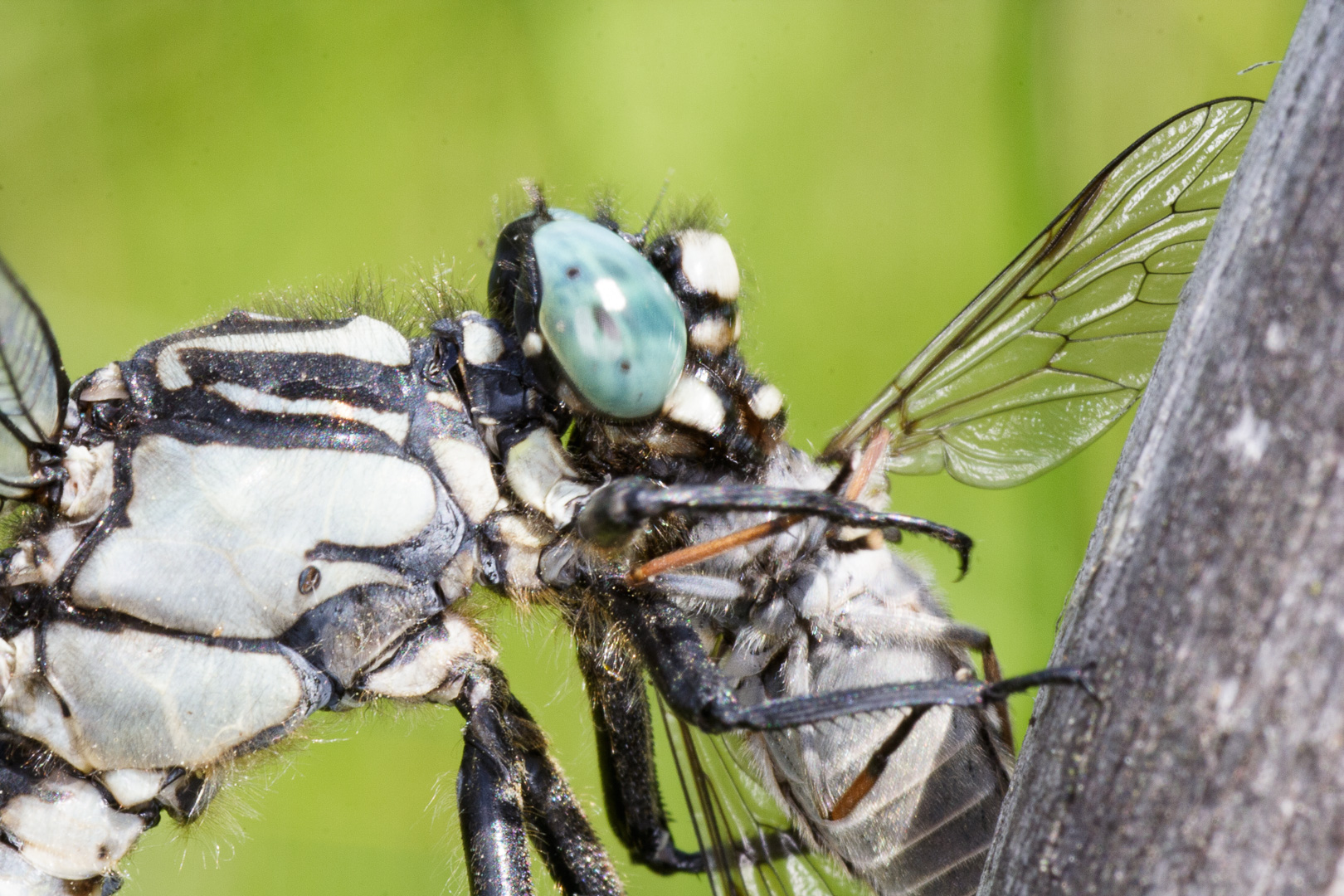
Dragonfly with prey

Dragonflies are skilled aerial pursuers; they have a 97% success rate for prey capture. This success rate is a consequence of the "decision" on which prey to pursue, based on initial conditions. Observations of several species of perching dragonflies show more pursuit initiations at larger starting distances for larger size prey species than for much smaller prey. Further evidence points to a potential bias towards larger prey, due to more substantial metabolic rewards. This bias is in spite of the fact that larger prey are typically faster and choosing them results in less successful pursuits. Dragonflies high success rate for prey capture may also be due to their interception foraging method. Unlike classical pursuit, in which the predator aims for the current position of their prey, dragonflies predict the prey's direction of motion, as in parallel navigation. Perching dragonflies (Libellulidae family), have been observed "staking out" high density prey spots prior to pursuit. There are no noticeable distinctions in prey capture efficiency between males and females. Further, percher dragonflies are bound by their visual range. They are more likely to engage in pursuit when prey come within a subtended angle of around 1-2 degrees. Angles greater than this are outside of a dragonflies visual range.

== Evolutionary basis of the behavior ==
=== Evolution as a countermeasure ===
Current theory on the evolution of pursuit predation suggests that the behavior is an evolutionary countermeasure to prey adaptation. Prey animals vary in their likelihood to avoid predation, and it is predation failure that drives evolution of both prey and predator. Predation failure rates vary wildly across the animal kingdom; raptorial birds can fail anywhere from 20% to 80% of the time in predation, while predatory mammals usually fail more than half the time. Prey adaptation drives these low rates in three phases: the detection phase, the pursuit phase, and the resistance phase. The pursuit phase drove the evolution of distinct behaviors for pursuit predation.

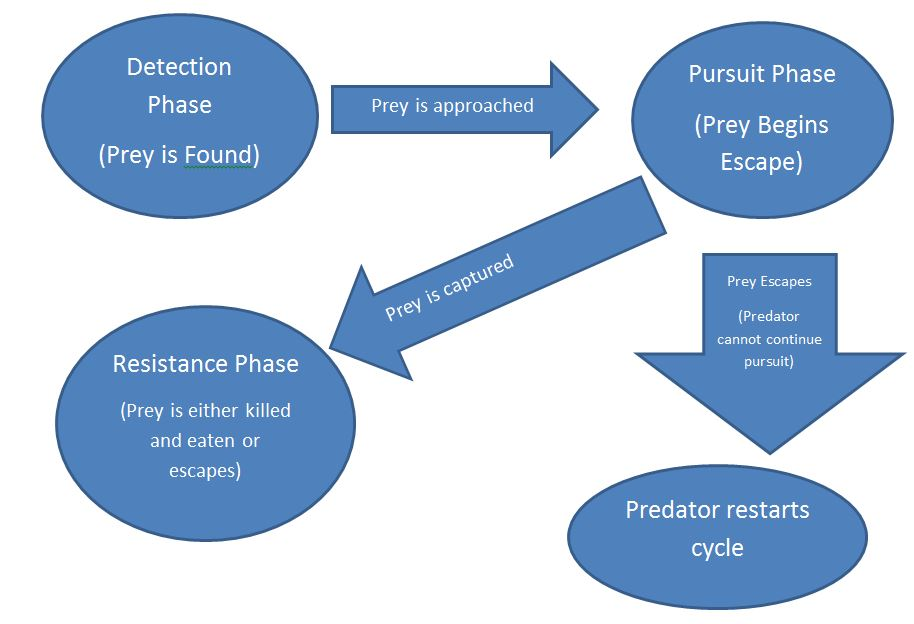
Phases of Pursuit Predation

As selective pressure on prey is higher than on predators adaptation usually occurs in prey long before the reciprocal adaptations in predators. Evidence in the fossil record supports this, with no evidence of modern pursuit predators until the late Tertiary period. Certain adaptations, like long limbs in ungulates, that were thought to be adaptive for speed against predatory behavior have been found to predate predatory animals by over 20 million years. Because of this, modern pursuit predation is an adaptation that may have evolved separately and much later as a need for more energy in colder and more arid climates. Longer limbs in predators, the key morphological adaptation required for lengthy pursuit of prey, is tied in the fossil record to the late Tertiary. It is now believed that modern pursuit predators like the wolf and lion evolved this behavior around this time period as a response to ungulates increasing feeding range. As ungulate prey moved into a wider feeding range to discover food in response to changing climate, predators evolved the longer limbs and behavior necessary to pursue prey across larger ranges. In this respect, pursuit predation is not co-evolutionary with prey adaptation, but a direct response to prey. Prey's adaptation to climate is the key formative reason for evolving the behavior and morphological necessities of pursuit predation.

In addition to serving as a countermeasure to prey adaptation, pursuit predation has evolved in some species as an alternative, facultative mechanism for foraging. For example, polar bears typically act as specialized predators of seal pups and operate in a manner closely predicted by the optimal foraging theory. However, they have been seen to occasionally employ more energy-inefficient pursuit predation tactics on flightless geese. This alternative predatory strategy may serve as a back-up resource when optimal foraging is circumstantially impossible, or may even be a function of filling dietary needs.

=== Evolution from an ecological basis ===
Pursuit predation revolves around a distinct movement interaction between predator and prey; as prey move to find new foraging areas, predators should move with them. Predators congregate in areas of high prey density, and prey should therefore avoid these areas. However, dilution factor may be a reason to stay in areas of high density due to a decreased risk of predation. Given the movements of predators over ranges in pursuit predation, though, dilution factor seems a less important cause for predation avoidance. Because of these interactions, spatial patterns of predators and prey are important in preserving population size. Attempts by prey to avoid predation and find food are coupled with predator attempts to hunt and compete with other predators. These interactions act to preserve populations. Models of spatial patterns and synchrony of predator-prey relationships can be used as support for the evolution of pursuit predation as one mechanism to preserve these population mechanics. By pursuing prey over long distances, predators actually improve longterm survival of both their own population and prey population through population synchrony. Pursuit predation acts to even out population fluctuations by moving predatory animals from areas of high predator density to low predator density, and low prey density to high prey density. This keeps migratory populations in synchrony, which increases metapopulation persistence. Pursuit predation's effect on population persistence is more marked over larger travel ranges. Predator and prey levels are usually more synchronous in predation over larger ranges, as population densities have more ability to even out. Pursuit predation can then be supported as an adaptive mechanism for not just individual feeding success but also metapopulation persistence.

== Anti-predator adaptation to pursuit predation ==
=== Anti-predator adaptation ===
Just as the evolutionary arms race has led to the development of pursuit behavior of predators, so too has it led to the anti-predator adaptations of prey. Alarm displays such as eastern swamphen's tail flicking, white-tailed deer's tail flagging, and Thomson's gazelles' stotting have been observed deterring pursuit. These tactic are believed to signal that a predator's presence is known and, therefore, pursuit will be much more difficult. These displays are more frequent when predators are at an intermediate distance away. Alarm displays are used more often when prey believe predators are more prone to change their decision to pursue. For instance, cheetahs, common predators of Thomson's gazelles, are less likely to change their choice to pursue. As such, gazelles stot less when cheetahs are present than when other predators are present. In addition to behavioral adaptations, there are also morphological anti-predator adaptations to pursuit predators. For example, many birds have evolved rump feathers that fall off with much less force than the feathers of their other body parts. This allows for easier escape from predator birds, as avian predators often approach prey from their rump.

=== The confusion effect ===
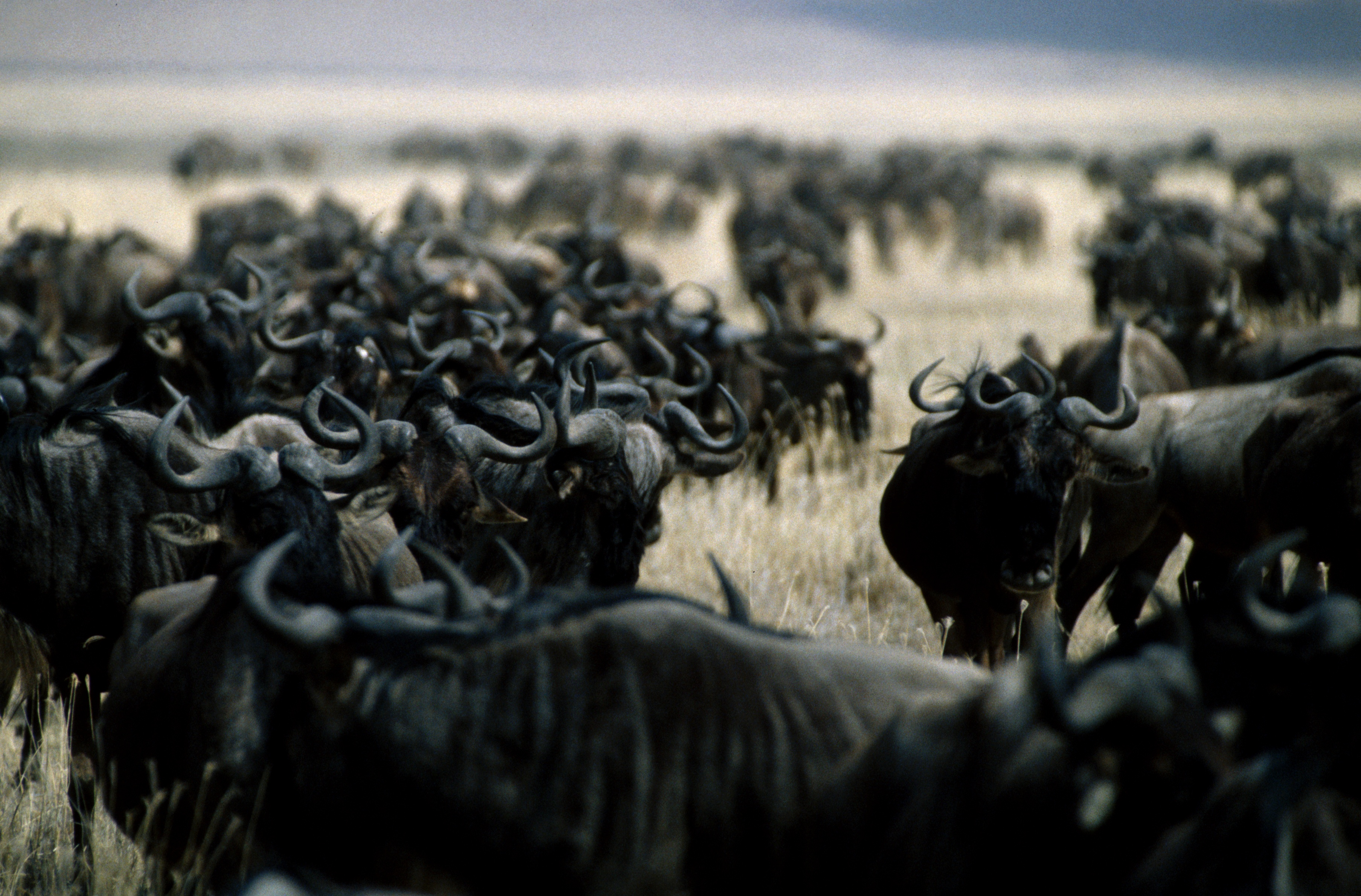
Wildebeest in a herd, showing little differentiation between individuals (low oddity)

In many species that fall prey to pursuit predation, gregariousness on a massive scale has evolved as a protective behavior. Such herds can be conspecific (all individuals are of one species) or heterospecific. This is primarily due to the confusion effect, which states that if prey animals congregate in large groups, predators will have more difficulty identifying and tracking specific individuals. This effect has greater influence when individuals are visually similar and less distinguishable. In groups where individuals are visually similar, there is a negative correlation between group size and predator success rates. This may mean that the overall number of attacks decreases with larger group size or that the number of attacks per kill increases with larger group size. This is especially true in open habitats, such as grasslands or open ocean ecosystems, where view of the prey group is unobstructed, in contrast to a forest or reef. Prey species in these open environments tend to be especially gregarious, with notable examples being starlings and sardines. When individuals of the herd are visually dissimilar, however, the success rate of predators increases dramatically. In one study, wildebeest on the African Savannah were selected at random and had their horns painted white. This introduced a distinction, or oddity, into the population; researchers found that the wildebeest with white horns were preyed upon at substantially higher rates. By standing out, individuals are not as easily lost in the crowd, and so predators are able to track and pursue them with higher fidelity. This has been proposed as the reason why many schooling fish show little to no sexual dimorphism, and why many species in heterospecific schools bear a close resemblance to other species in their school.
