= Motion camouflage =

Camouflage by choosing path to avoid seeming to move against background

Principle of motion camouflage by mimicking the optic flow of the background. An attacker flies towards a target, choosing its path so that it remains on a line between target and a real point behind the attacker; this path differs from classical pursuit, and is often shorter (as illustrated here). The attacker looms larger as it closes on target, but does not otherwise appear to move.

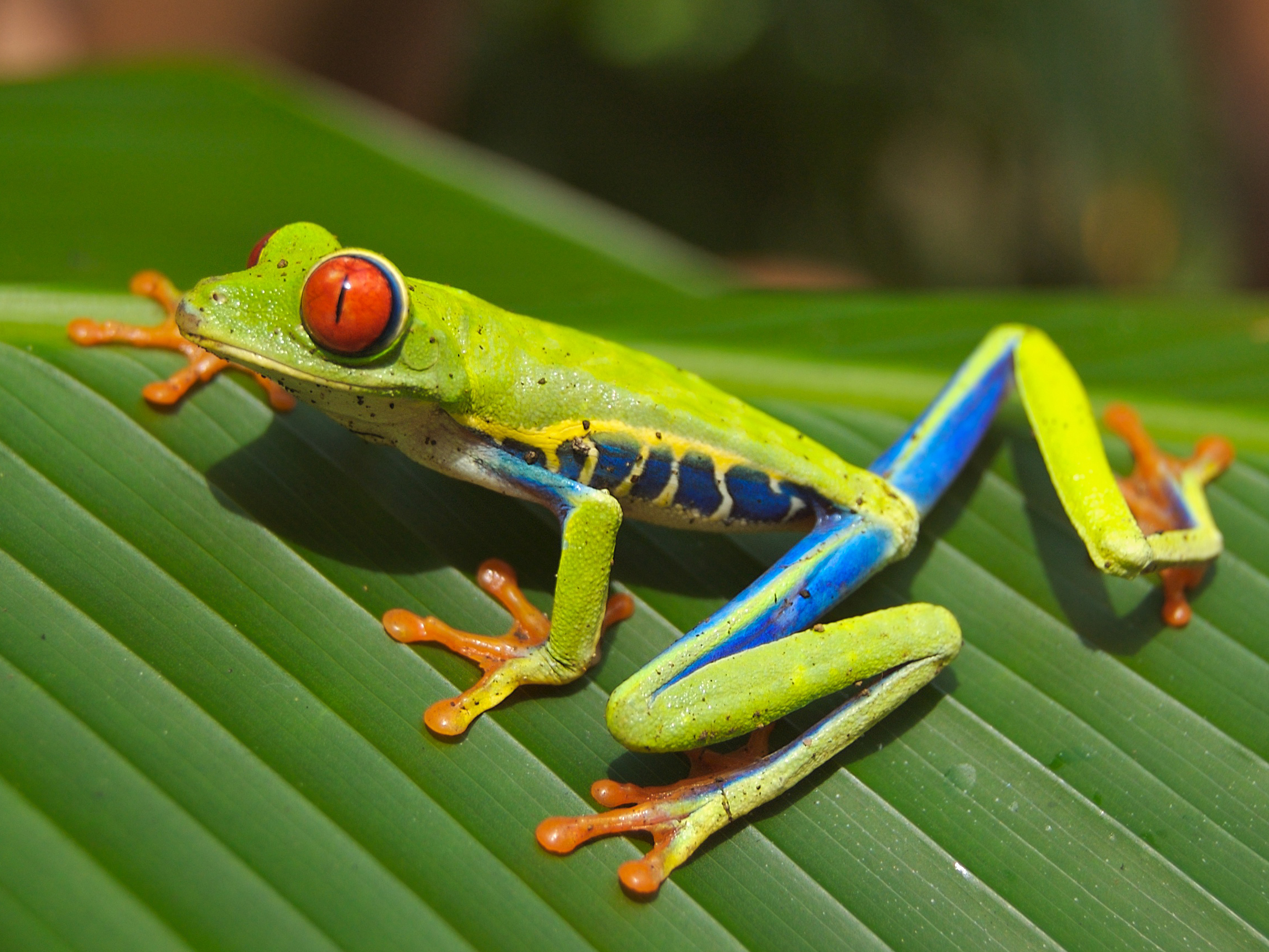
Animals such as frogs are very good at detecting motion, making motion camouflage a priority for predators.

Motion camouflage is camouflage which provides a degree of concealment for a moving object, given that motion makes objects easy to detect however well their coloration matches their background or breaks up their outlines.

The principal form of motion camouflage, and the type generally meant by the term, involves an attacker's mimicking the optic flow of the background as seen by its target. This enables the attacker to approach the target while appearing to remain stationary from the target's perspective, unlike in classical pursuit (where the attacker moves straight towards the target at all times, and often appears to the target to move sideways). The attacker chooses its flight path so as to remain on the line between the target and some landmark point. The target therefore does not see the attacker move from the landmark point. The only visible evidence that the attacker is moving is its looming, the change in size as the attacker approaches.

Camouflage is sometimes facilitated by motion, as in the leafy sea dragon and some stick insects. These animals complement their passive camouflage by swaying like plants in the wind or ocean currents, delaying their recognition by predators.

First discovered in hoverflies in 1995, motion camouflage by minimizing optic flow has been demonstrated in another insect order, dragonflies, as well as in two groups of vertebrates, falcons and echolocating bats. Since bats hunt at night, they cannot use camouflage. Instead they use an efficient homing strategy called constant absolute target direction. It has been suggested that anti-aircraft missiles could benefit from similar techniques.

== Camouflage of approach motion ==
Many animals are highly sensitive to motion; for example, frogs readily detect small moving dark spots but ignore stationary ones. Therefore, motion signals can be used to defeat camouflage. Moving objects with disruptive camouflage patterns remain harder to identify than uncamouflaged objects, especially if other similar objects are nearby, even though they are detected, so motion does not completely 'break' camouflage. All the same, the conspicuousness of motion raises the question of whether and how motion itself could be camouflaged. Several mechanisms are possible.

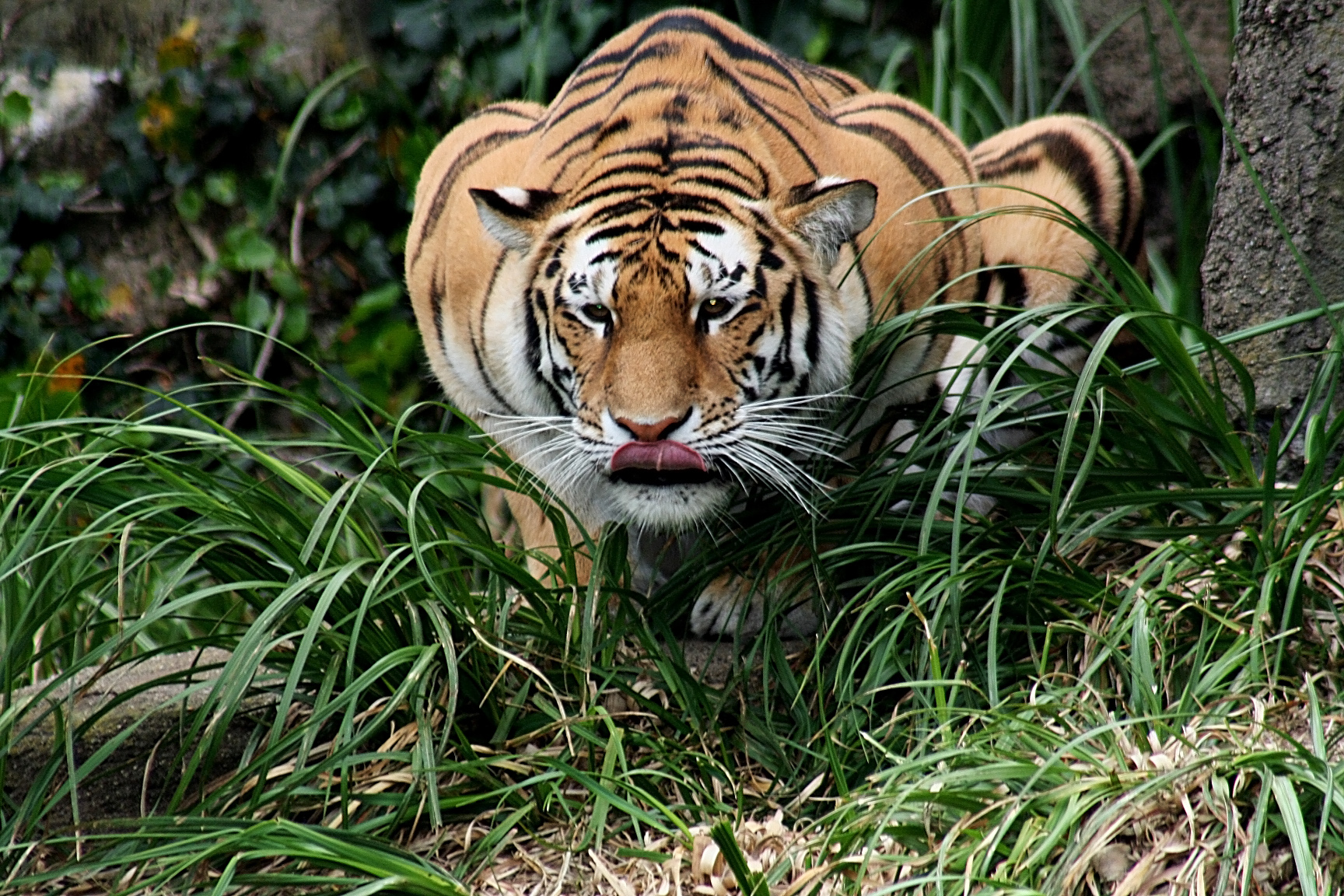
Predators such as tigers stalk prey very slowly, to minimise motion cues.

=== Stealthy movements ===
One strategy is to minimise actual motion, as when predators such as tigers stalk prey by moving very slowly and stealthily. This strategy effectively avoids the need to camouflage motion.

=== Minimising motion signal ===
When movement is required, one strategy is to minimise the motion signal, for example by avoiding waving limbs about and by choosing patterns that do not cause flicker when seen by the prey from straight ahead. Cuttlefish may be doing this with their active camouflage by choosing to form stripes at right angles to their front-back axis, minimising motion signals that would be given by occluding and displaying the pattern as they swim.

=== Disrupting perception of motion ===
Head-on view of broadback cuttlefish in motion camouflage hunting pose. The predator creates a "passing-stripe" pattern on its front, with two of its arms outstretched, reducing its appearance of looming larger as it approaches its crab prey.

Disrupting the attacker's perception of the target's motion was one of the intended purposes of dazzle camouflage as used on ships in the First World War, though its effectiveness is disputed.

Broadback cuttlefish, Ascarosepion latimanus, hunt prey such as shore crabs, Carcinus maenas, by swimming directly towards them, making a "passing-stripe" display on their front. The cuttlefish colours its head white and forms six out of eight of its arms into a forward-pointing cone. The other two arms are stretched out sideways, their broad sides facing the prey. The display consists of moving dark stripes downwards over the forward-facing parts of the head and arms. The crab sees the image of the predator looming larger as it approaches; on its own, this elicits a strong reaction from the crab. Crabs presented with a combination of looming with a passing-stripe display reacted less strongly. The cuttlefish's posture helps to mask movements of its mantle (behind the outstretched arms), perhaps further reducing motion cues to the crab. If the crab is using radial motion from looming to detect attack, then the passing-stripe display deceives the crab by reducing that cue. Instead, it offers a wide horizontal body shape with vertical stripe movements.

=== Mimicking optic flow of background ===
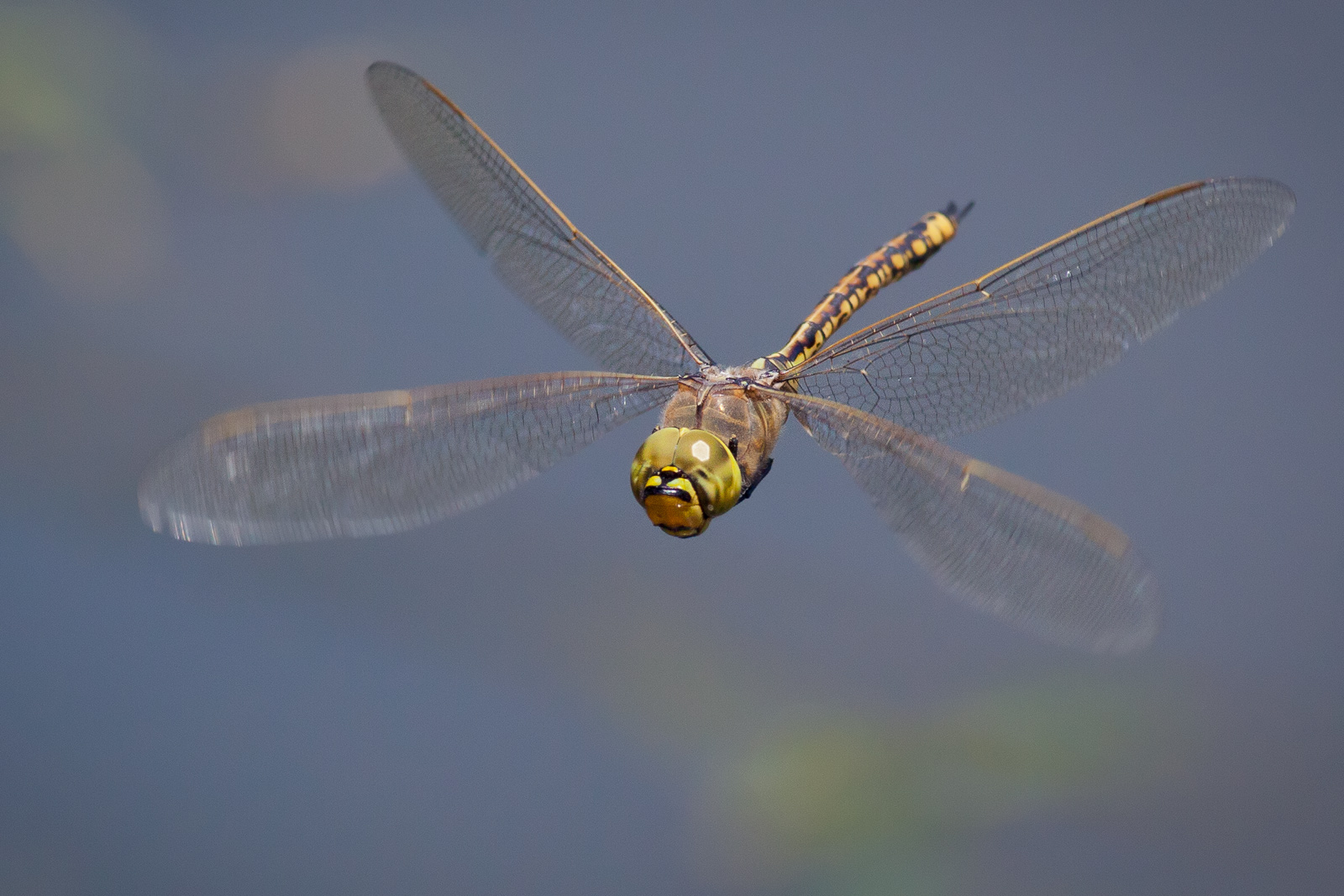
The Australian emperor dragonfly mimics the optic flow of its background using real-point motion camouflage to enable it to approach rivals.

Some animals mimic the optic flow of the background, so that the attacker does not appear to move when seen by the target. This is the main focus of work on motion camouflage, and is often treated as synonymous with it.

==== Pursuit strategies ====
An attacker can mimic the background's optic flow by choosing its flight path so as to remain on the line between the target and either some real landmark point, or a point at infinite distance (giving different pursuit algorithms). It therefore does not move from the landmark point as seen by the target, though it inevitably looms larger as it approaches. This is not the same as moving straight towards the target (classical pursuit): that results in visible sideways motion with a readily detectable difference in optic flow from the background. The strategy works whether the background is plain or textured.

This motion camouflage strategy was discovered and modelled as algorithms in 1995 by M. V. Srinivasan and M. Davey while they were studying mating behaviour in hoverflies. The male hoverfly appeared to be using the tracking technique to approach prospective mates. Motion camouflage has been observed in high-speed territorial battles between dragonflies, where males of the Australian emperor dragonfly, Hemianax papuensis were seen to choose their flight paths to appear stationary to their rivals in 6 of 15 encounters. They made use of both real-point and infinity-point strategies.

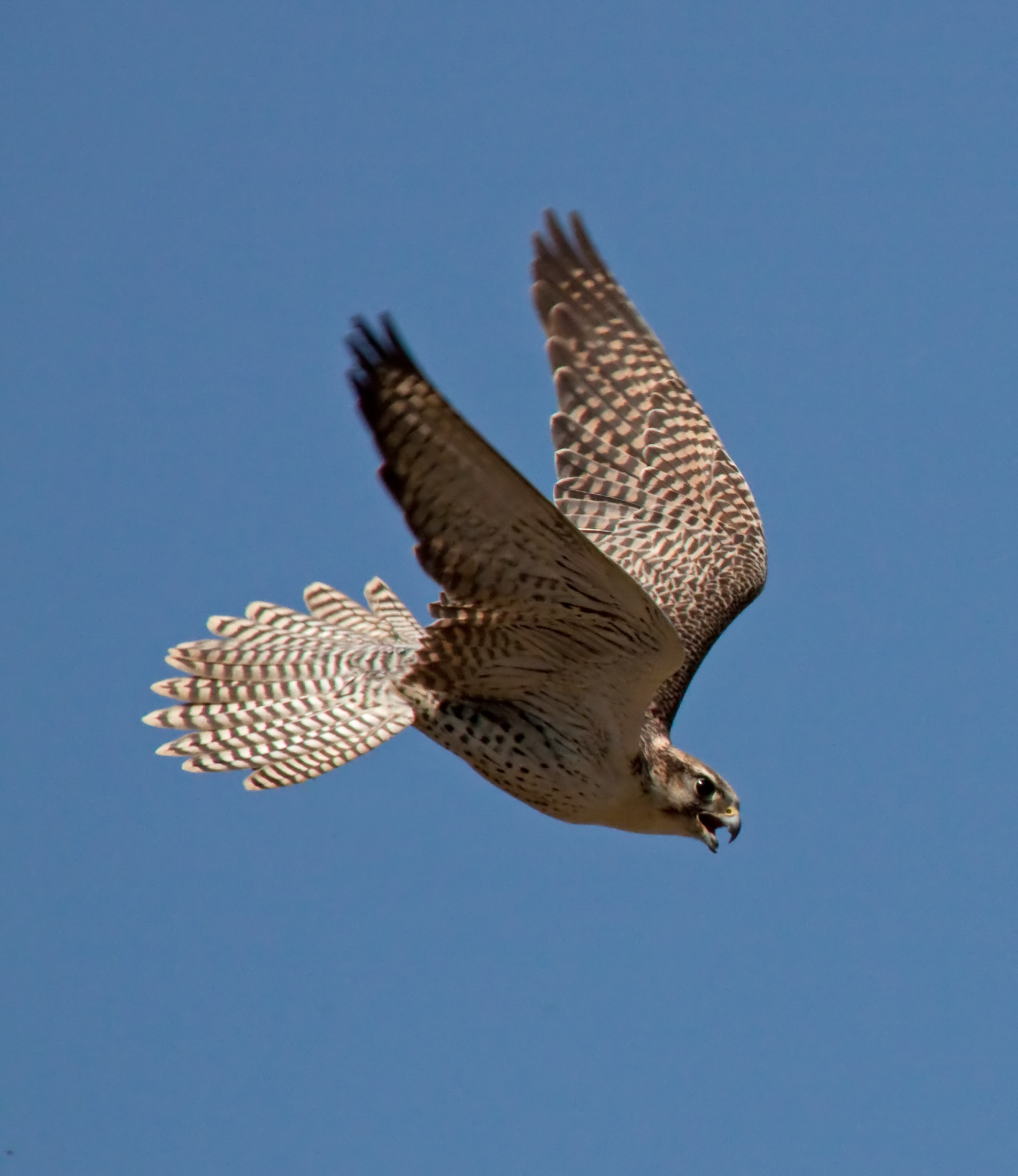
Falcons use infinite-point motion camouflage to close on their prey.

The strategy appears to work equally well in insects and in vertebrates. Simulations show that motion camouflage results in a more efficient pursuit path than classical pursuit (i.e. the motion camouflage path is shorter), whether the target flies in a straight line or chooses a chaotic path. Further, where classical pursuit requires the attacker to fly faster than the target, the motion camouflaged attacker can sometimes capture the target despite flying more slowly than it.

In sailing, it has long been known that if the bearing from the target to the pursuer remains constant, known as constant bearing, decreasing range (CBDR), equivalent to taking a fixed reference point at infinite distance, the two vessels are on a collision course, both travelling in straight lines. In a simulation, this is readily observed as the lines between the two remain parallel at all times.

Insect-hunting bats and some missiles follow an infinity-point pursuit path keeping parallel to the target ("Parallel navigation"), for its efficiency rather than for camouflage.

Echolocating bats follow an infinity-point path when hunting insects in the dark. This is not for camouflage but for the efficiency of the resulting path, so the strategy is generally called constant absolute target direction (CATD); it is equivalent to CBDR but allowing for the target to manoeuvre erratically.

A 2014 study of falcons of different species (gyrfalcon, saker falcon, and peregrine falcon) used video cameras mounted on their heads or backs to track their approaches to prey. Comparison of the observed paths with simulations of different pursuit strategies showed that these predatory birds used a motion camouflage path consistent with CATD.

The missile guidance strategy of pure proportional navigation guidance (PPNG) closely resembles the CATD strategy used by bats. The biologists Andrew Anderson and Peter McOwan have suggested that anti-aircraft missiles could exploit motion camouflage to reduce their chances of being detected. They tested their ideas on people playing a computerised war game. The steering laws to achieve motion camouflage have been analysed mathematically. The resulting paths turn out to be extremely efficient, often better than classical pursuit. Motion camouflage pursuit may therefore be adopted both by predators and missile engineers (as "parallel navigation", for an infinity-point algorithm) for its performance advantages.

Attack strategies
Strategy	Description	Camouflage effect	Used by species
Classical pursuit (pursuit guidance)	Move straight towards current position of target at all times (simplest strategy)	None, target sees pursuer moving against background	Honey bees, flies, tiger beetles
Real-point motion camouflage	Move towards target keeping between it and a point near pursuer's start at all times	Pursuer remains stationary against background (but looms larger)	Dragonflies, hoverflies
Infinity-point motion camouflage (CATD, "Parallel navigation")	Move towards target keeping line to target parallel to line between pursuer's start and target at start	Pursuer remains at a constant direction in the sky	Dogs, humans, hoverflies, teleost fish, bats, falcons

== Camouflage by motion ==
=== Swaying: motion crypsis or masquerade ===
Swaying behaviour is practised by highly cryptic animals such as the leafy sea dragon, the stick insect Extatosoma tiaratum, and mantises. These animals resemble vegetation with their coloration, strikingly disruptive body outlines with leaflike appendages, and the ability to sway effectively like the plants that they mimic. E. tiaratum actively sways back and forth or side to side when disturbed or when there is a gust of wind, with a frequency distribution like foliage rustling in the wind. This behaviour may represent motion crypsis, preventing detection by predators, or motion masquerade, promoting misclassification (as something other than prey), or a combination of the two, and has accordingly also been described as a form of motion camouflage.

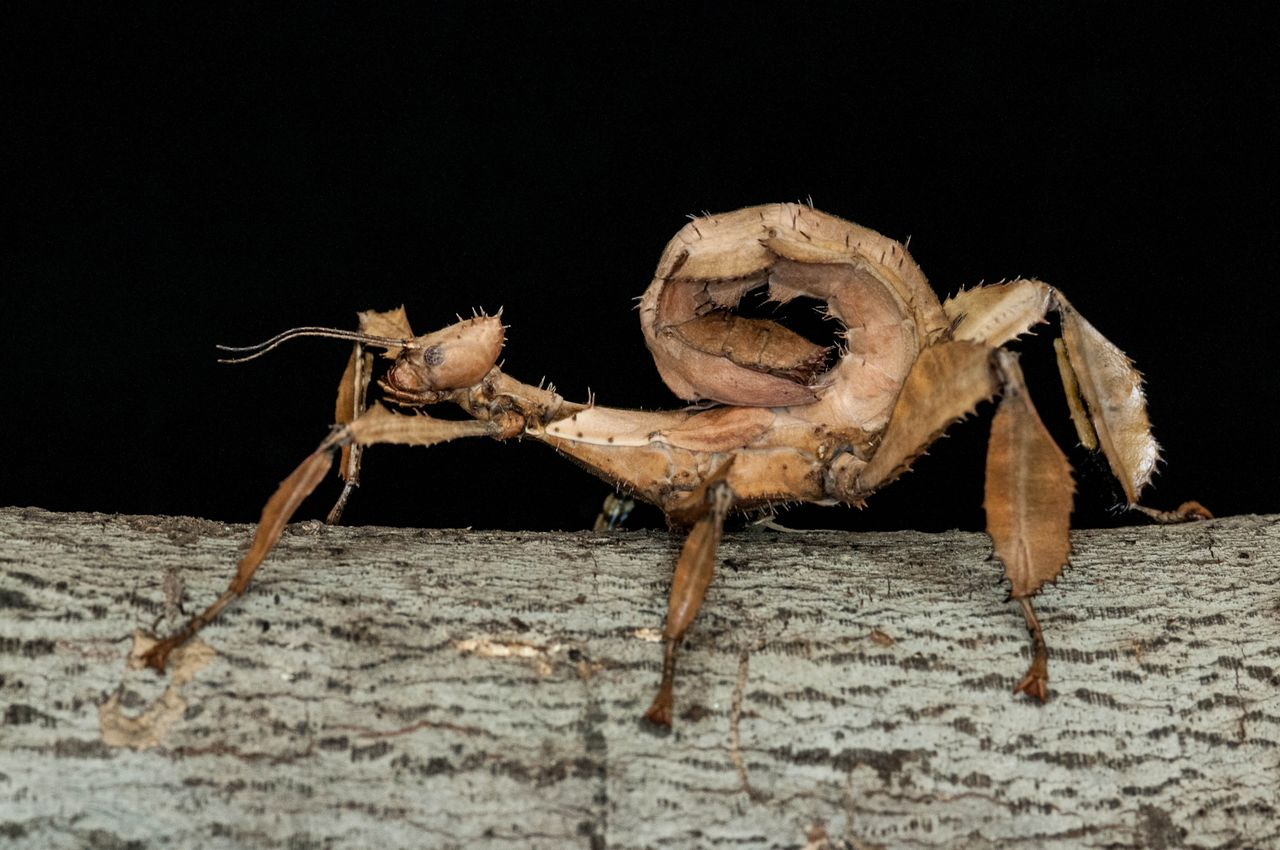
Cryptic stick insect Extatosoma tiaratum sways in the wind like foliage.

Praying mantises using swaying as camouflage
