= Pursuit guidance =

Form of missile guidance

A missile (red) using pursuit guidance intercepts a target (blue) by flying directly towards it at all times.

Pursuit guidance, or a pursuit course, is a guidance law widely used in older guided missiles.

In pursuit guidance, the missile is steered so that the velocity vector of the missile always points at the target, i.e. it has always the direction of the line of sight. This was the natural outcome of many guidance systems, notably beam riding systems where the missile followed the radar signal that was illuminating the target. As the radar typically used conical scanning in order to keep itself pointed at the target (radar lock-on), and the missile guided itself by centering itself in this beam, this caused it to always fly directly at the target.

It was also found in early laser-guided bombs with the aerodynamically stabilized seeker/guidance ("birdy") on the front of the bomb. The birdies sit on a universal joint and thus will point in the direction of the relative wind. If the laser receiver is placed on this wind stabilized reference, the angle that the laser is off the wind vector is the same as is measured relative to the centerline of the seeker. Thus, the angle is constructed easily in analog hardware.

The disadvantage of this guidance law is that in most scenarios, it will bring the missile into a tail-chase towards the end of the missile's flight. This usually requires the missile to fly for longer, increasing the likelihood that the missile will run out of fuel or otherwise not reach the target. On the other hand, tail-chases can be better for heat-seeking air-to-air missiles, since the hottest part of the target is generally the jet exhausts.

Another disadvantage is that this guidance law tends to require more maneuvering from the missile than laws such as proportional guidance, and that maneuvering may exceed the missile's performance envelope.

Since modern computers allow the implementation of more complex guidance laws with relatively little cost in weight or other design factors, pursuit guidance is rarely used in modern missiles.

== See also ==
- Index of aviation articles
