= Looming =

Type of perceptual phenomenon

Looming is a term found in the study of perception, as it relates directly to psychology. Looming occurs when an object begins moving closer to the eye. As the resulting image becomes increasingly larger on the perceiver's retina, i.e., when an object looms, there is an automatic physiological response to perceive the object as an approaching object or surface, instead of one that is stationary or receding. This sensory cue is key for collision avoidance and predator detection. A wide range of animals, including both invertebrates and vertebrates, are sensitive to looming stimuli, and looming-detection systems are present in the earliest days of life, highlighting their ecological importance. Evidence indicates that looming perception is not limited to the visual modality, but can occur due to auditory or even tactile stimuli.

In The Black Cloud, Sir Fred Hoyle evidenced for the first time a relationship between the object expansion and the time to collision.

== Parametrization ==
Consider a disk of radius l, approaching at an observer at constant speed v. Let t denote the time remaining until collision. Geometrically, the angular size $\theta(t)$ of the disk's retinal image increases non-linearly as the disk approaches, while its derivative $\frac{d\theta(t)}{dt}$ decreases. Both quantities depend on the ratio ($l/v$), which represents the disk's radius divided by its approach speed.

$\theta(t) = 2\arctan\left(\frac{l}{vt}\right)$

$\frac{d\theta(t)}{dt} = -\frac{2(l/v)}{t^2+(l/v)^2}$

Multiple other geometrical variables have been introduced to understand the perception of visual looming stimuli.

== Perception ==
By recording the activity of targeted neurons to either looming stimuli (expanding disk) or control stimuli (such as luminance increases or receding stimuli), multiple looming-selective neurons have been evidenced. Rind and colleagues recorded the activity of a locust's identified visual neuron (Descending Contralateral Movement Detector, DCMD) while the locust was watching Star Wars, and found that the activity was maximal when a TIE fighter starship approaches the screen.

A model for explaining visual looming detection is the η model. The function η maps t to dθ(t)/dt . exp(-aθ(t)), where a is a constant. This function, that multiplies the angular velocity (excitatory term) by the negative exponential of the angular size (inhibitory term) predict the firing activity of Invertebrates' collision-sensitive neurons. This suggests that such neurons act as angular size threshold detectors.

== Robotics ==
Understanding the perception of looming stimuli proved valuable for the design of self-driving cars.

== Miscellaneous ==
There is a type of refraction phenomenon that is also described as looming, in which distant objects appear much nearer than they actually are. This is explained in the same way as the image of the ship, except that the image is not inverted; the variations in density may also act as a magnifying glass.

Sharp edge eye syndrome (SEES), sometimes known as visual looming syndrome, is a condition in which the patient experiences ocular pain or discomfort when viewing or mentally picturing sharp objects and edges. Patients may present for medical care because they perceive the condition to represent an ophthalmic problem or a sign of a more serious underlying condition.

== See also ==
- Motion camouflage
- Optic flow
- Predator avoidance
