= Homing guidance =

Missile guidance method using onboard sensors

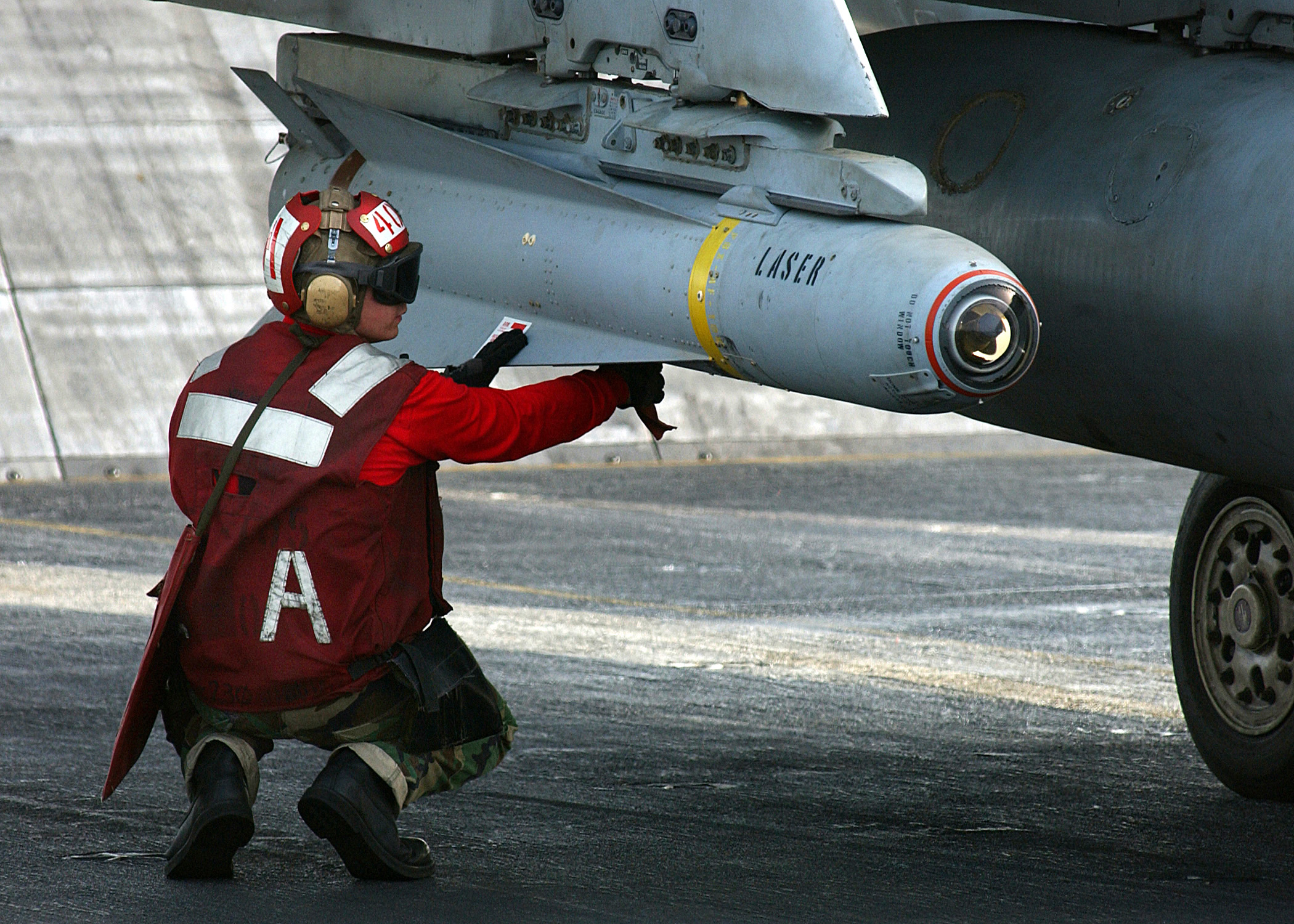
AGM-65E Maverick laser-guided missile

Homing guidance is a form of missile guidance that uses sensors within the missile to seek its target. Possible sensors include radar, infrared sensors, or light sensors. Homing guidance does not usually require communication with a ground station or other launch platform.

== Radar homing ==
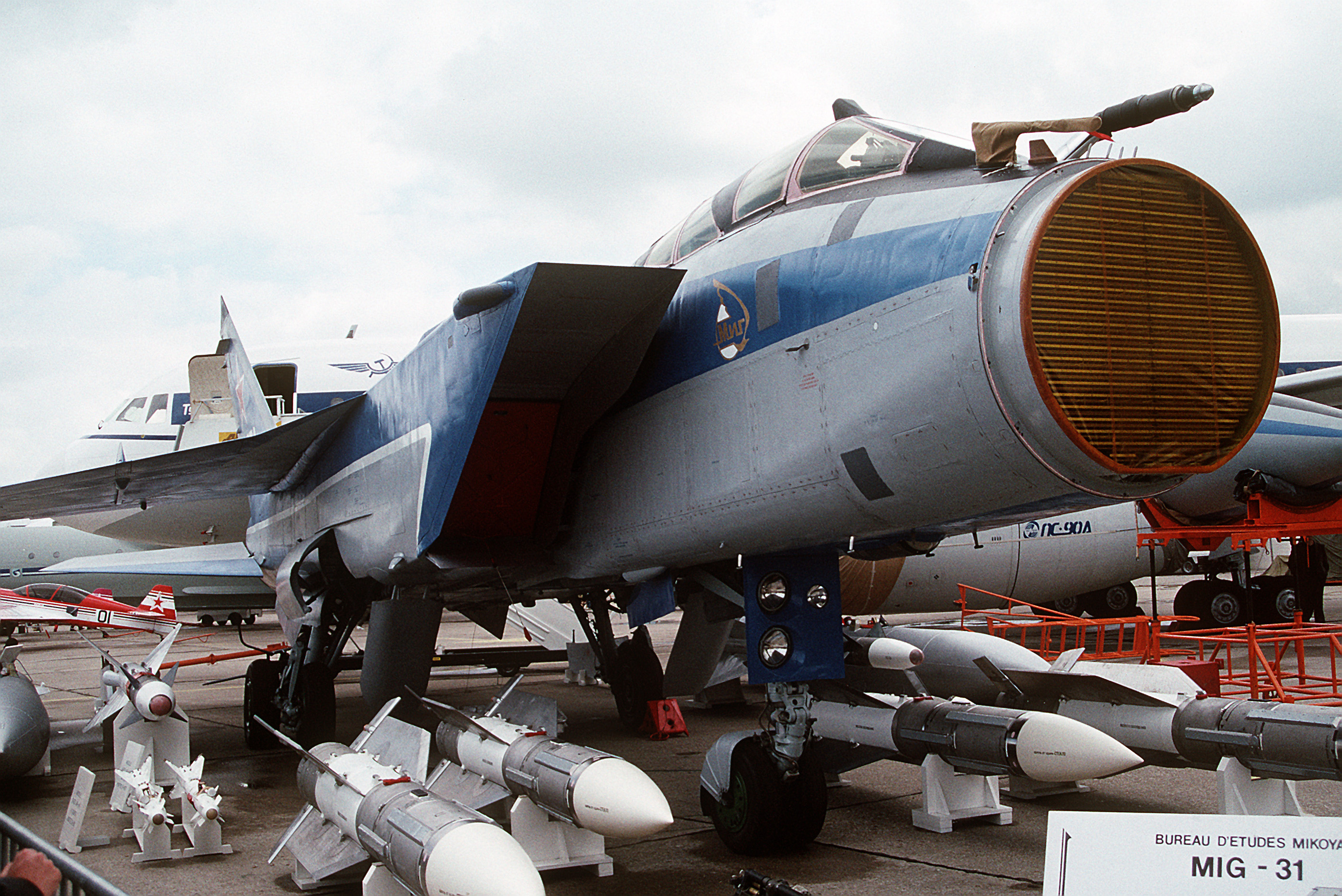
MiG-31 with its nose cone removed, showing its Zaslon radar for tracking targets. Below it are four R-33 missiles which use semi-active radar homing.

Active radar homing (ARH) uses a radar system on the missile to illuminate and track the target. After launch, these missiles require no further effort from the launching aircraft, an advantage termed fire-and-forget or launch-and-leave. ARH tends to be heavier and more expensive than other homing systems, and can be vulnerable to jamming because it emits a radar signal that reveals its presence. Typically, electronics in the missile keep the radar pointed directly at the target, and the missile then looks at this "angle" of its own centerline to guide itself. Radar resolution is based on the size of the antenna, so in a smaller missile these systems are useful for attacking only large targets, ships or large bombers for instance. Active radar systems remain in widespread use in anti-ship missiles, and in air-to-air missile systems such as the AIM-120 AMRAAM and R-77.

In semi-active radar homing (SARH), the missile has a radar receiver but not a transmitter, and a separate targeting radar is required to illuminate the target. The targeting radar may be on the ground, or aboard a ship or aircraft. Since the missile is typically being launched after the target was detected using a powerful radar system, it makes sense to use that same radar system to track the target, thereby avoiding problems with resolution or power, and reducing the weight of the missile. SARH is by far the most common "all weather" guidance solution for anti-aircraft systems, both ground- and air-launched.

In SARH, since the targeting radar is separate from the missile, its angle to the target may mean that little energy is reflected to the missile, which can potentially result in a miss. The target must remain illuminated until interception, which restricts the possible maneuvers the launching aircraft can perform. This has the potential to bring the aircraft within range of shorter-ranged IR-guided (infrared-guided) missile systems. It is an important consideration now that "all aspect" IR missiles are capable of "kills" from head on, something which did not prevail in the early days of guided missiles. For ships and mobile or fixed ground-based systems, this is irrelevant as the speed (and often size) of the launch platform precludes "running away" from the target or opening the range so as to make the enemy attack fail.

Track-via-missile, also called retransmission guidance, uses elements of command guidance and semi-active radar homing. As in SARH, the target is illuminated by the tracking radar, and the missile detects this radiation, while being controlled by commands from the tracking station. An example of track-via-missile is the MIM-104 Patriot surface-to-air missile system.

Anti-radiation missiles passively home in on radio emission by a target, such as radar waves. These are usually used against radar systems, but they can be designed for use against any radio source, such as jammers or communication radios.

== Optical homing ==
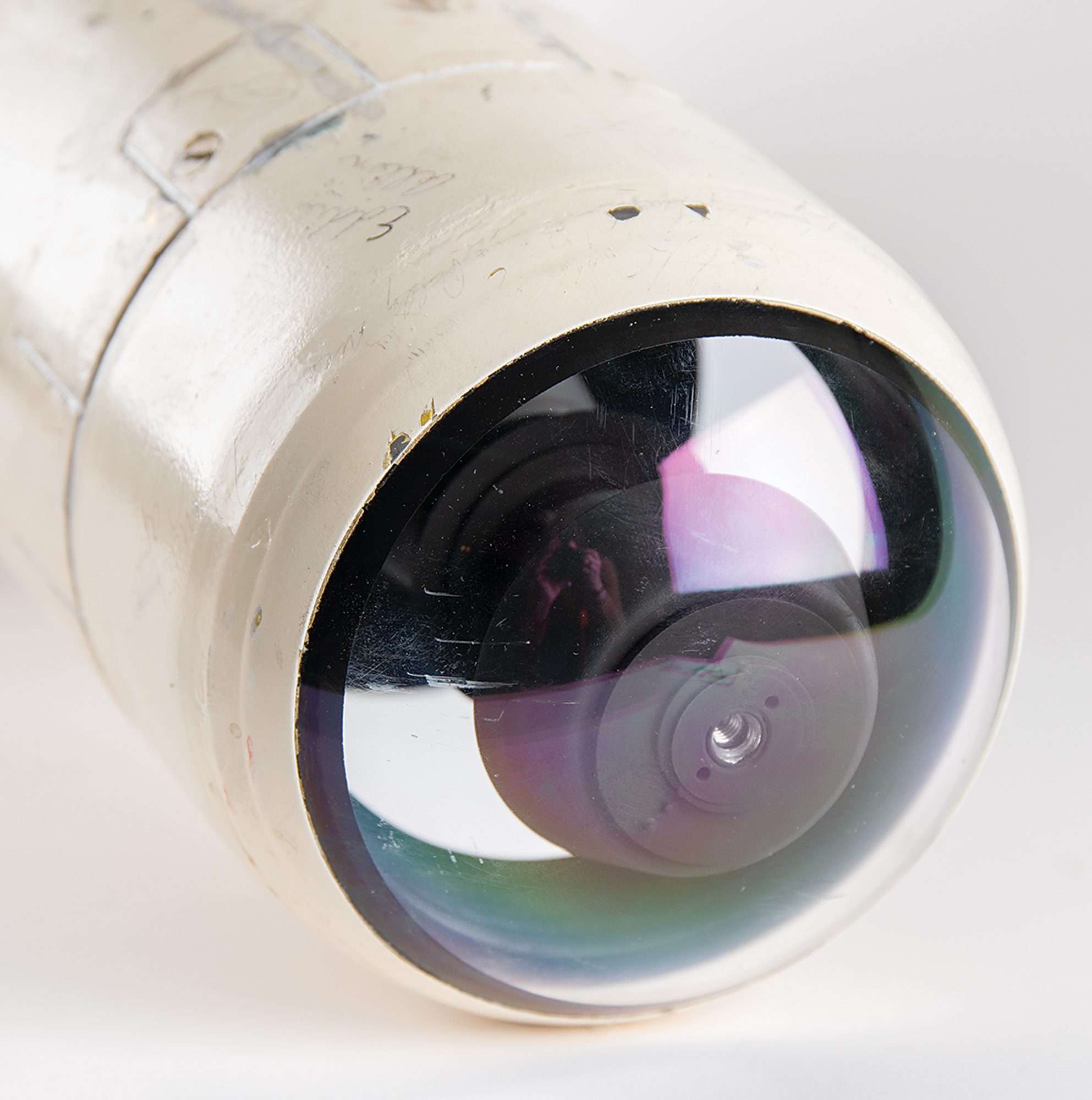
The infrared seeker of an AIM-9B Sidewinder missile

Infrared homing passively tracks infrared radiation emitted by the target. Typically used in the anti-aircraft role to track the heat of jet engines, it has also been used in the anti-vehicle role with some success. This means of guidance is sometimes also referred to as "heat seeking".

Contrast seekers use a video camera, typically black and white, to image a field of view in front of the missile, which is presented to the operator. When launched, the electronics in the missile look for the spot on the image where the contrast changes the fastest, both vertically and horizontally, and then attempts to keep that spot at a constant location in its view. Contrast seekers have been used for air-to-ground missiles, including the AGM-65 Maverick, because most ground targets can be distinguished only by visual means. However they rely on there being strong contrast changes to track, and even traditional camouflage can render them unable to "lock on".

Laser guidance, sometimes known as semi-active laser homing, homes in on the illumination of a target by a laser designator separate from the missile or bomb. Laser guidance is very accurate but does not work well against maneuvering targets. Unobstructed line of sight from the designator to the target is required, and the target must stay illuminated while the weapon homes. The laser designator may be human-operated from the ground, aboard the attacking aircraft, or aboard an other aircraft such as an unmanned aerial vehicle. Targeting pods aboard aircraft often contain a laser designator for this purpose.

== Guidance laws ==
Regardless of how a missile obtains target information, it must steer in order to hit the target. A guidance law is what determines how the missile steers. Guidance laws are designed not to exceed the structural or aerodynamic limits of the missiles they control, and may optimize for considerations such as reducing time of flight.

Guidance is usually divided into three phases: boost, midcourse, and terminal. Modern missiles tend to use a different guidance law for each phase. The boost phase is often unguided while the missile initially picks up speed. Long-range missiles, if they are launched from beyond their own sensor range, require a midcourse phase to close distance. During this phase, missiles may use inertial navigation, external command guidance, or a combination of both. The terminal, or homing phase begins when the missile is close enough to lock on with its own sensors. Short-range missiles often lack a midcourse phase.

In proportional navigation, also known as collision homing, the missile steers to reduce the rate of change in line of sight (LOS) to its target. It is based on the fact that two objects are on a collision course when the direction of the LOS between them does not change. Proportional navigation is the most commonly used missile guidance law, especially during the terminal phase of flight. It is effective against moving targets and simple to implement, requiring only angle sensors to the target. It has been adapted into a variety of guidance laws to improve its flexibility, for example, against accelerating targets.

In pursuit guidance, the missile flies directly along the LOS to the target at all times. This form of guidance was common in early missiles but is now considered impractical. During the last moments of flight, this form of guidance often requires impossibly high acceleration to hit maneuvering targets. It also often results in a tail-chase with the target, meaning that it must be considerably faster than the target to be effective. The best application of pursuit guidance is against slow-moving targets or on a head-on course.

Gallery

Proportional Navigation: A missile (red) intercepts a target (blue) by maintaining constant bearing to it. The lines of sight (grey) are parallel throughout the flight.

Pursuit: A missile intercepts a target by flying directly towards it at all times.

== See also ==
- Guidance, navigation, and control
