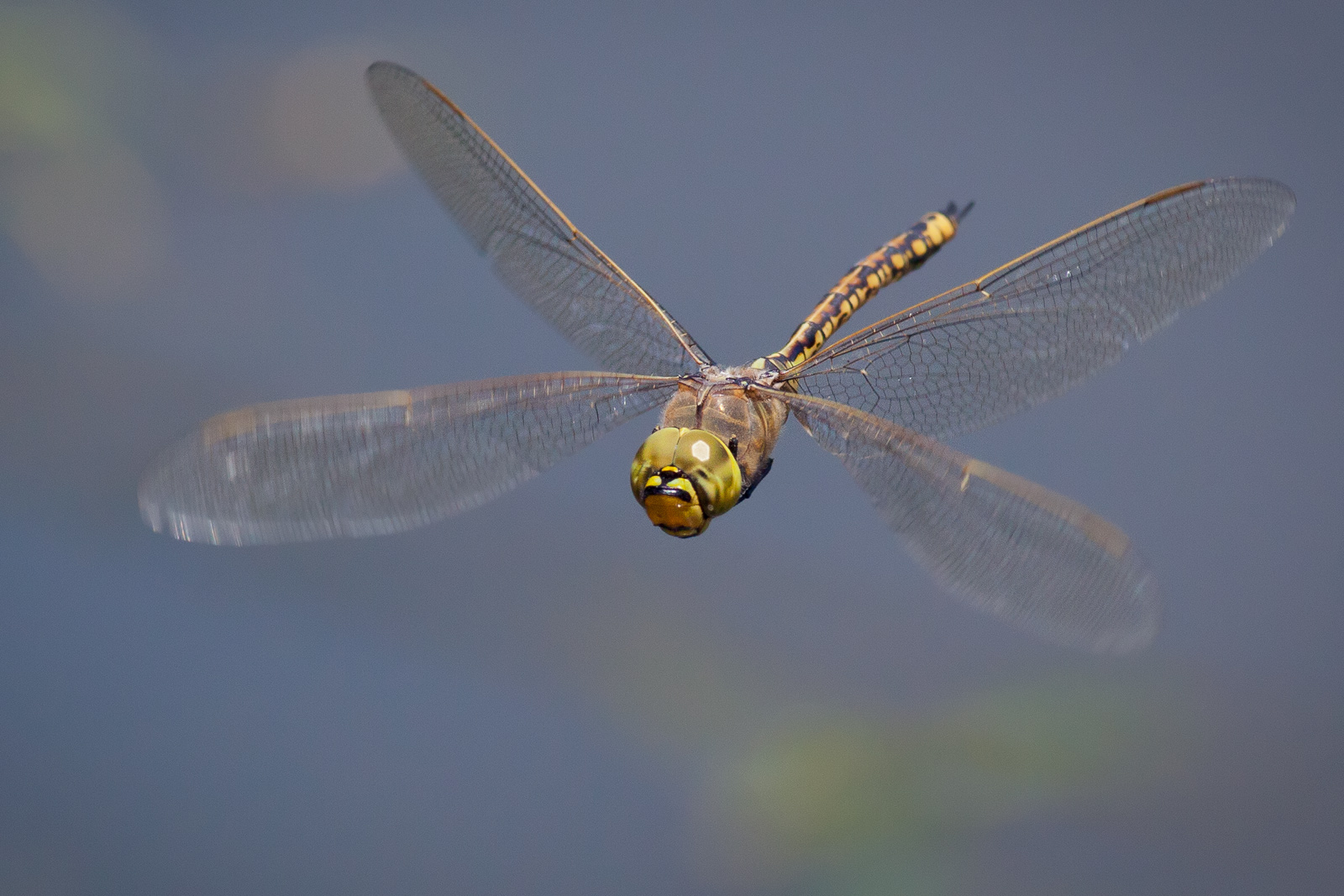

Conservation status
- Least Concern (IUCN 3.1)

Scientific classification
- Kingdom: Animalia
- Phylum: Arthropoda
- Clade: Pancrustacea
- Class: Insecta
- Order: Odonata
- Infraorder: Anisoptera
- Family: Aeshnidae
- Genus: Anax
- Species: A. papuensis

Binomial name
- Anax papuensis (Burmeister, 1839)

Synonyms
- Aeschna papuensis Burmeister, 1839; Anax congener Rambur, 1842; Hemianax papuensis (Burmeister, 1839)

= Australian emperor =

Species of dragonfly

The Australian emperor dragonfly, also known as the yellow emperor dragonfly, the Baron Dragonfly in New Zealand, scientific name Anax papuensis, is a species of dragonfly in the Aeshnidae family. It is black with yellow dots along its tail.

== Description ==
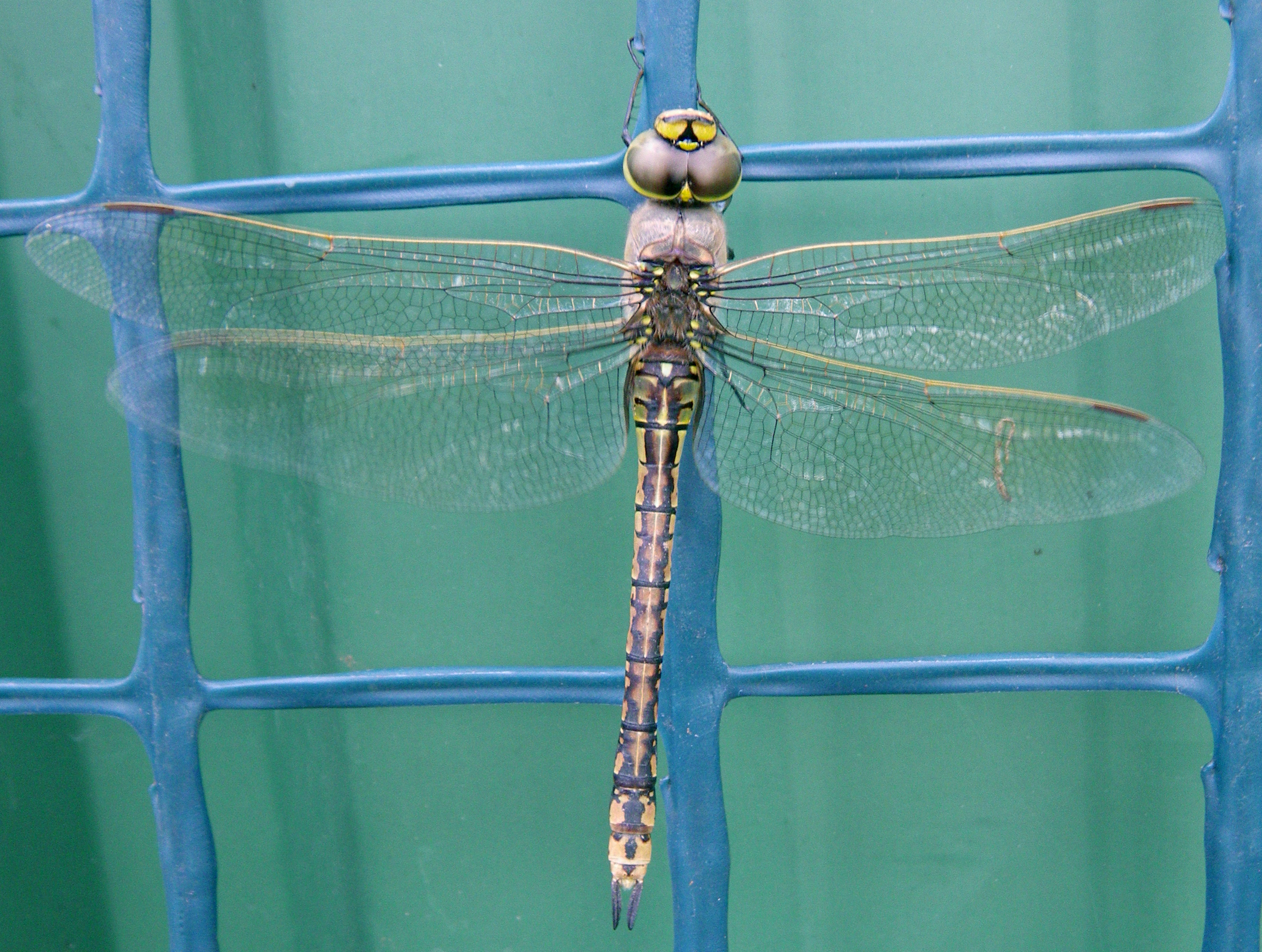
Female Australian emperor.

The Australian emperor is a very large dragonfly, up to 70 mm long. Its abdomen is marked boldly in black and yellow. The thorax is greenish-grey. The head is yellow with a T-shaped mark on the forehead (frons). The eyes are yellow-green. The leading edges of the wings are yellow. The insect habitually hunts fairly slowly, patrolling up and down like other hawkers, with short bursts at high speed.

Their wingspan is 11 centimetres (4.3 in). Males and females are similar.

== Distribution and habitat ==
The Australian emperor is found throughout Australia. In the state of Victoria, it has a split distribution: below about 600 metres in altitude, and above about 1200 metres, apparently because it avoids forested areas. It is also found in New Zealand, New Guinea, the Cocos-Keeling Islands, Java, Sumba and New Caledonia.

The Australian emperor is widespread and common on larger bodies of water with tall vegetation on the banks. Like other hawkers, it may hunt far from water. It flies throughout the summer from September to May.

== Behaviour ==
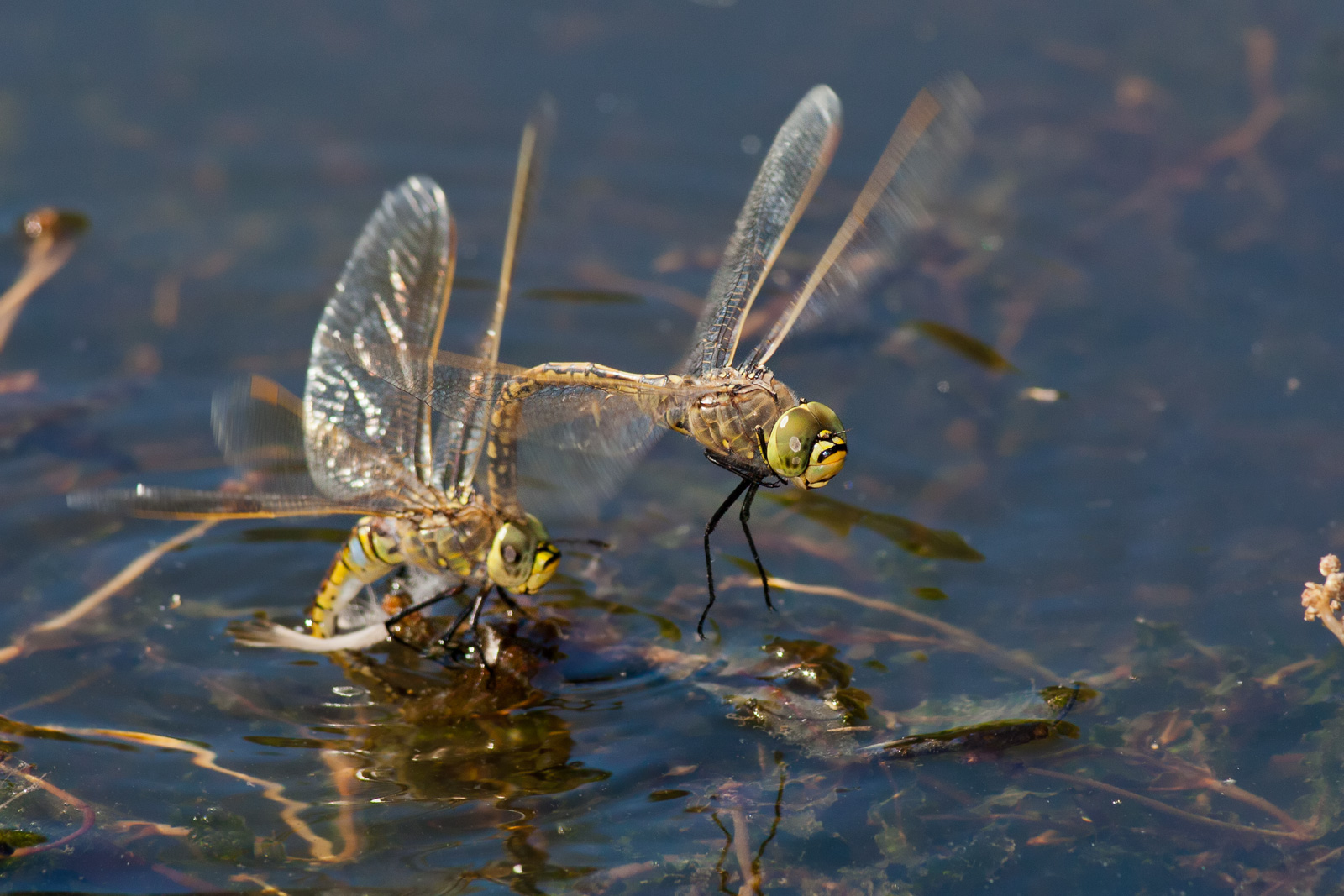
Australian emperor laying eggs, guarded by the male in tandem position

The Australian emperor is notable as the dragonfly in which motion camouflage was studied by Mizutani et al.: males of Anax papuensis are fiercely territorial, and approach and attack rivals, the males choose a flight path that keeps their image as seen by the target still with respect to a landmark point. The attacking dragonfly thus looms larger in the target's eyes, but otherwise does not seem to move until it is very close.

The males are very protective of their females. In case of intrusion of another individual, he will drive it away by engaging in a series of noisy air battles. Females lay their eggs under water.

== Etymology ==
The genus name Anax is derived from the Greek ἄναξ (anax, "king" or "sovereign"), likely referring to the dominant behaviour of Anax imperator.

The species name papuensis is derived from Papua and the Latin suffix -ensis ("originating from" or "inhabiting"), although the name may be misleading, as the species had not been recorded from Papua New Guinea at the time it was described.

== Gallery ==
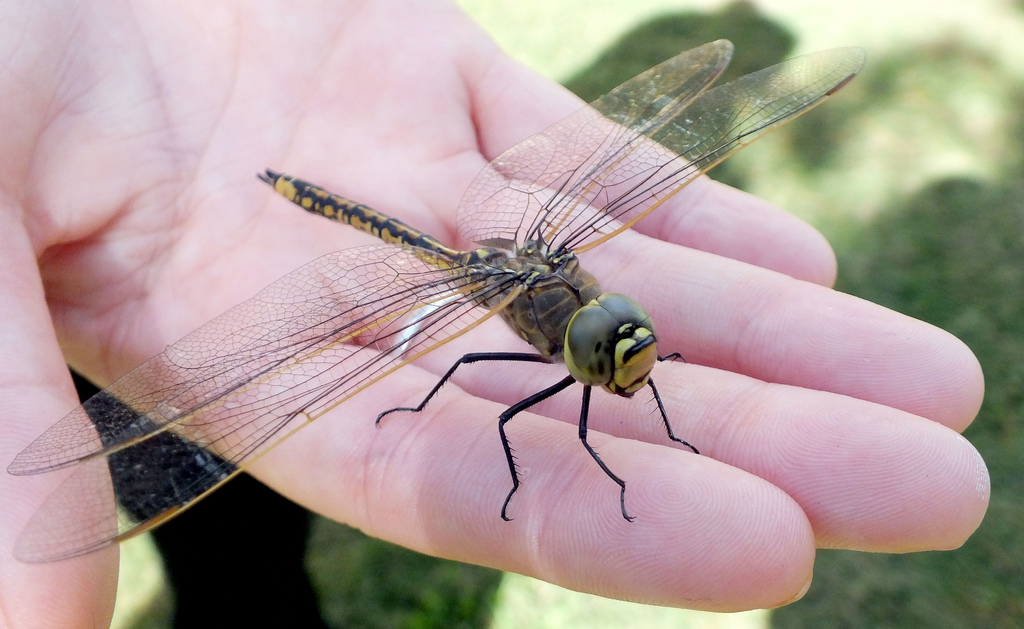
Australian emperor has a wingspan of about 11 cm

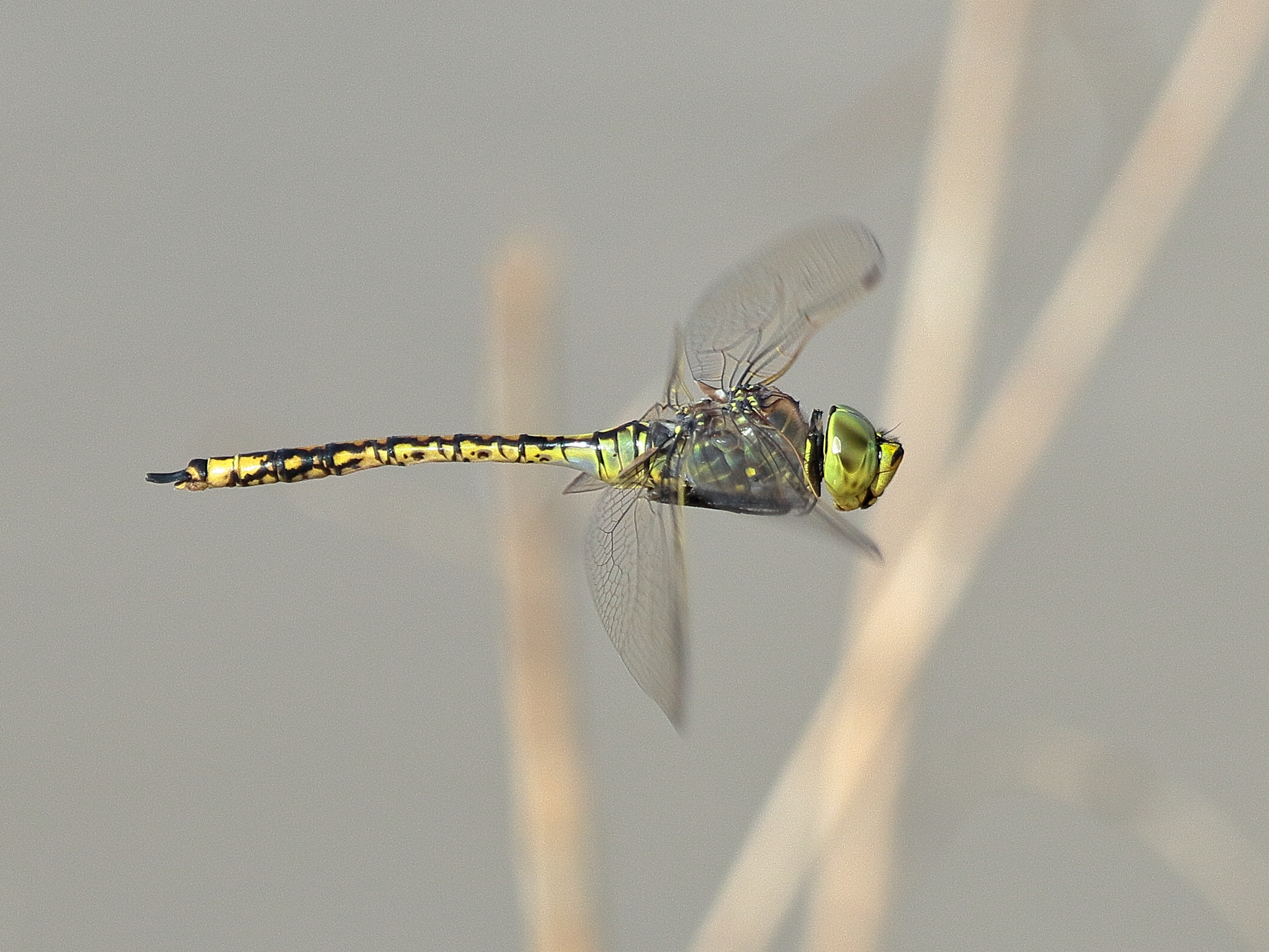
Male in flight

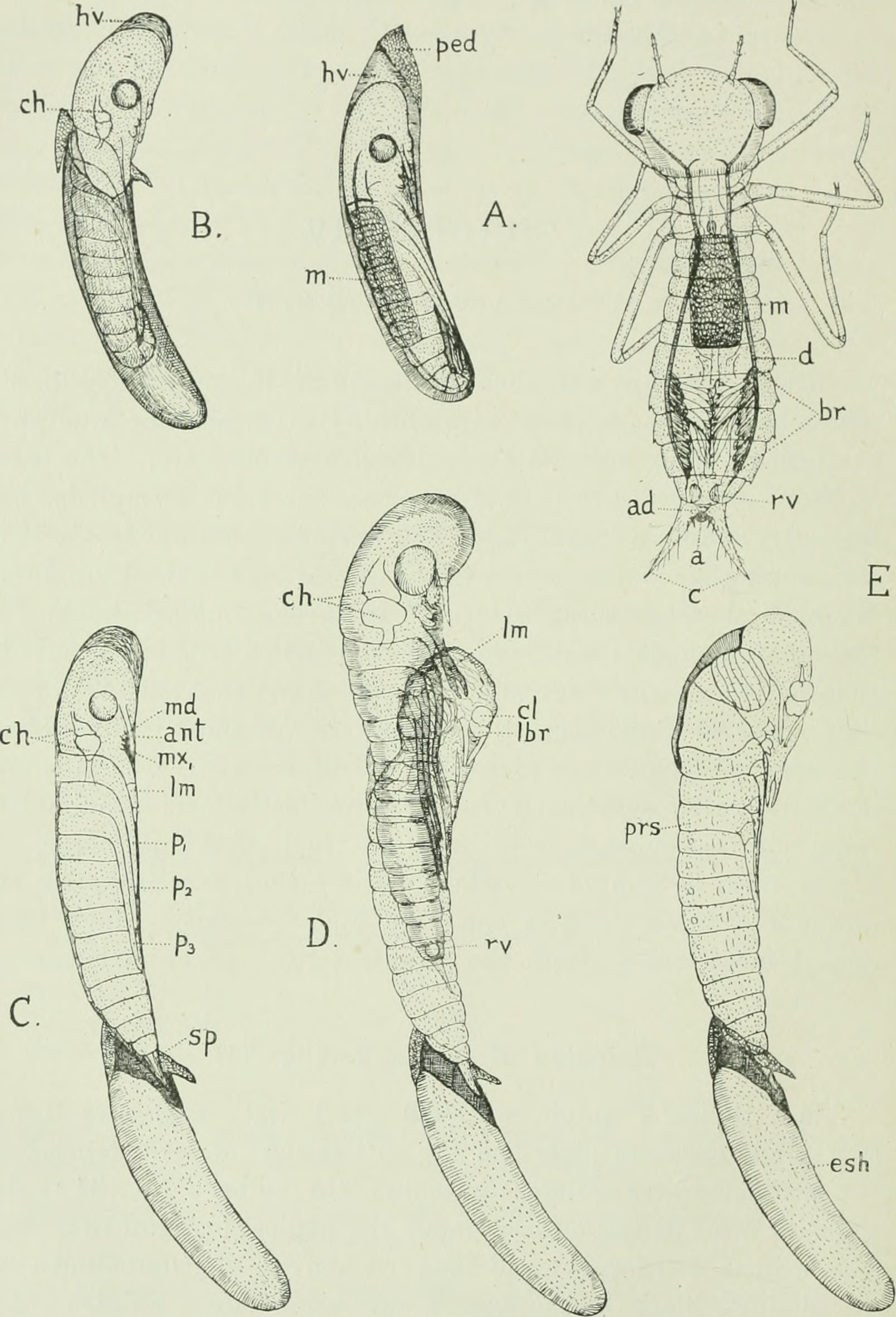
Hatching of larva

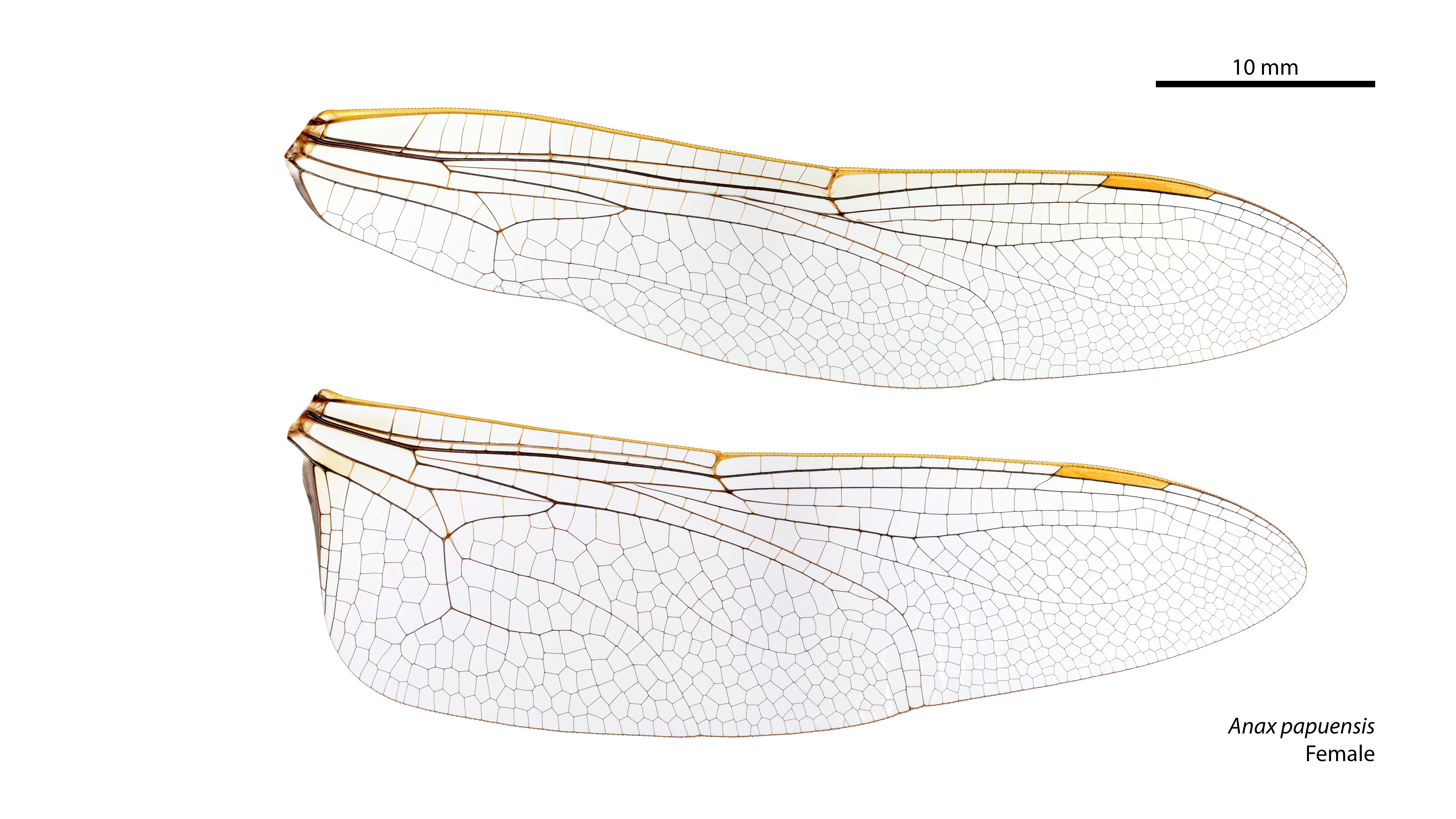
Female wings

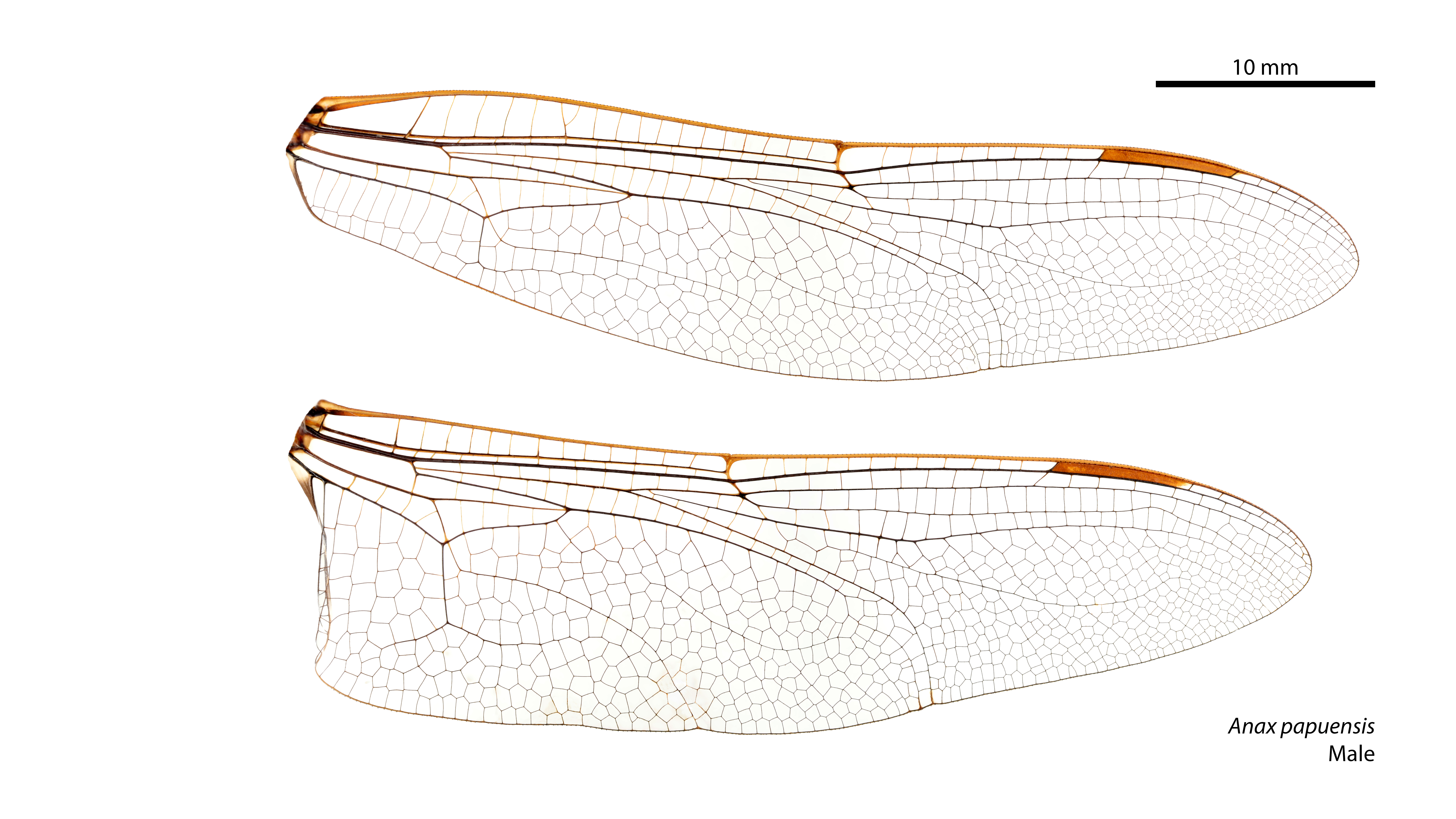
Male wings

== See also ==
- List of dragonflies of Australia

== Bibliography ==
- Günther Theischinger and John Hawking. The Complete Field Guide to Dragonflies of Australia. CSIRO Publishing, 2006. ISBN 978 0 64309 073 6
