= Line of sight (missile) =

In missile guidance, a line of sight (LOS) refers to a straight line directly to a target. The line may originate from either a missile or a tracking station, depending on context. In homing guidance, when a missile tracks the target using its own sensors, LOS refers to the line from the missile to the target. In command to line-of-sight (CLOS), which does not require a seeker onboard the missile, LOS refers to a line from a tracking radar to the target.

== See also ==
- Constant bearing, decreasing range
- Index of aviation articles

== Literature ==
- Tactical and Strategic Missile Guidance, Paul Zarchan, American Institute of Aeronautics and Astronautics Inc.
