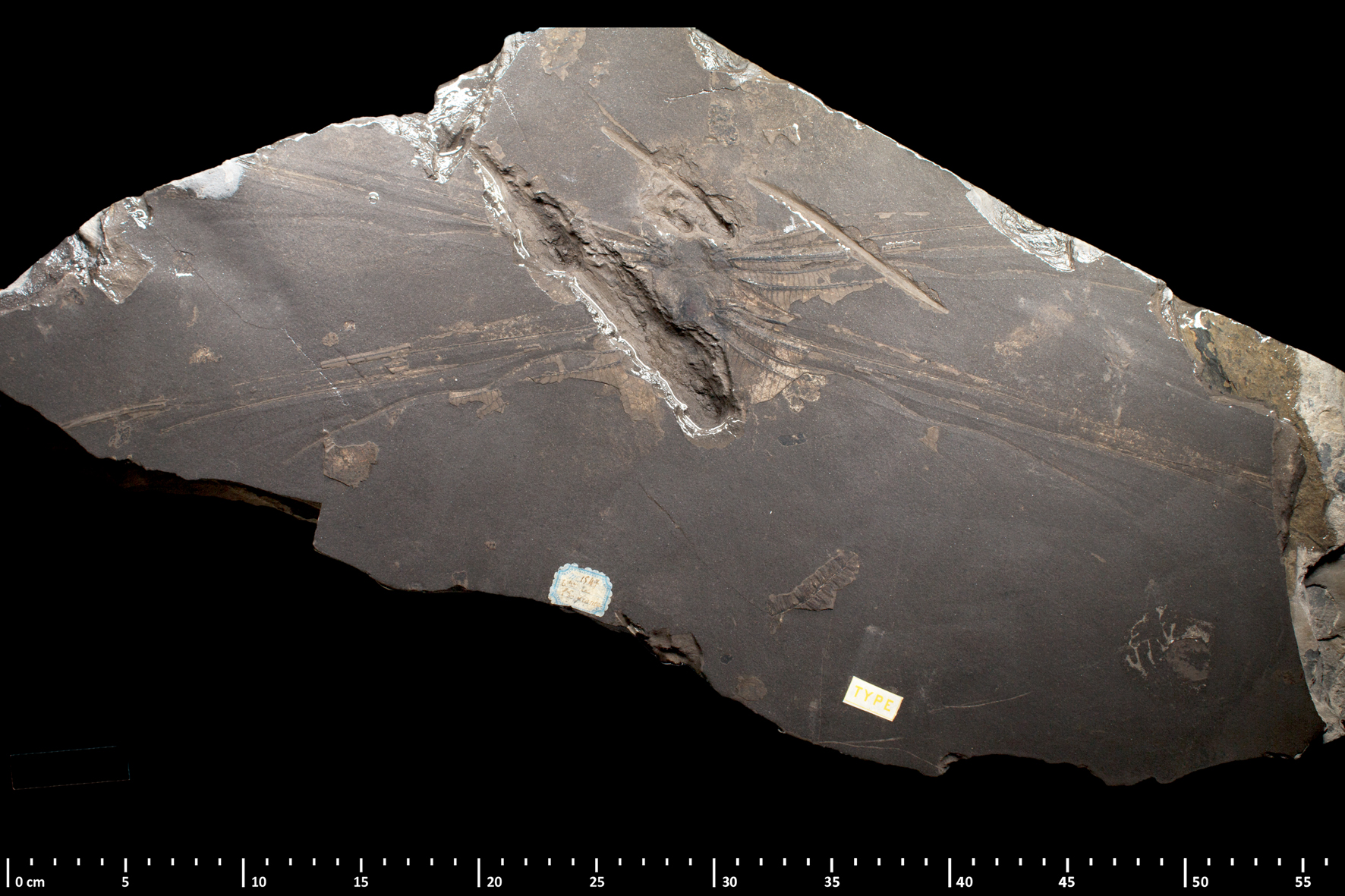
- Original (and most complete) specimen of Meganeura monyi, MNHN R51142
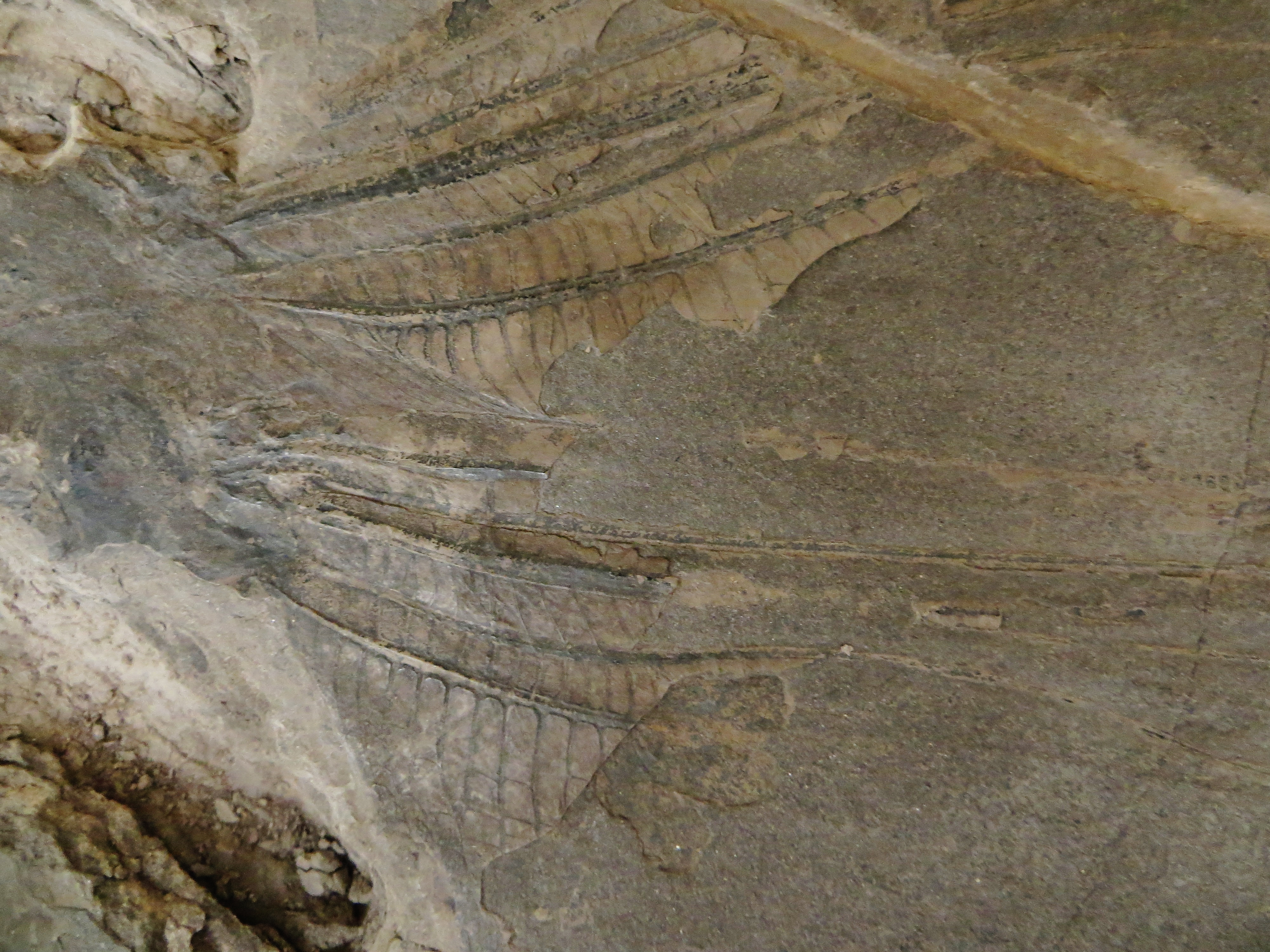
- Close view of the wings of the original Meganeura monyi specimen

Scientific classification
- Kingdom: Animalia
- Phylum: Arthropoda
- Clade: Pancrustacea
- Class: Insecta
- Infraclass: Palaeoptera
- Superorder: Odonatoptera
- Order: †Meganisoptera
- Family: †Meganeuridae
- Genus: †Meganeura; Brongniart, 1885
- Species: †M. monyi

Binomial name
- †Meganeura monyi (Brongniart, 1884) Brongniart, 1885

Synonyms
- Genus synonymy: Meganeurella Handlirsch, 1919; Species synonymy: Dictyoneura monyi Brongniart, 1884; Meganeura aeroplana Handlirsch, 1919; M. brongniarti Handlirsch, 1906; M. brongniartiana Handlirsch, 1919; M. draco Handlirsch, 1919; M. fafnir Handlirsch, 1906; M. rapax Handlirsch, 1919

= Meganeura =

Meganeura Temporal range: Carboniferous, Late Pennsylvanian (Gzhelian)

Extinct genus of insects

Meganeura (Ancient Greek: μέγα (large) + νευρόν (vein or nerve)) is a genus of extinct insects from the Late Carboniferous (about 300 million years ago). It is a member of the extinct order Meganisoptera (also known as griffenflies), which resemble dragonflies and damselflies (with dragonflies, damselflies, and meganisopterans being part of the broader group Odonatoptera). While various species of Meganeura have been named, only one is now considered valid, the type species, M. monyi.

Fossils of Meganeura were first discovered in Late Carboniferous (Stephanian) Coal Measures of Commentry, France, in 1880. In 1884, French paleontologist Charles Brongniart described the type specimen and assigned it to the genus Dictyoneura. The following year, he assigned it to a genus of its own, Meganeura, a name which refers to the network of veins on the insect's wings. Several specimens have been discovered since, though all are poorly preserved and some have been reassigned to other genera. All valid specimens of Meganeura are housed in the National Museum of Natural History in Paris. The genus belongs to the Meganeuridae, a family including other similarly giant dragonfly-like insects ranging from the Late Carboniferous to Middle Permian. Despite being the iconic "giant dragonfly", fossils of Meganeura are poorly preserved in comparison to most of its relatives.

With single wing length reaching 32 centimetres (13 in), a wingspan around 65–75 cm (2.13–2.46 ft), and mass estimates ranging from 17.8 g (0.039 lb) to 100–150 g (0.22–0.33 lb) M. monyi is one of the largest known flying insect species and is considerably larger than the biggest modern dragonfly, Petalura ingentissima. Based on other meganeurids, it would have had large compound eyes, which met along the midline, similar to some modern dragonflies. It was equipped with large spines on its tarsi (the end segments of its limbs), like those of modern odonatopterans, which would have been used for prey capture. Like other odonatopterans, meganeurids such as Meganeura were predatory, with their diet mainly consisting of other insects. Their size and wing anatomy means that they were not capable of the same kinds of abrupt direction changes as modern dragonflies, and they may have spent much of their time perching to properly oxygenate their tissues, as insects’ largely passive respiratory system diffuses oxygen to their tissues with difficulty at large body sizes.

Much debate exists regarding how Meganeura attained such a large body size, with hypotheses ranging from a correlation with the high oxygen content of the Late Carboniferous (though this is contradicted by the presence of giant meganisopterans in the Late Permian, after oxygen levels had dropped) to the absence of other big aerial predators. The extinction of meganisopterans as a whole and the absence of similarly large flying insects may correlate with the evolution of flying tetrapods such as pterosaurs.

== Discovery ==
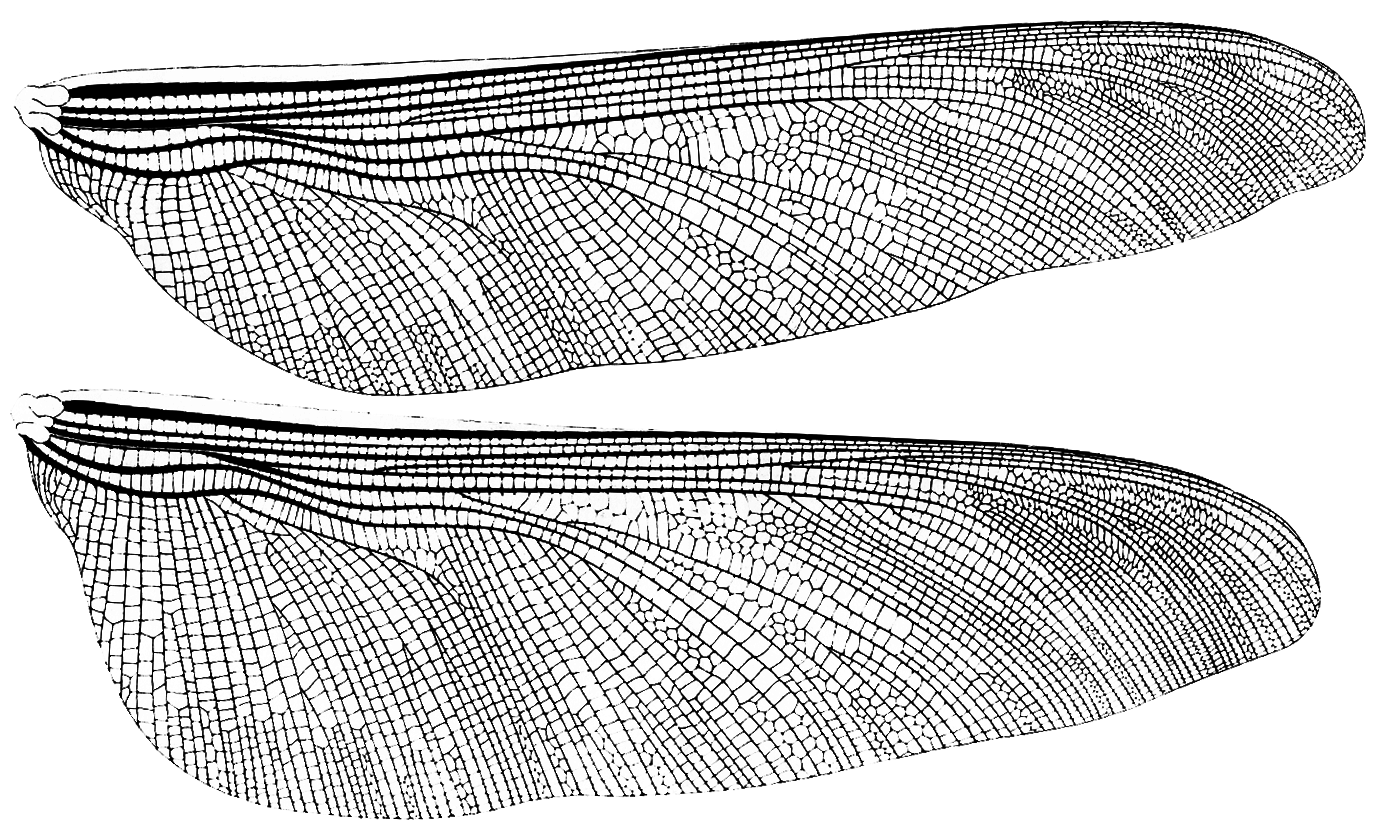
Historical restoration of the wings of Meganeura from a 1894 monograph by Charles Brongniart. These wing reconstructions are now considered inaccurate.

In the late 1870s, the Commentry Shales attracted Charles Brongniart, a pioneering paleoentomologist from the Muséum national d'histoire naturelle (MNHN, the National Natural History Museum in Paris). In 1884, Brongniart published a brief article summarizing a few gigantic insect fossils supplied by Commentry's mining engineer, Henri Fayol. One fossil was a four-winged insect, with each wing at least 30 cm (12 in) long. Brongniart found it similar to Dictyoneura, an insect now recognized as a member of the extinct order Palaeodictyoptera. He named the four-winged fossil as a new species, Dictyoneura monyi, in honor of Stéphane Mony, the recently deceased manager of the Commentry mines.

The following year, Brongniart decided to separate Dictyoneura monyi into its own genus: Meganeura, meaning "large vein". By 1894, he had accumulated enough insect fossils to publish a detailed monograph. Brongniart's monograph recognized six specimens of Meganeura monyi: the original four-winged specimen and five isolated wing fragments. Half a century later, entomologist Frank M. Carpenter in 1943 realized that half of Brongniart's specimens were actually counterparts of the other half, meaning that only three unique individuals were in Brongniart's collection. Entomologist Fernand Meunier in 1909 listed an additional Meganeura monyi specimen at the MNHN, a slab preserving portions of the thorax, wings, and spiny legs.

=== Other species ===
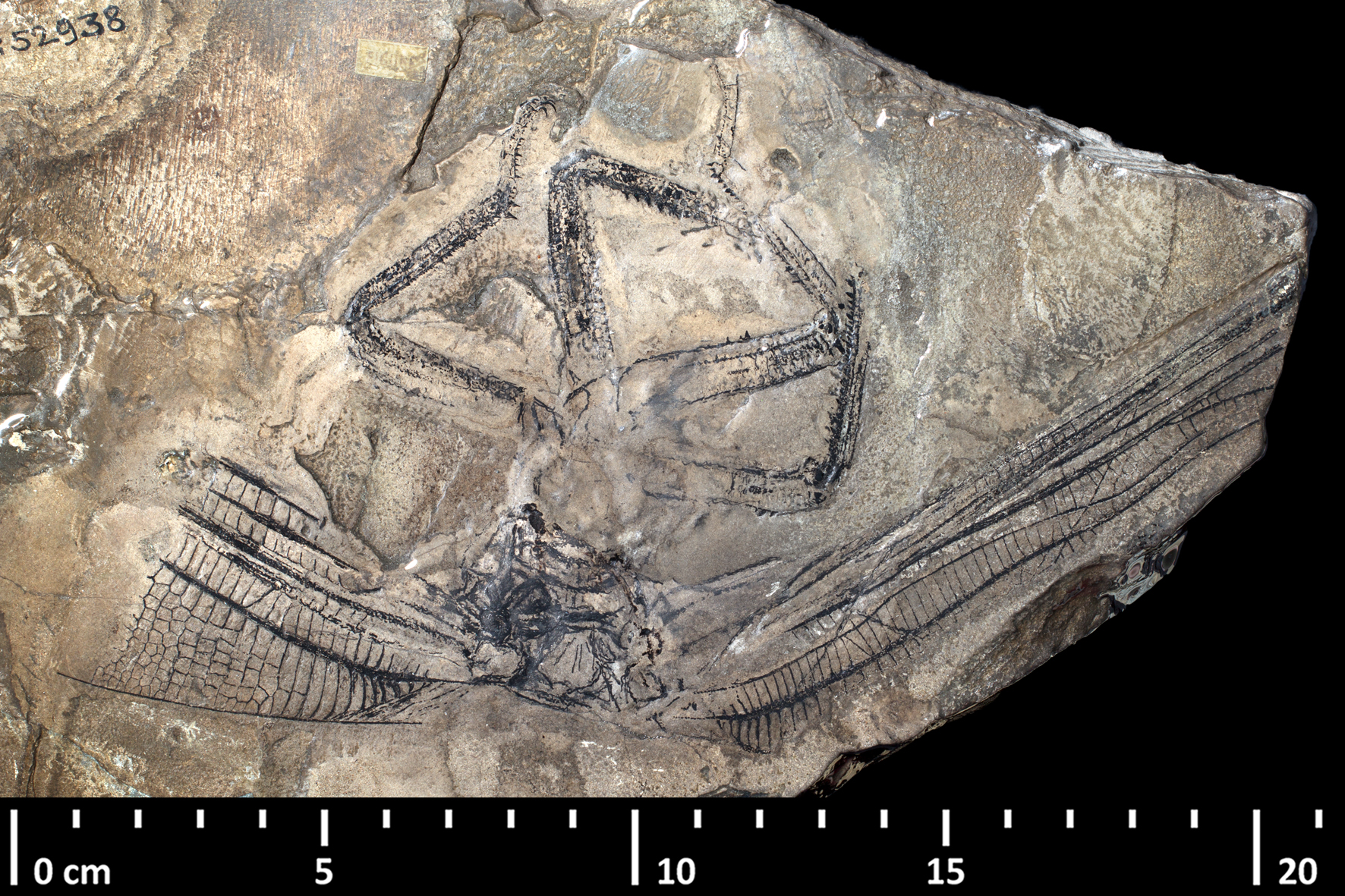
Meunier (1909)'s specimen, MNHN R52938 (named as ''Meganeurella rapax'' by Handlirsch, 1919)

In the decades between Brongniart's monograph and Carpenter's 1943 revision, a great deal of confusion arose regarding how many species belonged in the genus Meganeura. Beyond M. monyi, Brongniart proposed a second species, Meganeura selysii. Most subsequent studies classified M. selysii as a separate genus, Meganeurula, though some authors only reluctantly maintained separation between the two genera.

Entomologist Anton Handlirsch named five new Meganeura species based on the illustrated M. monyi wing fragments in Brongniart's monograph, but he did not inspect the fossils in person. Handlirsch's Meganeura species include M. brongniarti, M. fafnir (named in 1906), M. brongniartiana, M. draco, and M. aeroplana (named in 1919). His 1919 report also created a new genus and species for Meunier's specimen: Meganeurella rapax.

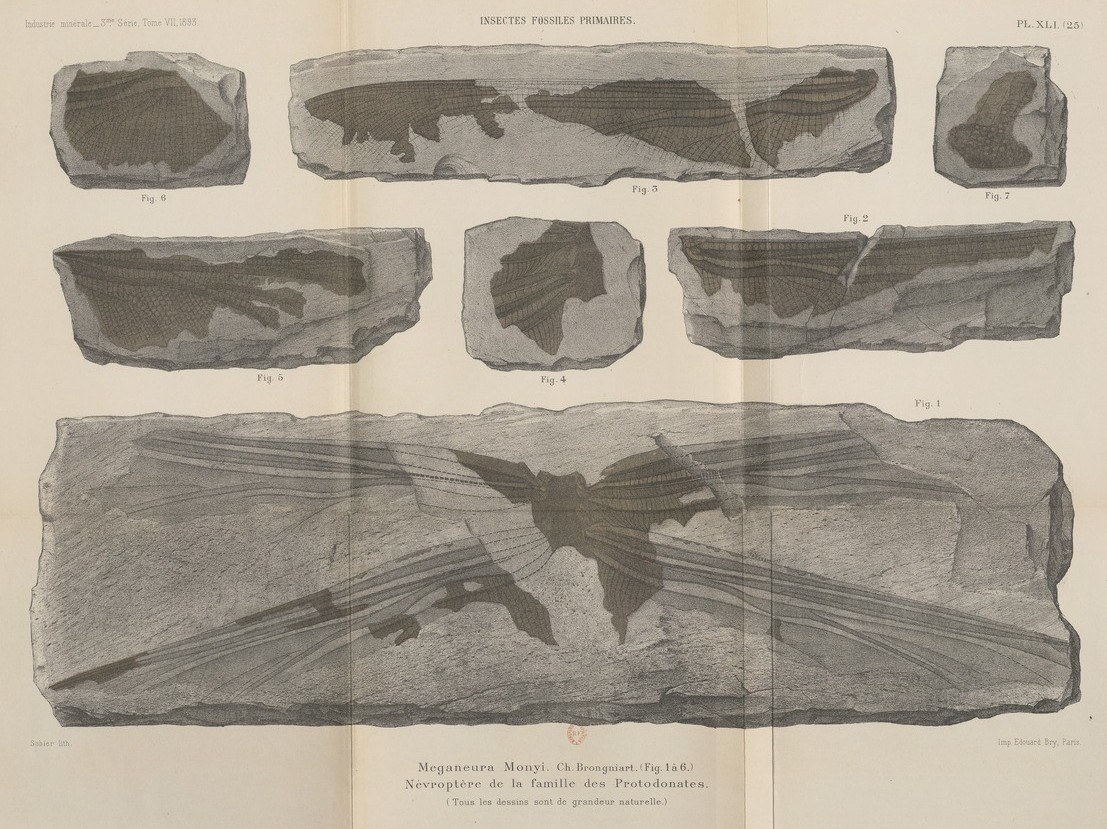
Illustrations of Meganeura monyi fossils in Brongniart's 1894 monograph

Carpenter's revision noted that the illustrations in Brongniart's monograph are rife with artistic license. Broken slabs are illustrated as whole, and the reconstructed complete wing diagram is much broader than the fossils indicate. Handlirsch's species were inspired by subtle differences in the illustrations, and these differences did not hold up to scrutiny once the fossils are inspected in person. Meunier in 1909, and entomologist Auguste Lameere in 1917, doubted the validity of M. fafnir while upholding M. brongniarti, though they disagreed on how to diagnose it. (Note: Meunier (1909)'s perception of "Meganeura brongniarti" was not based on any of Brongniart's fossils. Instead it was inspired by a specimen which Handlirsch (1919) would later name Meganeurina confusa. Carpenter (1943) considered it a species of Meganeurula, while Nel et al. (2009) tentatively treated Meganeurina as a valid genus of tupine meganeurid.) Carpenter went a step further by recognizing that Handlirsch named multiple species for the same individual, broken across part and counterpart slabs. M. aeroplana is the partial counterpart to the original four-winged specimen, M. brongniarti and M. brongniartiana are counterparts to each other, and M. fafnir and M. draco are counterparts to each other. According to Carpenter, all of these fossils, as well as Meunier's specimen, represent a single species: Meganeura monyi.

A few studies have attempted to identify Meganeura fossils outside Commentry, though none are considered valid. In 1914, palaeontologist Herbert Bolton described a large meganeurid wing from the discard heap of Radstock colliery in Somerset, England. He named it Meganeura radstockensis, but Handlirsch in 1919, and all subsequent authors, considered the fossil to belong to its own genus, Boltonites. According to Nel and colleagues in 2009, Meganeura vischerae, from Early Permian Russia, is an indeterminate insect. This also seems to be the case for purported Meganeura fossils from the Pictou Group of Nova Scotia.

== Description ==
=== Size ===
Size of Meganeura monyi compared to a human

With a single-wing length of 32 centimetres (13 in), a wingspan about 65–75 cm (2.13–2.46 ft), and an estimated body length of up to 60–75 cm (1.97–2.46 ft), Meganeura monyi is one of the largest-known flying insect species, five times the length and twice the thoracic width of the largest modern dragonflies. Mass estimates for M. monyi have varied. In 1982, Michael L. May provided a very low mass estimate of 17.8 g (0.039 lb) based on an evaluation of the maximum amount that M. monyi's wing muscles could have lifted, though he did note that the procedure he used may underestimate body mass. In 2002, Gregory S. Paul estimated Meganeura's body mass at around 60 g (0.13 lb). Graham E. Dorrington calculated that the similarly sized Meganeuropsis permiana weighed 34 g (0.075 lb). In 2018, Alan E. R. Cannell contended that May's work yielded a major underestimate. He gave a larger estimate and determined that specimens whose wingspans exceeded 70–75 cm (2.30–2.46 ft) may have had a body mass of 100–150 g (0.22–0.33 lb). According to Cannell, the necessary muscle power would indeed have been present.

=== Anatomy ===
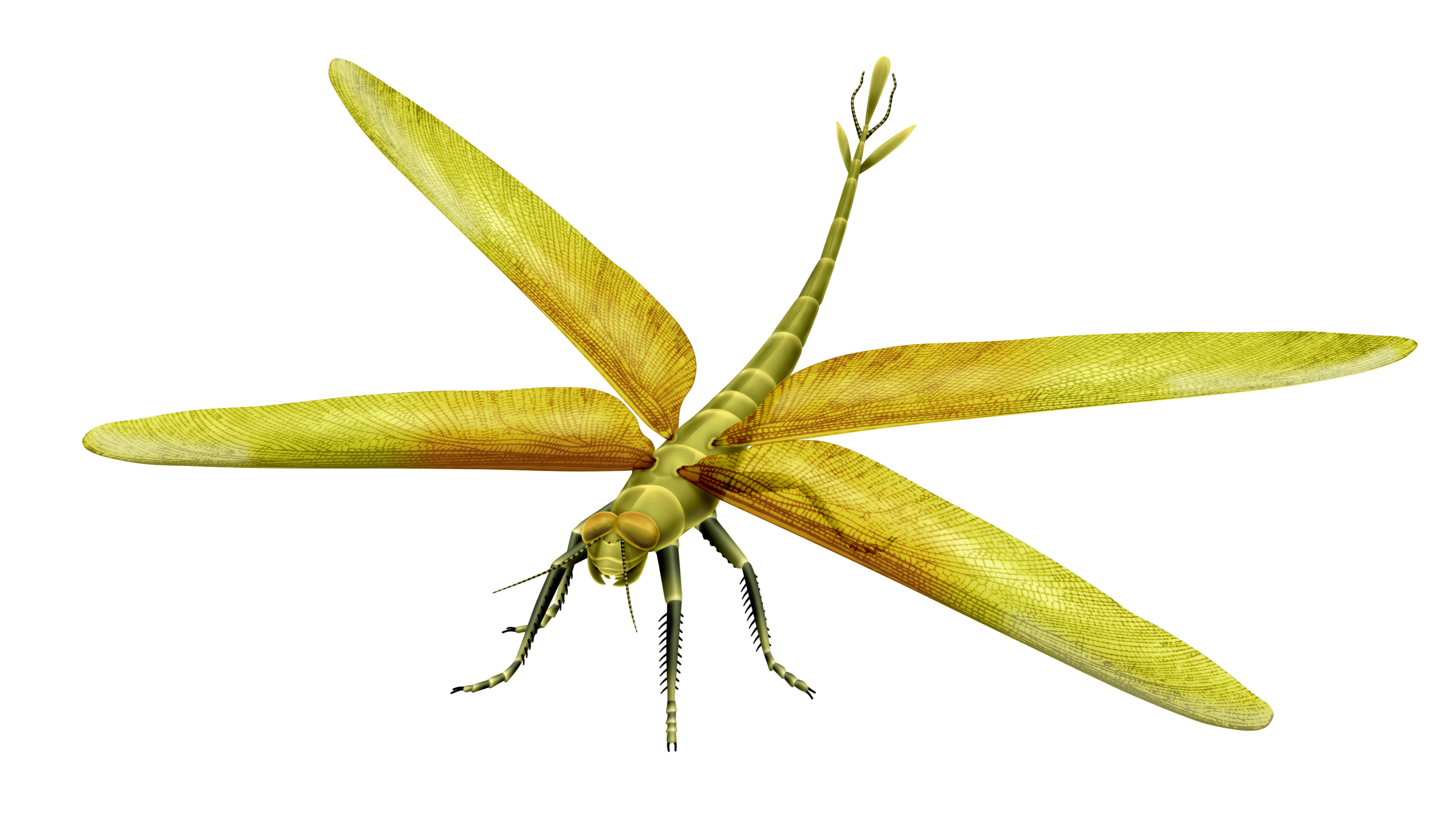
Life restoration of Meganeura monyi

Though Meganeura is the archetypal griffenfly, its overall anatomy is poorly known. Griffenflies as a clade had greatly enlarged compound eyes, which in the case of Meganeurites gracilipes, met along the midline for most of their length; among modern dragonflies, the same is seen in darners and several "libelluloid" clades. The position and morphology of Meganeurites' eyes suggest that griffenflies like Meganeura had extremely good vision and a similar "hawking" ecology to those modern taxa. Unlike modern dragonflies, the thorax and abdomen of M. monyi were roughly equal in thickness. The abdomen was overall long and wide. The wings of M. monyi could be distinguished from those of modern dragonflies by three morphological traits; firstly, the radius of the hindwing was unbranched, whereas that of the forewing bore two veins which emerged closely together; secondly, M. monyi had an unveined precostal area (a short part of the wing between the costal vein and the wing edge); and thirdly, the subcostal veins extended almost to the wingtips. Unlike dragonflies, it and other meganeurids lacked nodal flexion structures on their wings, reducing their mobility. Among griffenflies, its wings were distinguished by a subnodal crossvein which sits distal to the subcosta posterior vein, as in Gallotupus and Tupus; in others, this vein was either basal to the subcosta posterior vein's apex, or opposite to it. Near each wing base was a protuberance or gibbosity, also seen in Sinomeganeura. Unlike modern dragonflies, each of M. monyi's tarsi (the last limb segment) had four joints. The tarsi bore large spines, like those of damselflies and dragonflies, which would have been used for prey capture.

== Classification ==
Meganeura belongs to the Meganisoptera, an order of extinct insects often improperly referred to as giant dragonflies; due to their phylogenetic remoteness and morphological dissimilarity from damselflies and dragonflies (Odonata), the term "griffenflies" (sometimes spelled griffinflies) was proposed for the group by David A. Grimaldi and Michael S. Engel in 2005.

== Paleobiology ==
=== Evolution of large body size ===
Some controversy remains as to how insects of the Carboniferous period were able to grow so large. The way oxygen is diffused through the insect's body via its tracheal breathing system puts an upper limit on body size, which prehistoric insects seem to have well exceeded.

==== High oxygen levels hypothesis ====
Railway engineer Édouard Harlé originally proposed in 1911 that Meganeura was able to fly only because the atmosphere of Earth at that time contained more oxygen than the current 20%. This hypothesis was initially dismissed, though did find some support after further study into the relationship between gigantism and oxygen availability. If this hypothesis is correct, these insects would have been susceptible to falling oxygen levels and certainly could not survive in Earth's modern atmosphere. However, this hypothesis was predicated largely on the idea that insects did not actively breathe. Later research indicates that insects do indeed breathe, with "rapid cycles of tracheal compression and expansion". Recent analysis of the flight energetics of modern insects and birds suggests that both the heightened oxygen levels and air density of the Carboniferous provide an upper bound on size. A general problem with all oxygen-related explanations of giant griffenflies is the fact that very large meganisopterans (Arctotypus sp.) with a wingspan of 45 cm (18 in) also occurred in the Upper Permian of Lodève in France, when the oxygen content of Upper Permian atmosphere was much lower than any other geologic stage. A 2026 study by Edward P. Snelling and colleagues suggested that little correlation exists between body size and atmospheric oxygen content in invertebrates, based on the fact that the space occupied by tracheoles does not significantly differ between small and large species, despite the fact that an increase with body size would likely be advantageous in that it would reduce the diffusion distance for oxygen; if such a correlation existed, then an increase would be expected. Snelling and colleagues therefore concluded that probably no connection can be made between diffusive oxygen transport mechanisms and a large body size.

==== Air dominance hypothesis ====
As such, other explanations for the large size of meganeurids compared to living relatives have been put forward. In 2004, paleontologist Günter Bechly suggested that the lack of aerial vertebrate predators allowed pterygote insects to evolve to maximum sizes during the Carboniferous and Permian periods, perhaps accelerated by an evolutionary arms race for increase in body size between plant-feeding Palaeodictyoptera and Meganisoptera as their predators. In Bechly's model, the evolution of flying tetrapods such as pterosaurs, which were more agile and less restricted by drag, may have provided a predatorial threat that the giant insects of the Palaeozoic could not overcome.

The diversification of true odonatans in the Mesozoic may correspond to the extinction of meganisopterans around the time of the Permian-Triassic extinction event.

=== Flight mechanics ===
Given the absence of nodal flexion structures, Meganeura and other large griffenflies likely were not as aerially adept as damselflies or dragonflies, and they were probably incapable of the abrupt turns modern species can execute. The wingspans of certain taxa (such as Meganeurites) may have further hindered their mobility. In 2018, Alan E. R. Cannell suggested that Meganeura's wings may have beat at a frequency of 3 Hz; the largest modern dragonfly in terms of overall dimensions, Petalura ingentissima, has a wingbeat of 18 Hz. Cannell suggested that due to its size and capacity for air flow, and to avoid overheating, Meganeura may have spent much of its time perching to oxygenate its tissues, flying in short bursts. He did, however, note that differences in atmospheric media could have alleviated these issues (see below).

=== Thermoregulation ===
In 1982, Michael L. May wrote on the difficulty that meganisopterans such as Meganeura would have faced with thermoregulation. May suggested three hypotheses. Firstly, he proposed that meganisopterans may have been crepuscular, hunting before sunrise and after sunset. Secondly, he suggested that heat production may have been interrupted by occasional switches from powered flight to gliding. Thirdly, he suggested that they may have evolved endothermy (the regulation of a constant metabolic rate to maintain a steady body temperature). By maintaining a relatively high internal body temperature while augmenting cooling rates through by increasing the circulation of haemolymph between the thorax and abdomen (as in modern damselflies and dragonflies), a meganisopteran could have achieved the relatively high body temperature required to sufficiently power its flight muscles whilst avoiding overheating. However, Alan E. R. Cannell noted in 2018 that the crepuscular hypothesis is likely not viable, given that ambient temperatures in tropical environments remain high at night, and a sight-oriented predator such as Meganeura would face great difficulty hunting in low-light conditions. Further, he contended that the third hypothesis was unlikely given that it would have been constrained by respiratory air flow. Cannell suggested that the higher oxygen levels (and thus air density, 1.5–1.6 bar as opposed to ~1 bar in the present day) of the Carboniferous may have both provided an adequate oxygen supply for constant flight and meant that less muscular power was required for flight than would be the case today. With less energy being invested into wing flapping, Meganeura will have produced far less body heat and will have been at a reduced risk of overheating, despite the relatively high thermal inertia implied by its thick body.

== Paleoecology ==
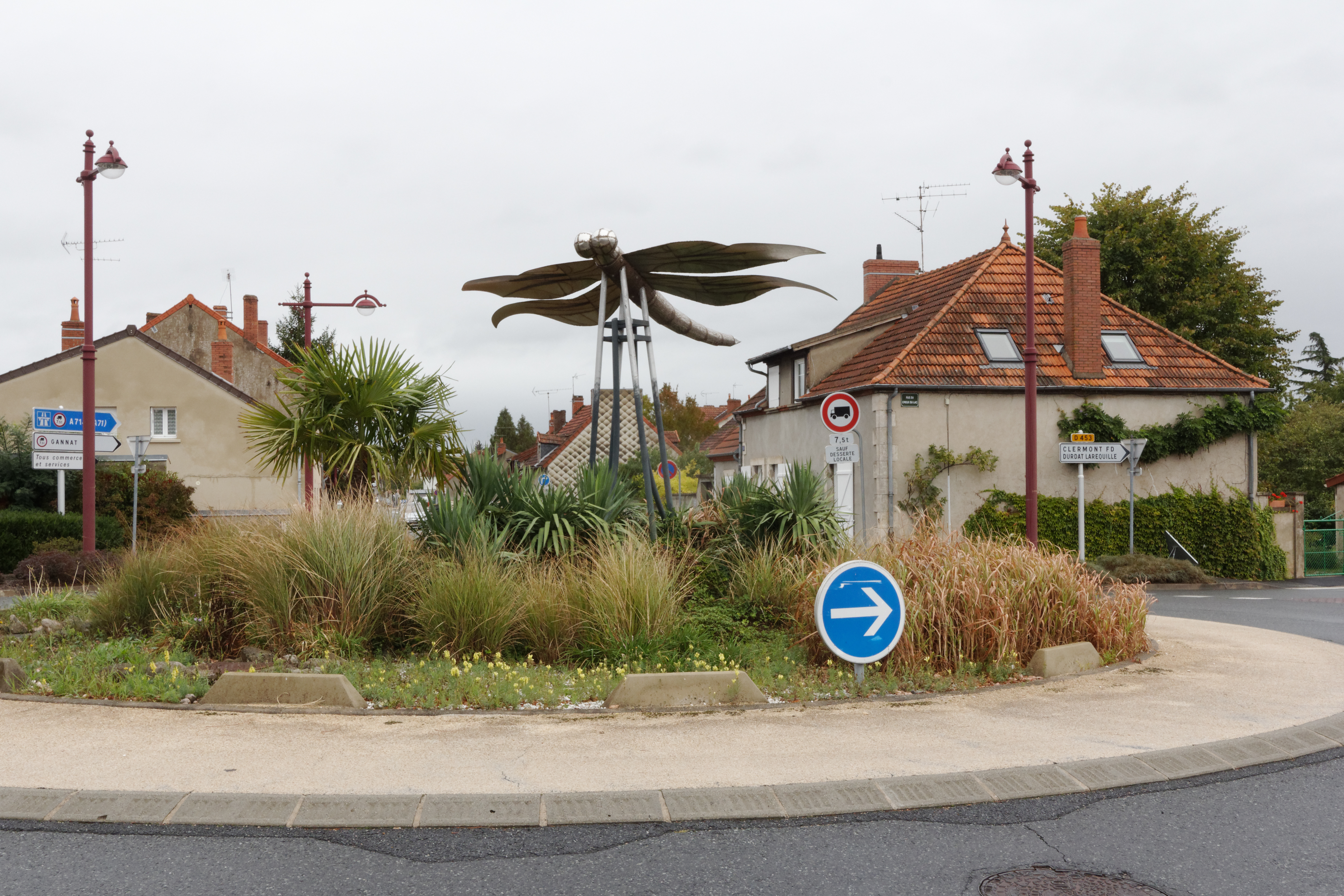
Meganeura sculpture in Commentry, France

Research on close relatives Meganeurula and Meganeurites suggest that Meganeura was adapted to open habitats and similar in behaviour to extant hawkers. It may have patrolled open forests, including above the canopy, and waterside environments such as lakes and rivers for prey. The eyes of Meganeura were likely enlarged relative to body size. Meganeura had spines on the tibia and tarsi sections of the legs, which would have functioned as a "flying trap" to capture prey.

Meganeura is one of many insects recovered from coal mines on the outskirts of Commentry, France. Commentry was a major component of France's 19th century coal industry, but it also gained renown among paleontologists as one of the best sources of Carboniferous insect fossils in the world. The fossils of Commentry are from the Gzhelian stage of the Carboniferous, about 304 to 299 million years ago. Also known from Commentry is Meganeurites, on which Meganeura may have predated. The giant myriapod Arthropleura is also known from the Commentry Shales.

== See also ==
- List of largest insects
