= Flachat =

Flachat (English: /flæˈʃɑː/, French: [flaʃa]) is a French surname. Notable people with the surname include:

- Eugène Flachat (1802–1873), French civil engineer
- Stéphane Flachat (1800–1884), French engineer, businessman, Saint-Simonian, and politician
