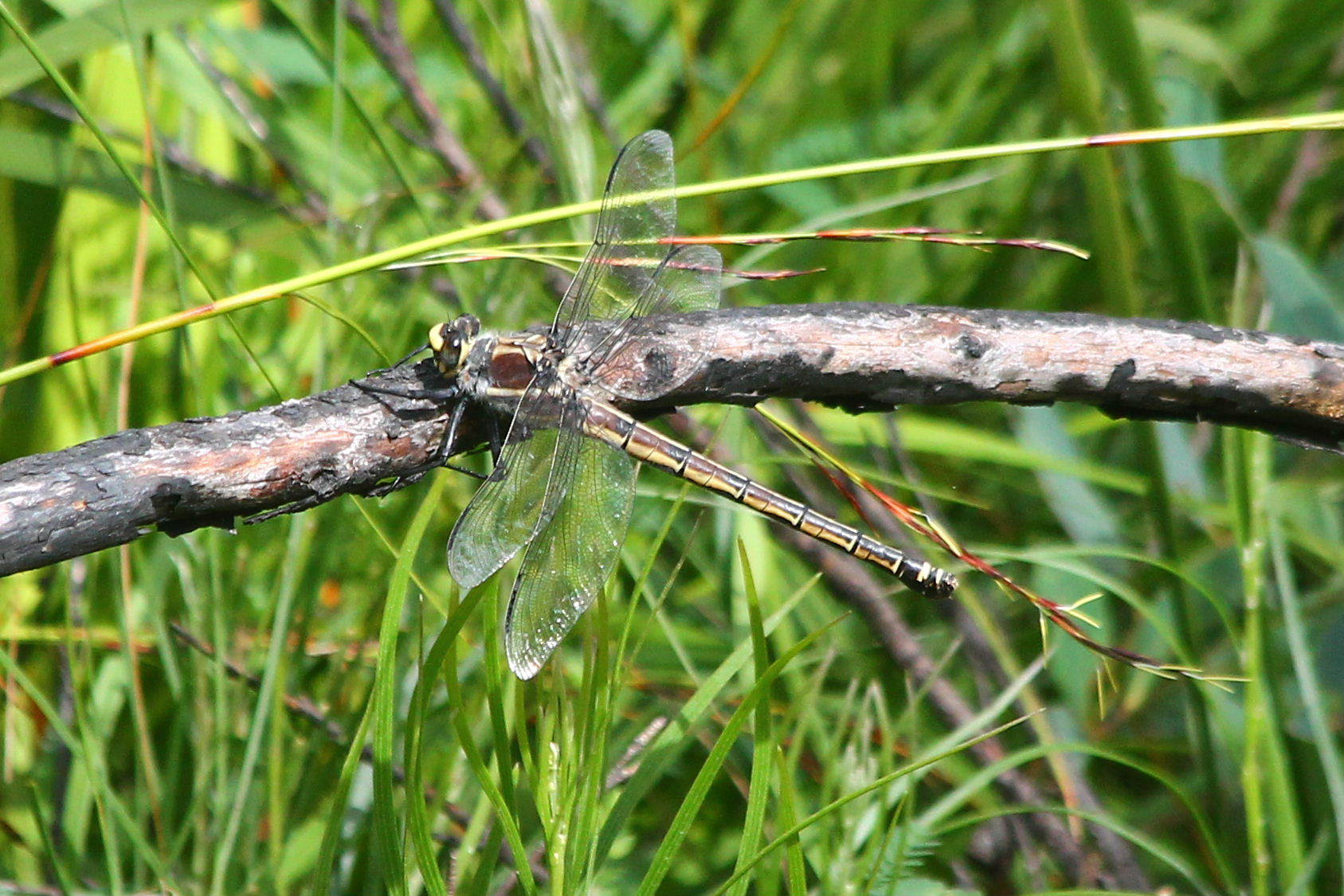

Scientific classification
- Kingdom: Animalia
- Phylum: Arthropoda
- Clade: Pancrustacea
- Class: Insecta
- Order: Odonata
- Suborder: Anisoptera
- Family: Petaluridae
- Genus: Petalura
- Species: P. gigantea

Binomial name
- Petalura gigantea Leach, 1815

= Petalura gigantea =

Species of dragonfly

Petalura gigantea, the giant dragonfly or south-eastern petaltail, is a species of dragonfly in the family Petaluridae from southeastern Australia. Males have body length of 6–7.5 cm (2.4–3.0 in) and a wingspan up to 11 cm (4.3 in), while females have body length of 8–9 cm (3.1–3.5 in) and a wingspan up to 12.5 cm (4.9 in). This makes it a very large species of dragonfly, although it is exceeded by a few other species, including the closely related northeast Australian giant petaltail (P. ingentissima).

The giant dragonfly occurs along the east coast of New South Wales, ranging from the northern part of the state to the Victorian border region, and is not found west of the Great Dividing Range. There are known occurrences in the Blue Mountains and Southern Highlands, in the Clarence River catchment, and on a few coastal swamps from north of Grafton to Nadgee in the south. The giant dragonfly is listed as endangered under the New South Wales Threatened Species Conservation Act. This listing was transferred to the equivalent schedules under the Biodiversity Conservation Act 2016 (NSW) from August 2017.

The giant dragonfly is unusual not only in size, but also in having predominantly terrestrial habits at the larval stage. It usually rests in sedges or shrubs while in mating and this usually occurs within a wetland area or an ecosystem based on peat (the accumulation of decayed vegetation or organic matter).

== Etymology ==
The genus name Petalura is derived from the Greek πέταλον (petalon, "leaf") and οὐρά (oura, "tail"), referring to the leaf-shaped appendages.

The species name gigantea is derived from the Latin giganteus ("gigantic"), referring to its very large size.

== Gallery ==
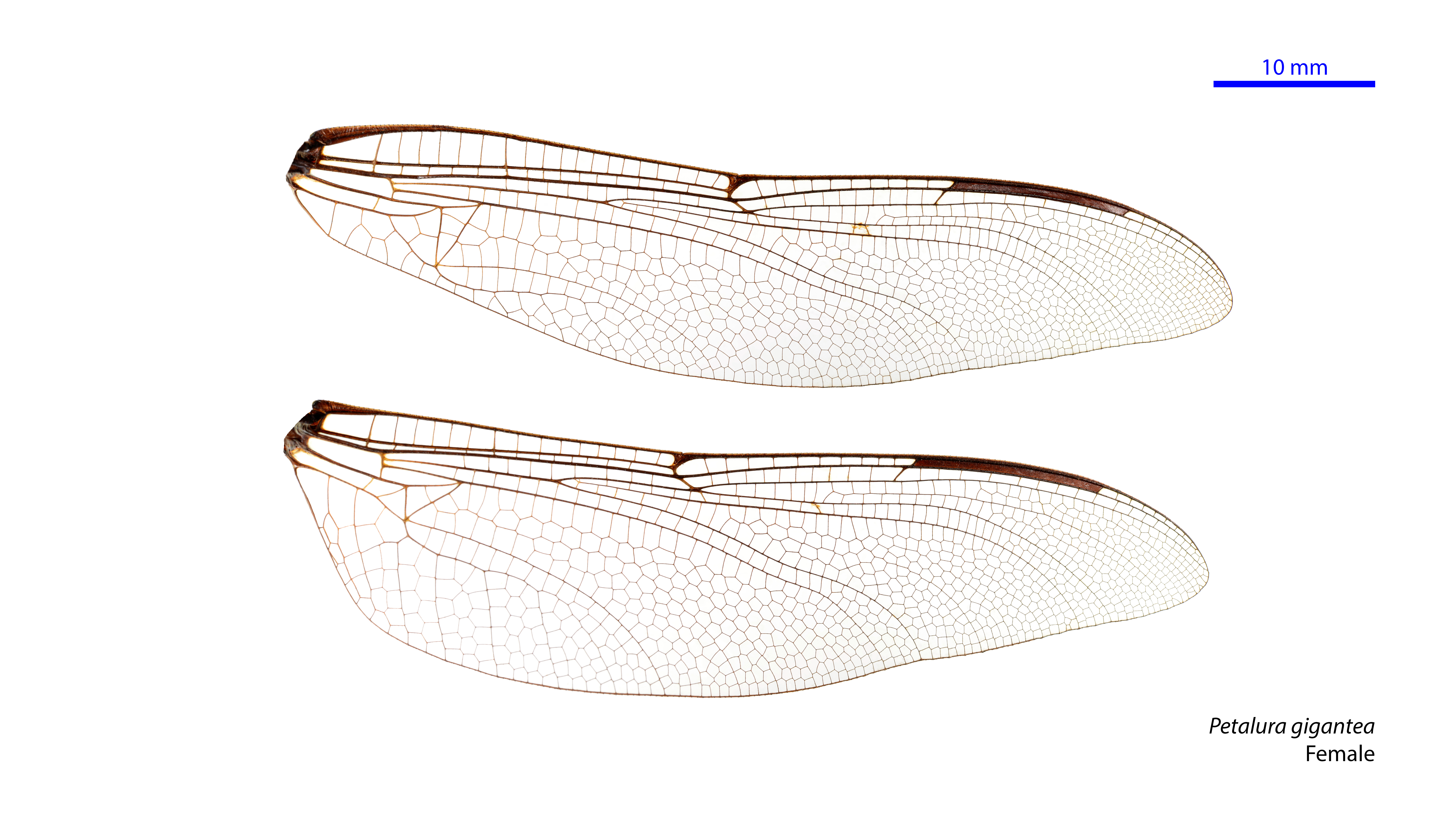
Female wings

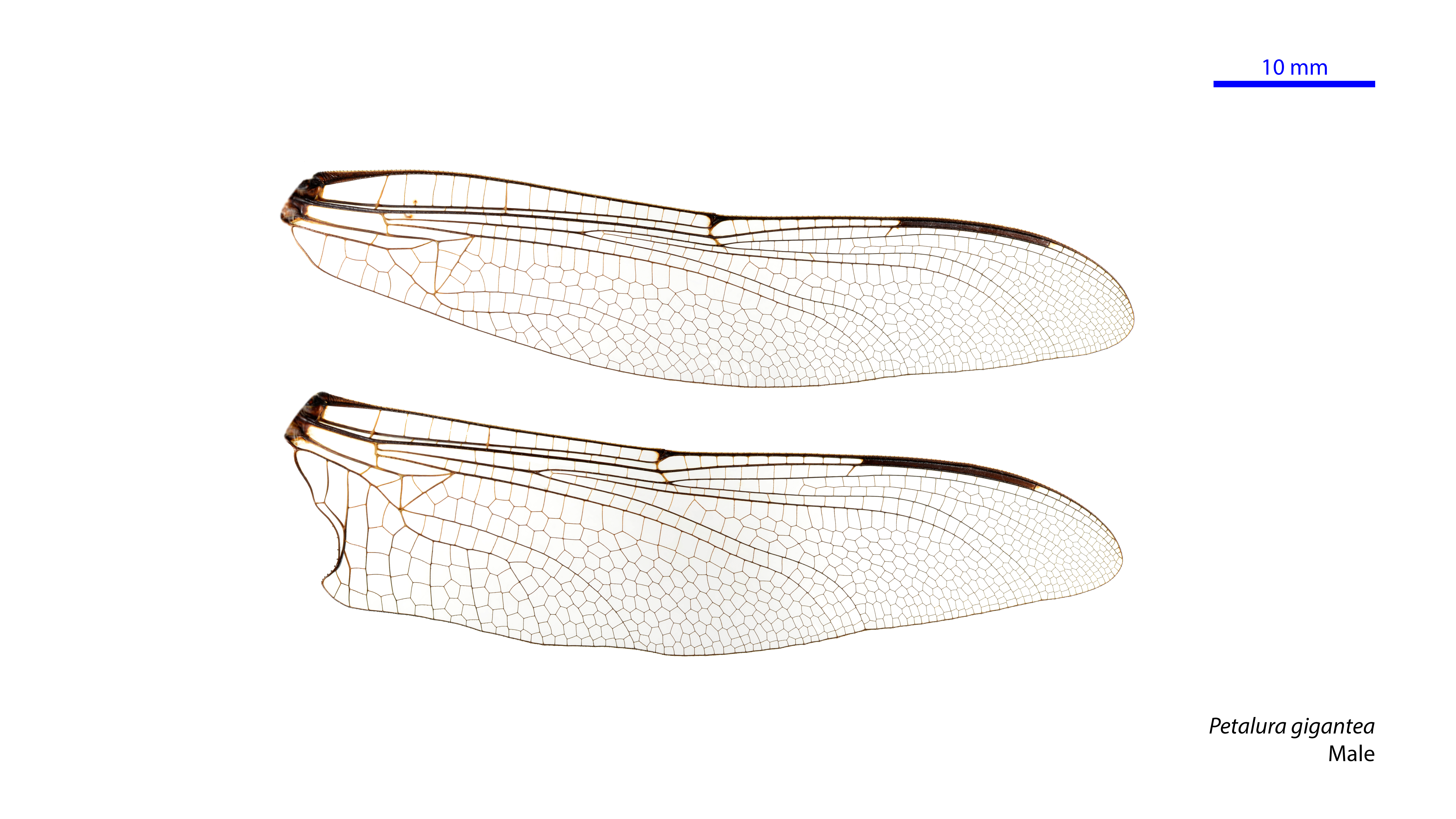
Male wings

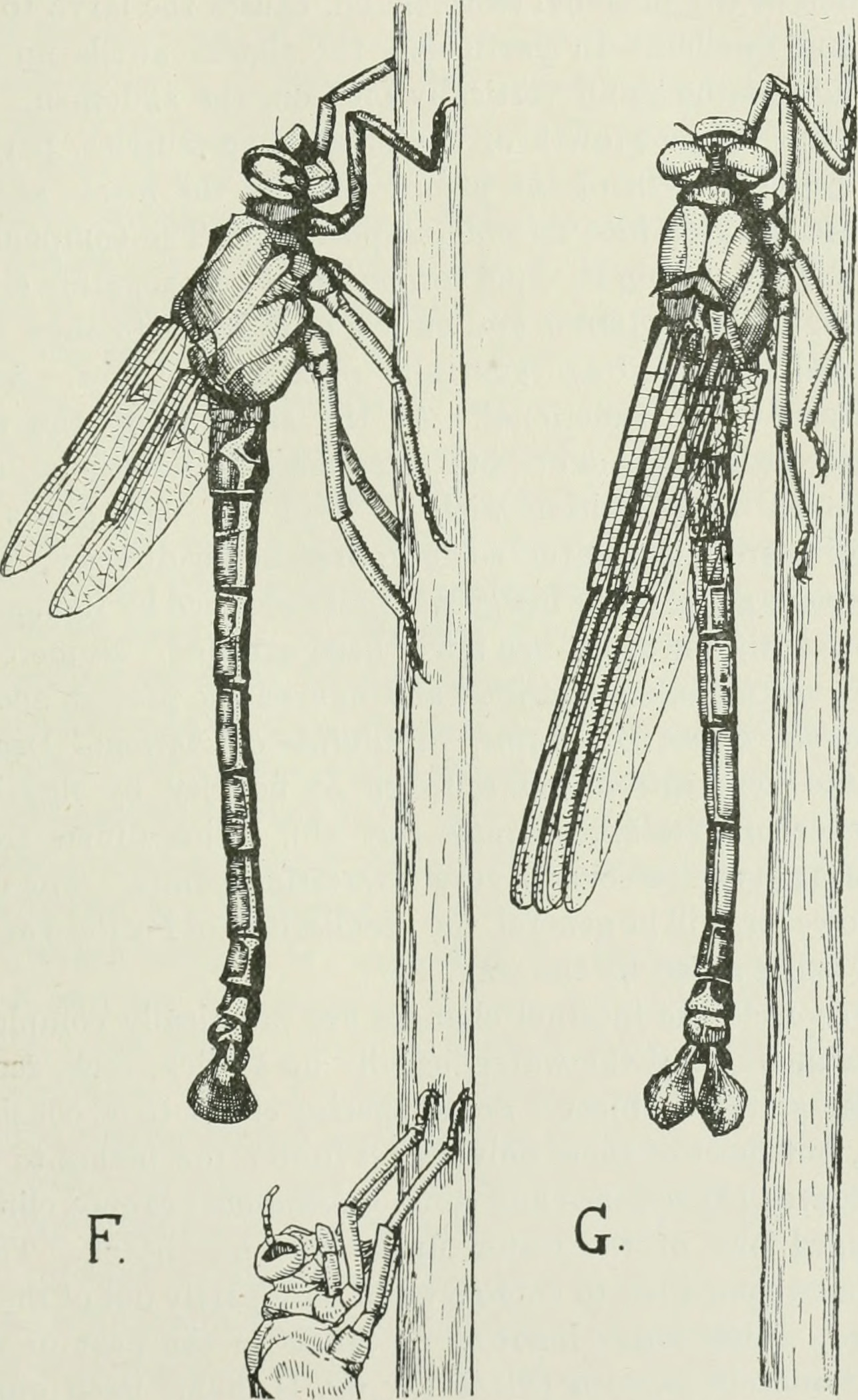
Last stages of metamorphosis

== See also ==
- List of Odonata species of Australia
