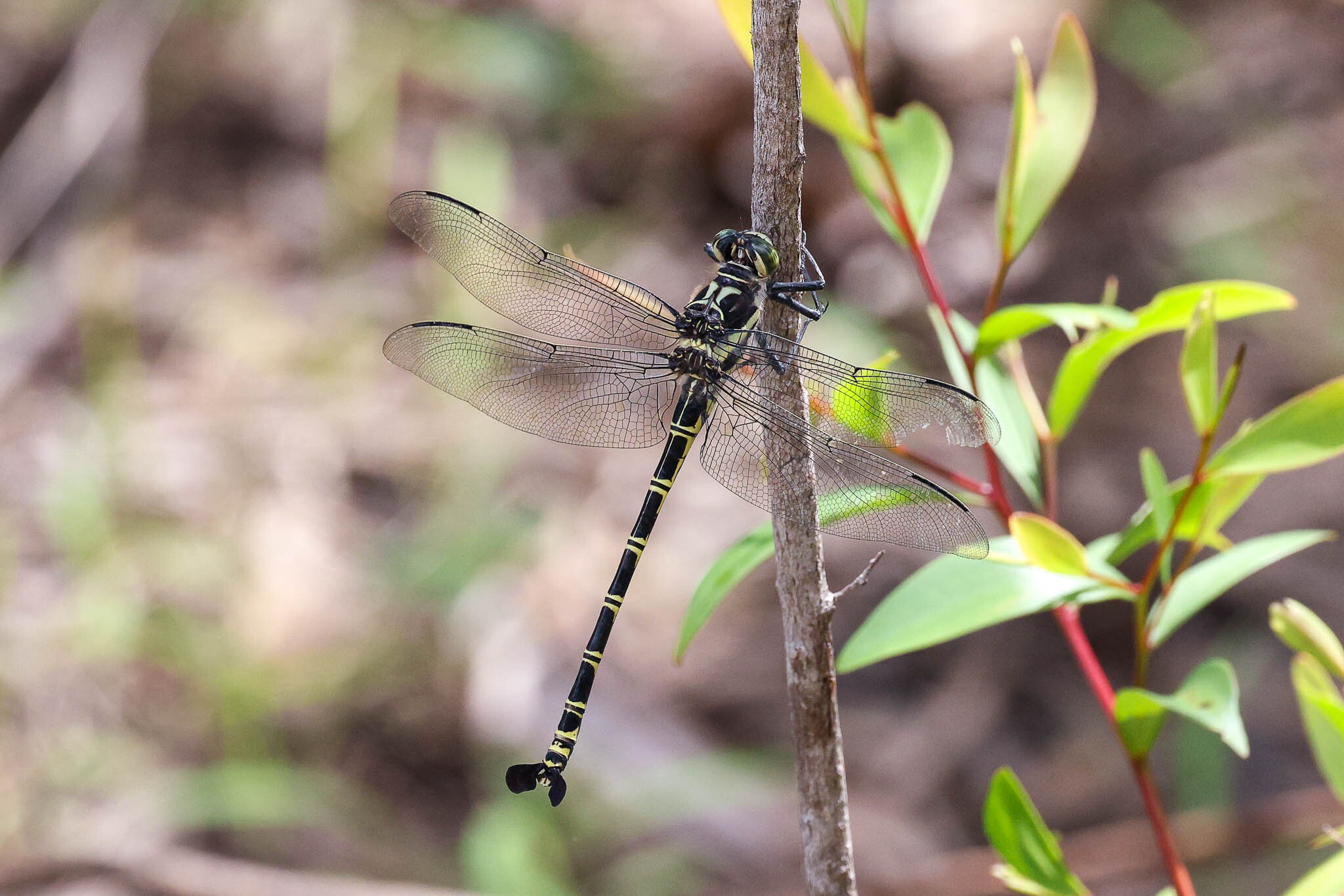

Conservation status
- Vulnerable (IUCN 3.1)

Scientific classification
- Kingdom: Animalia
- Phylum: Arthropoda
- Clade: Pancrustacea
- Class: Insecta
- Order: Odonata
- Suborder: Anisoptera
- Family: Petaluridae
- Genus: Petalura
- Species: P. pulcherrima

Binomial name
- Petalura pulcherrima Tillyard, 1913

= Petalura pulcherrima =

Beautiful petaltail

Species of dragonfly

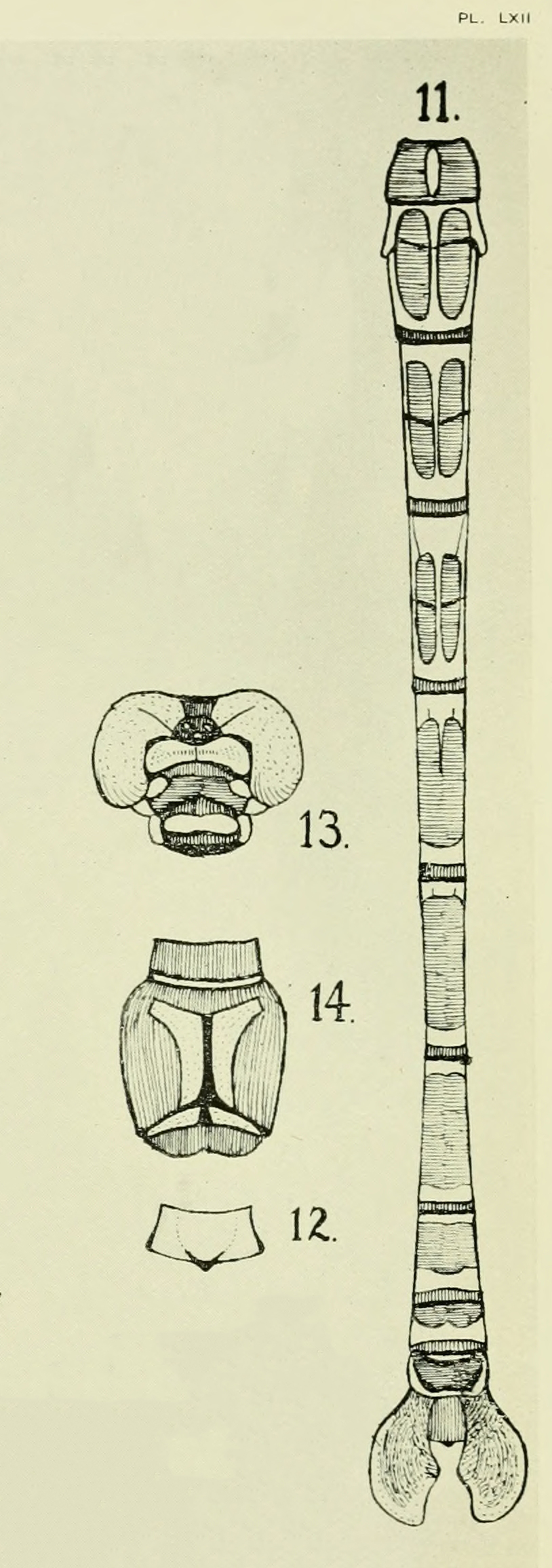
Original drawings by R.J. Tillyard: 11. Colour pattern of abdomen; 12. Inferior appendage from below; 13. Colour pattern of head from in front; 14. Colour pattern of thorax from above

Petalura pulcherrima is a species of Australian dragonfly in the family Petaluridae, commonly known as a beautiful petaltail. It is a very large and slender dragonfly, mostly black or dark brown with yellow markings and its eyes widely separated on top of its head. It has clear wings and a very long, narrow pterostigma.

Petalura pulcherrima is endemic to coastal rainforests and monsoon-forest streams of Cape York in Queensland, Australia. Like other species of the genus Petalura, its larvae live in burrows beside rainforest streams, with an opening above water level.

Petalura pulcherrima appears similar to Petalura ingentissima which is larger still and is also found in coastal north-eastern Queensland.

Petalura pulcherrima is rarely seen. The IUCN Red List considers it to be a vulnerable species, with fragmentation of its habitat by human interference a major factor.

== Etymology ==
The genus name Petalura is derived from the Greek πέταλον (petalon, "leaf") and οὐρά (oura, "tail"), referring to the leaf-shaped appendages.

The species name pulcherrima is the superlative form of the Latin pulcher ("beautiful"), hence "most beautiful".

== See also ==
- List of Odonata species of Australia
