= Jean Bayet =

French Latinist (1892–1969)

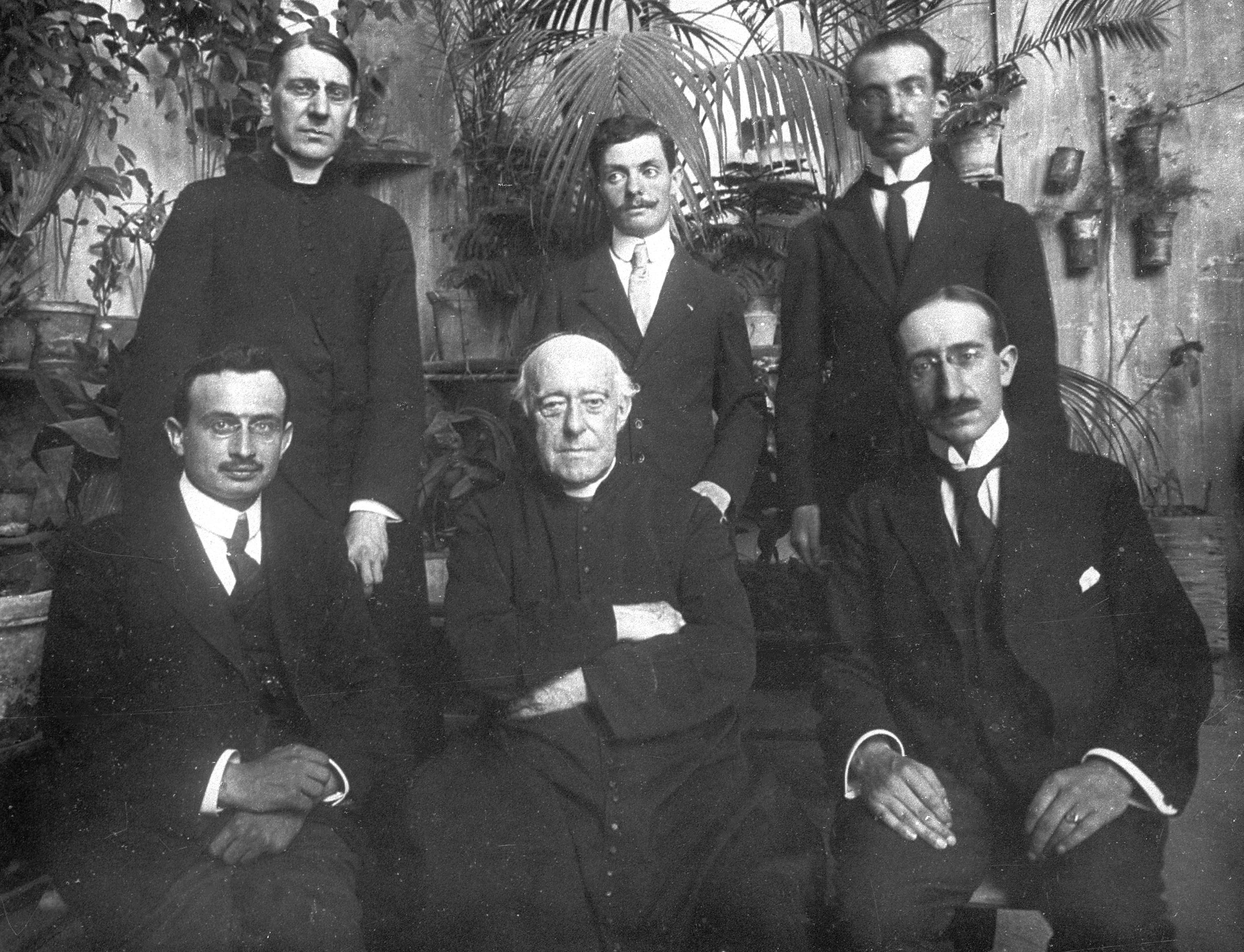
- Jean Bayet, left in the front row. Louis Duchesne and students at the Ecole Française de Rome in 1919-1920.
- Born: Jean Alexis Bayet; 12 November 1892; Versailles
- Died: 5 December 1969 (aged 77); Paris
- Occupations: Latinist; Professor

Jean Bayet (12 November 1892 – 5 December 1969) was a French Latinist. A Professor of Latin Language and Literature at the Sorbonne, he was Director-General of Education in 1944 and Director of the École française de Rome from 1952 to 1960. In 1948 he was elected a member of the Académie des inscriptions et belles-lettres. A specialist of Latin literature and Religion in ancient Rome, Jean Bayet, through his works and the theses he directed, played a decisive role in the development of a French school of history of the Roman religion, particularly active in the second half of the twentieth century.

== Biography ==
His grandfather was mayor of Commentry Allier from 1871 to 1873. His mother, Louise Villain, was the daughter of Isaac Villain (1830–1907) deputy mayor of Sedan at the end of the 19th century.

François Bayet, his son, died in deportation.

As a child he was overwhelmed with an infirmity in his legs, which made walking painful and made him suffer all his life; he had to give up the military career his father had followed.

He entered the École normale supérieure in 1912, obtained his agrégation of letters and was a member of the École française de Rome from 1917 to 1920.

In 1915, he was awarded one of the Montyon Prizes by the Académie française and the Marcelin-Guérin Prize in 1933.

He taught first in secondary education (at the Lycée Charlemagne and the Lycée de Laon), while continuing the preparation of his doctoral theses on Les Origines de l'Hercule romain and the critical study of the main monuments related to the Etruscan Hercules, which he defended in 1926. He was then appointed to the Faculty of Arts of Caen, before moving to the Sorbonne in 1932.

At the Liberation of France, he was appointed Director-General of Education and took part in the work of the commission Langevin-Wallon.

He was elected a member of the Académie des Inscriptions et Belles-Lettres 3 December 1948. He was also a member of the Accademia dei Lincei and of the Pontificia Accademia Romana di Archeologia.

Jean Bayet was director of the École française de Rome from 1952 to 1960 (where he succeeded Albert Grenier and was in turn succeeded by Pierre Boyancé). In 1954-1955, he presided the Unione internazionale degli Istituti di archeologia, storia e storia dell'arte in Roma.

Upon his return, he retired (1961). His last years were obscured by the disease which gradually froze him in immobility.

== Works (selection) ==
- 1926: Les Origines de l'Hercule romain (« Bibliothèque des Écoles françaises d'Athènes et de Rome », n° 132), Paris, E. de Boccard
- 1934: Littérature latine. Histoire, pages choisies, Paris, Armand Colin; numerous reprints.
- 1957: Histoire politique et psychologique de la religion romaine, Paris, Payot; numerous reprints.

== Sources ==
- Christophe Charle, Les Professeurs de la Faculté des lettres de Paris : dictionnaire biographique, 1909-1939, Paris, Éd. du CNRS, 1986. ISBN 2-222-03872-3
- Georges Rougeron, Les Bourbonnais à l'Institut de France (an IV-1965), Moulins, 1966.
- Michel Lejeune, « Éloge funèbre de M. Jean Bayet, académicien ordinaire », Comptes rendus des séances de l'Académie des inscriptions et belles-lettres, 113e année, n° 4, 1969, p. 609-612. online.
- Pierre Boyancé, "Jean Bayet, directeur de l'École Française de Rome (1952-1960)", Mélanges d'archéologie et d'histoire, 82, 1970. p. 9-14. online.
