= Petalura litorea =

Coastal petaltail

Conservation status
- Near Threatened (IUCN 3.1)

Scientific classification
- Kingdom: Animalia
- Phylum: Arthropoda
- Clade: Pancrustacea
- Class: Insecta
- Order: Odonata
- Suborder: Anisoptera
- Family: Petaluridae
- Genus: Petalura
- Species: P. litorea

Binomial name
- Petalura litorea Theischinger, 1999

Species of dragonfly

Petalura litorea, commonly known as the coastal petaltail, is an endangered Australian species of dragonfly from the family Petaluridae.

This species originates from south-eastern Queensland and prefers swamp land with thick vegetation, often residing on sword grass. The endangered species description is currently recorded in the New South Wales government Endangered Species listing.

== Body ==
Coastal petaltails have distinctive bodies that are unique to their species. The average petaltail has a body around 10 cm (4 in) in length, with wide-set eyes and a black thorax covered in yellow spots; the abdomen follows a similar pattern consisting of black and yellow stripes. Petaltails' pterostigmata are long and thin, running to and from either side of their wings. Female petaltails have rounded wings, while male petaltails have angular wings.

== Mating ==
Male coastal petaltails have unique, bright orange anal appendages called 'petaltails' that are believed to be used to attract a mate. Once a mate has been attracted, the male and female begin mating, the female positioned upwards towards the sky, and the male in an upside down fashion, lasting for an average of thirty minutes. Once the male and female are finished, the female goes off to lay her eggs in a burrow, often near a body of water. Larvae that nest in these caves often are subject to attack from underwater predators that can easily access the burrow from a nearby body of water. If the larvae survive the incubation process the average coastal petaltail's lifespan is approximately 6 years.

== Etymology ==
The genus name Petalura is derived from the Greek πέταλον (petalon, "leaf") and οὐρά (oura, "tail"), referring to the leaf-shaped appendages.

The species name litorea is derived from the Latin litoreus ("belonging to the shore" or "coastal"), possibly referring to the coastal distribution of the species.

== Gallery ==
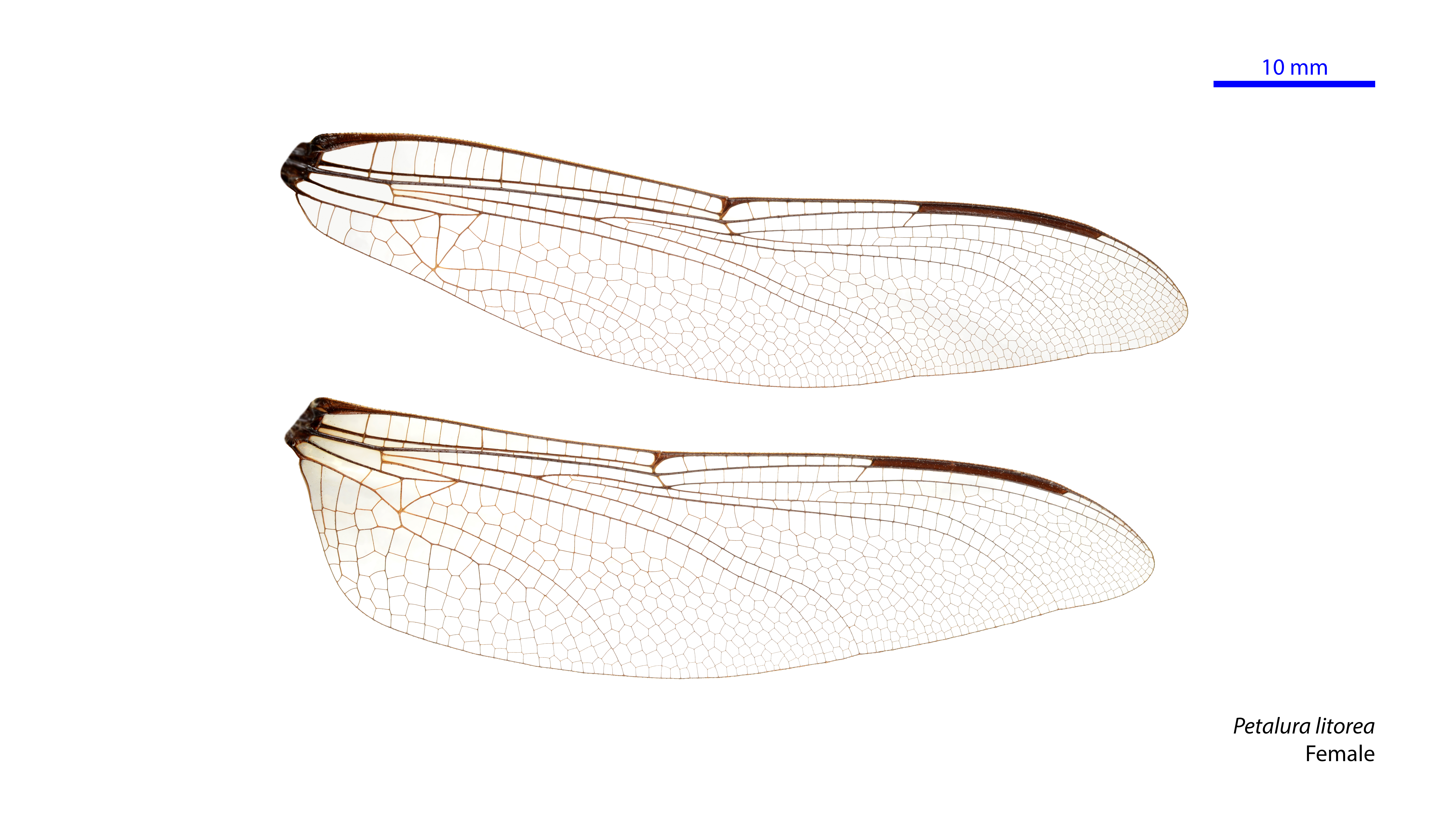
Female wings

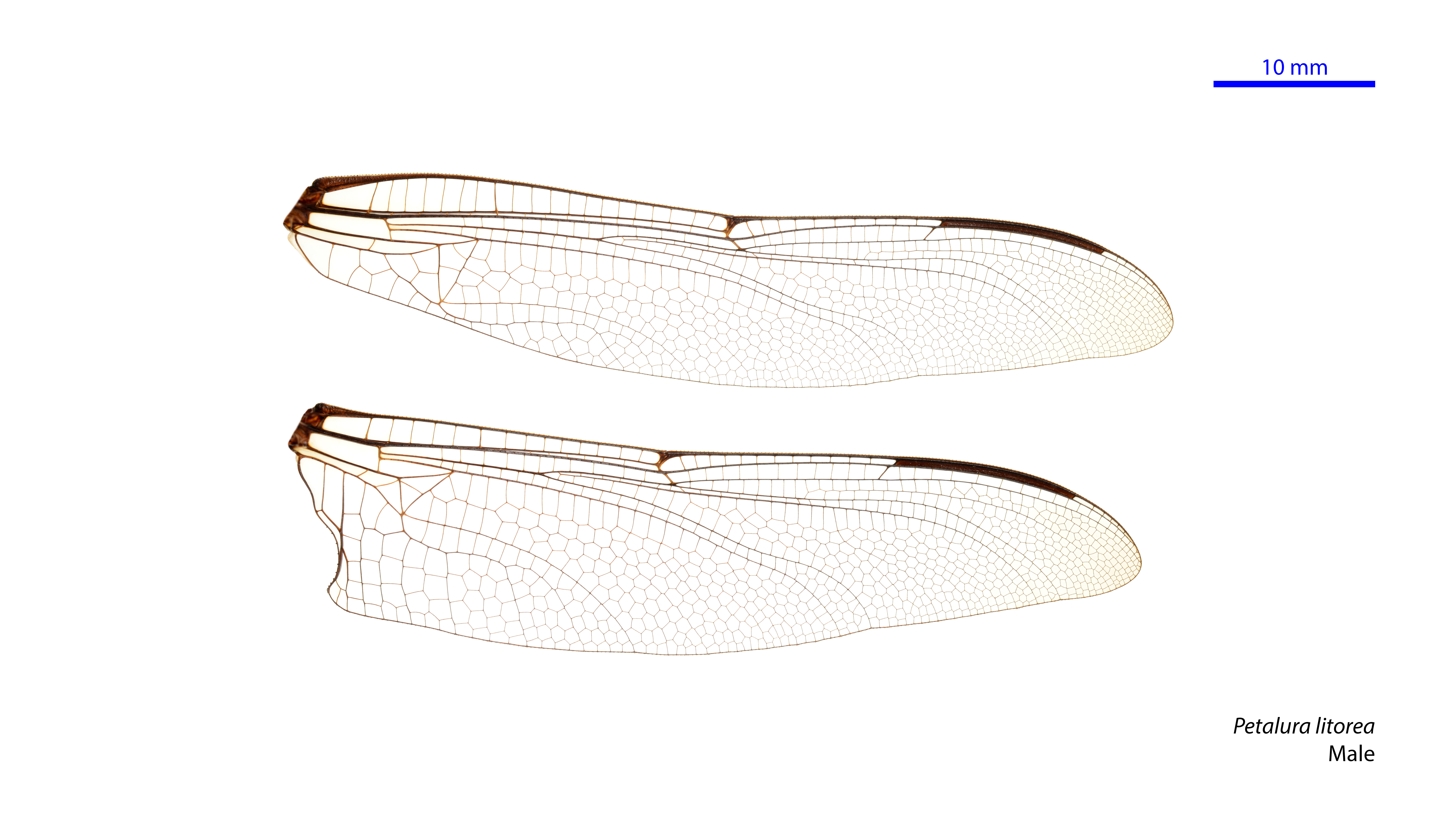
Male wings

== See also ==
- List of Odonata species of Australia
