= Commentry =

- Commune
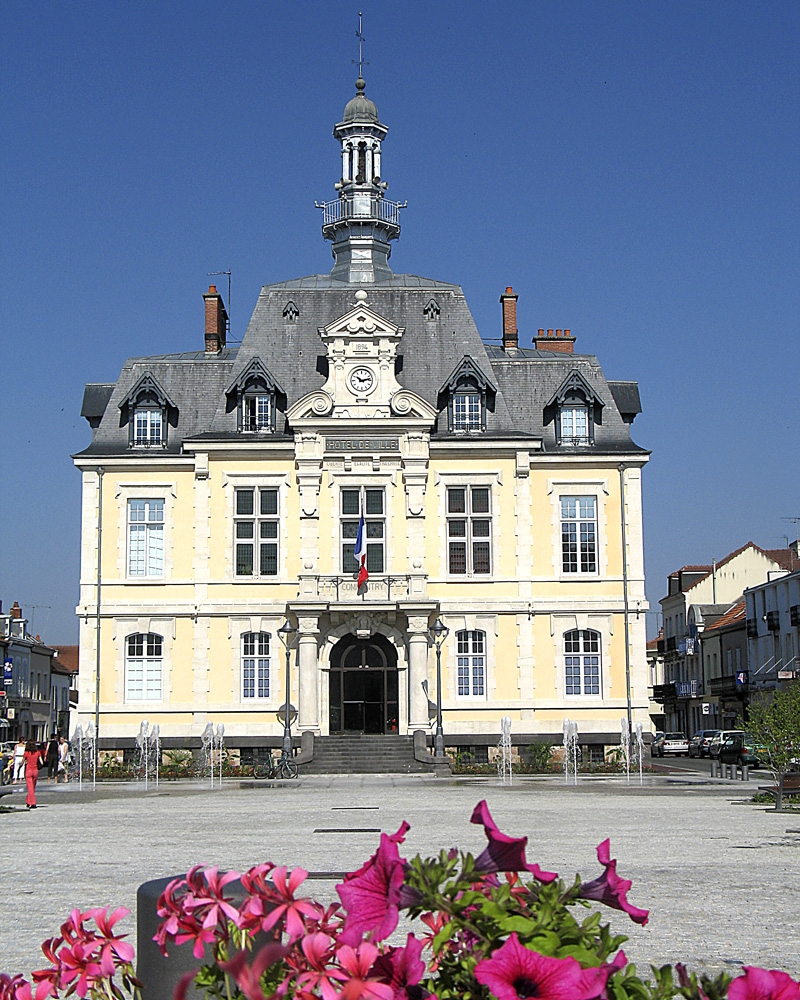
- Town hall

- Coat of arms
- Location of Commentry
- Location within France Location within Auvergne-Rhône-Alpes
- Coordinates: 46°17′23″N 2°44′32″E
- Country: France
- Region: Auvergne-Rhône-Alpes
- Department: Allier
- Arrondissement: Montluçon
- Canton: Commentry
- Intercommunality: Commentry Montmarault Néris Communauté

Government
  - Mayor (2026–32): Sylvain Bourdier
- Area^{1}: 20.96 km^{2} (8.09 sq mi)
- Elevation: 385 m (1,263 ft)
- Highest elevation: 462 m (1,516 ft)
- Lowest elevation: 332 m (1,089 ft)
- Population (2023): 6,017
  - Density: 287.1/km^{2} (743.5/sq mi)
- Time zone: UTC+01:00 (CET)
  - Summer (DST): UTC+02:00 (CEST)
- INSEE/Postal code: 03082 /03600
- ^{1} French Land Register data, which excludes lakes, ponds, glaciers > 1 km^{2} (0.386 sq mi or 247 acres) and river estuaries.

Commentry (French pronunciation: [kɔmɑ̃tʁi]; Auvergnat: Comentriac; Marchois: Comentric) is a commune in the department of Allier in central France. It lies 42 miles (68 km) southwest of Moulins in the valley of the Œil. It is within 8 km of one of the geographic centres of France. The film actress Yvonne Rozille (1900–1985) was born in Commentry.

== Population ==
Historical population

Year	Pop.	±% p.a.
1793	600	—
1800	498	−2.63%
1806	565	+2.13%
1821	601	+0.41%
1831	1,277	+7.83%
1836	1,126	−2.49%
1841	1,424	+4.81%
1846	3,015	+16.19%
1851	5,465	+12.63%
1856	8,484	+9.19%
1861	8,582	+0.23%
1866	9,978	+3.06%
1872	11,698	+2.69%
1876	12,978	+2.63%
1881	12,416	−0.88%
1886	12,515	+0.16%
1891	12,618	+0.16%
1896	12,632	+0.02%
1901	11,169	−2.43%

Year	Pop.	±% p.a.
1906	10,205	−1.79%
1911	10,112	−0.18%
1921	10,256	+0.14%
1926	10,089	−0.33%
1931	10,136	+0.09%
1936	8,827	−2.73%
1946	9,119	+0.33%
1954	9,259	+0.19%
1962	9,711	+0.60%
1968	10,026	+0.53%
1975	10,043	+0.02%
1982	9,195	−1.25%
1990	8,021	−1.69%
1999	7,204	−1.19%
2007	6,803	−0.71%
2012	6,592	−0.63%
2017	6,239	−1.09%
2023	6,017	−0.60%

Source: EHESS and INSEE (1968-2023)

== History ==
Commentry was home to Compagnie de Commentry-Fourchambault-Decazeville, thanks to an important coal deposit. The coal mine fueled a huge growth in population, from under 1,000 to more than 12,000, while Stéphane Mony was its CEO (1840–1884). Commentry was the first commune ever to elect a socialist mayor: Christophe Thivrier was elected 6 June 1882.

During the repression of January and February 1894, the police conducted raids targeting the anarchists living there, without much success.

The Socialist Party of France was founded in Commentry in September 1902.

== Economy ==
Commentry gave its name to a coal field over 21 square kilometres in extent, and historically had important foundries and forges.

== Science ==
Charles Brongniart discovered many fossils near Commentry, including Meganeura in the Stephanian stage coal measures in 1880.

== Personalities ==
- Jean Bayet (1882–1969) Professor of Latin Language and Literature at the Sorbonne, whose grandfather Gilbert Bayet was mayor of Commentry 1871–1873.
- Henri Fayol (1841–1925) mining engineer, developed Fayolism, an approach to management and administration.
- Abel Gance (1889–1981) film director and producer, raised by maternal grandparents in Commentry until the age of eight.
- Jacques Hillairet (1886–1984) historian specializing in the history of Paris, officer of the Legion of Honour.
- Émile Mâle (1862–1954) art historian and member of the Académie française.
- Stéphane Mony (1800–1884) Engineer, director of the colliery at Commentry; mayor from 1854 to 1883; deputy from 1868 to 1871.
- Christophe Thivrier (1841–1895) first elected Socialist mayor in France.
- Roger Vergé (1930–2015) Celebrated chef and restaurateur.

== See also ==
- Communes of the Allier department
