= Petalura hesperia =

Scientific classification
- Kingdom: Animalia
- Phylum: Arthropoda
- Clade: Pancrustacea
- Class: Insecta
- Order: Odonata
- Suborder: Anisoptera
- Family: Petaluridae
- Genus: Petalura
- Species: P. hesperia

Binomial name
- Petalura hesperia Watson, 1958

Species of dragonfly

Petalura hesperia, more commonly known as the western petaltail or giant western dragonfly, is a species of dragonfly in the family Petaluridae, originating from Western Australia. It resides near the south-western coast of Australia, often observed near drainage basins. Petalura hesperia lives along streams and rivers where it lays its larvae.

== Larvae ==
Petalura hesperia lay their larvae along stream margins because Petalura larvae are semiaquatic, and the larvae create a burrow in the mud along the sides of rivers or streams to serve as protection. They can burrow deeper into mud during dry summers to keep their skin moist. Even as larvae this species is a nocturnal predator, feeding off of other species larvae and small insects such as cockroaches and spiders residing near their burrows along lotic fresh water on lowland, or sometimes in rainforests located on upland.

== Adults ==
Adult dragonflies from the genus Petalura are commonly known as 'petaltails' because of the male's anal appendages, which can vary in colour. Adults of this species live near streams and rivers, and are semiaquatic, living quite like their larvae. They are also nocturnal predators, although they tend to feed off of larger larvae, ones with extended phases, and larger sized bugs than that of what their larvae eat. Adults mate on vegetation, then the females lay their egg larvae in old plant matter. Adults live for 4–6 months. Species of the genus Petalura tend to be univoltine while many other species may take a few years to complete their life cycles.

== Etymology ==
The genus name Petalura is derived from the Greek πέταλον (petalon, "leaf") and οὐρά (oura, "tail"), referring to the leaf-shaped appendages.

The species name hesperia is derived from the Greek ἑσπέριος (hesperios, "towards evening", hence "western"). This species was the first of the genus recorded from Western Australia.

== Gallery ==
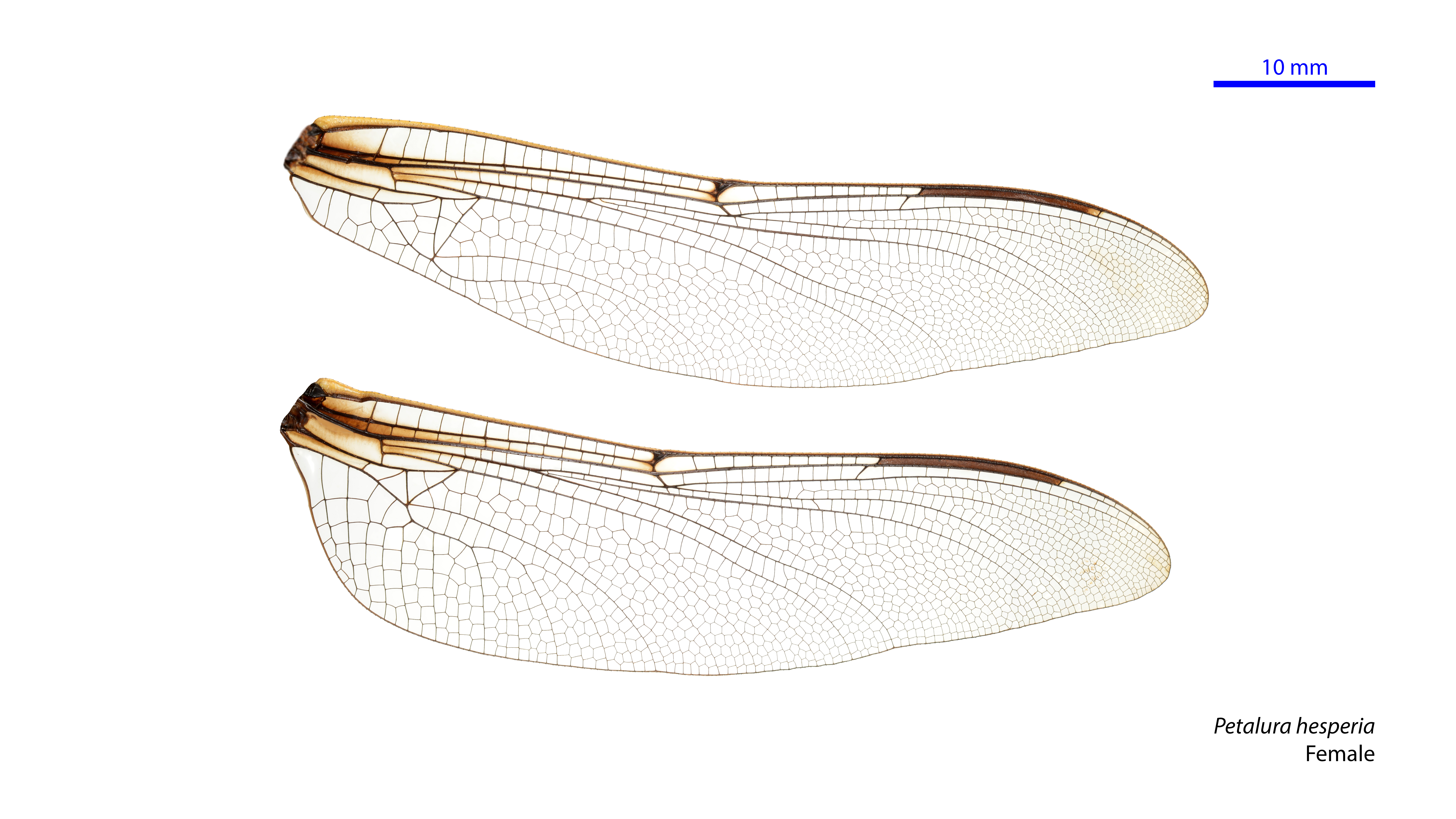
Female wings

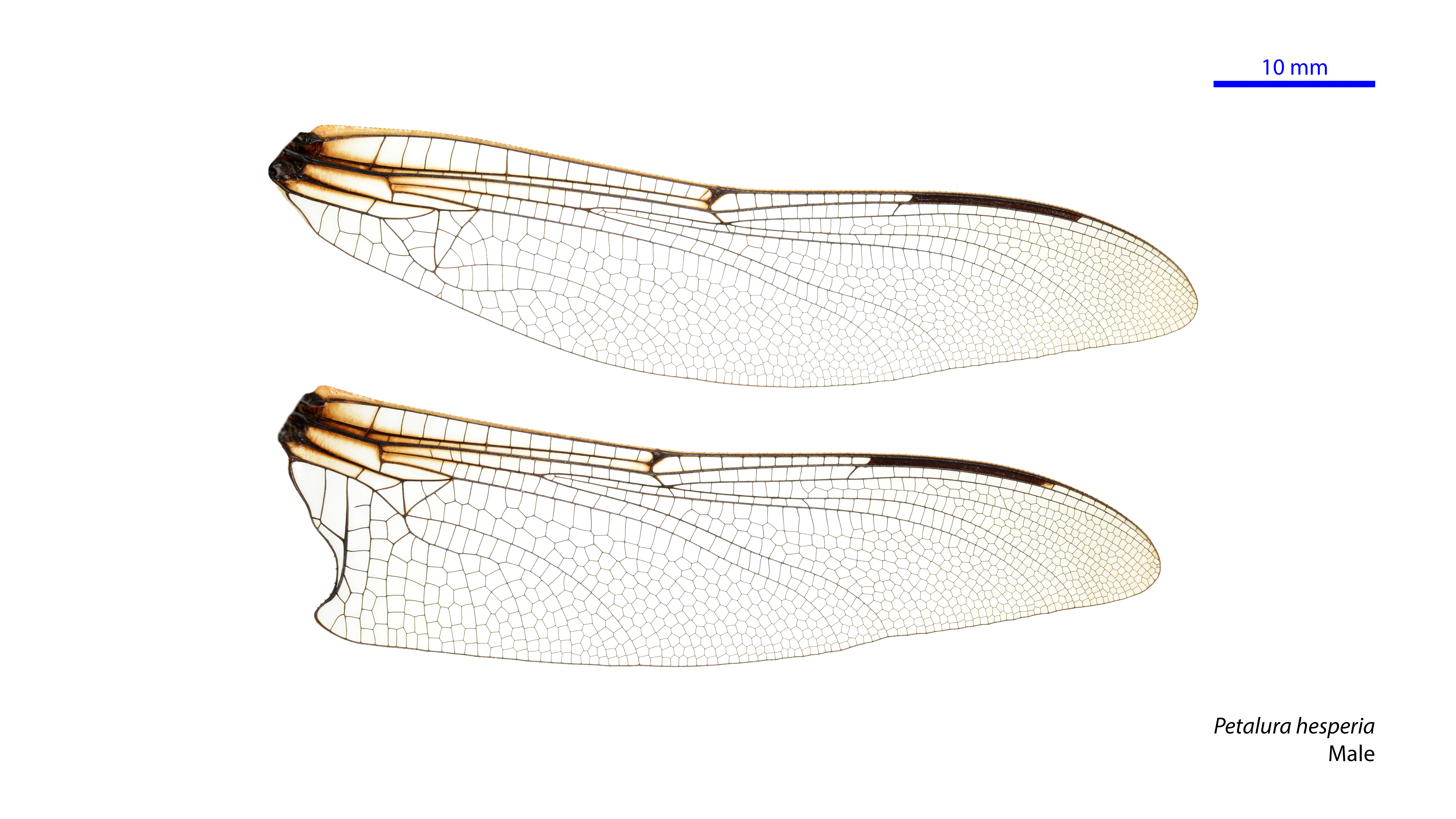
Male wings
