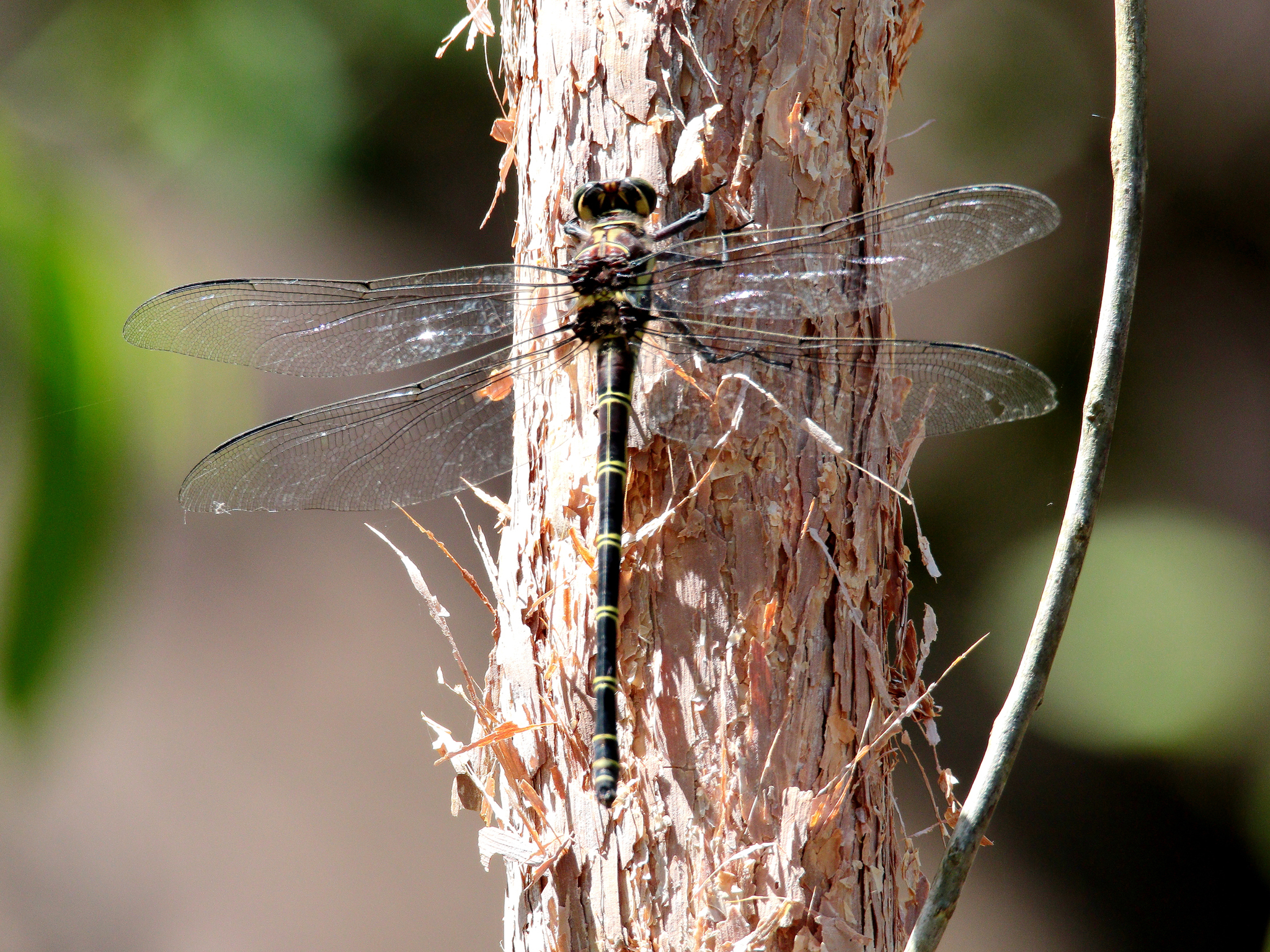
- Petalura ingentissima

Scientific classification
- Kingdom: Animalia
- Phylum: Arthropoda
- Clade: Pancrustacea
- Class: Insecta
- Order: Odonata
- Suborder: Anisoptera
- Family: Petaluridae
- Genus: Petalura; Leach, 1815

= Petalura =

Genus of Australian dragonflies

Petalura is a genus of very large dragonflies in the family Petaluridae. Species of Petalura are brown or black with yellow markings and usually clear wings. The anal appendages of the males are broad and leaf-like giving them their common name of petaltails. They are endemic to south-western and eastern Australia.

== Species ==
The genus includes the following species:

- Petalura gigantea Leach, 1815 - South-eastern petaltail
- Petalura hesperia Watson, 1958 - Western petaltail
- Petalura ingentissima Tillyard, 1908 - Giant petaltail
- Petalura litorea Theischinger, 1999 - Coastal petaltail
- Petalura pulcherrima Tillyard, 1913 - Beautiful petaltail

== Etymology ==
The genus name Petalura is derived from the Greek πέταλον (petalon, "leaf") and οὐρά (oura, "tail"), referring to the leaf-shaped appendages.
