= Charles Jules Edmée Brongniart =

French entomologist and paleontologist

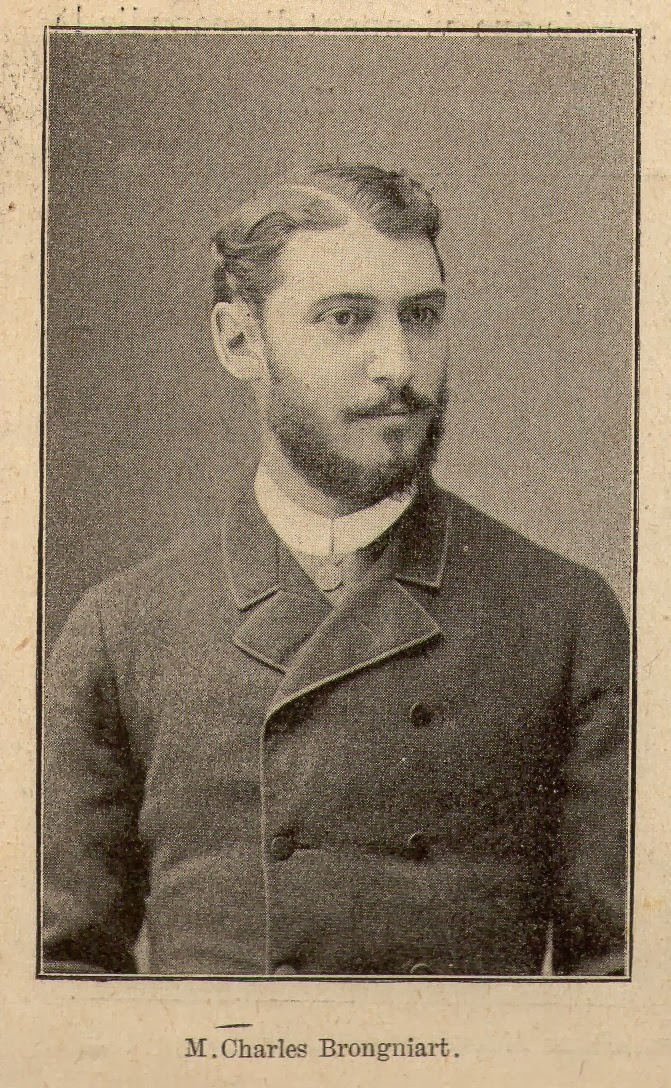
Charles Jules Edmée Brongniart

Charles Jules Edmée Brongniart (11 February 1859, in Paris – 18 April 1899, in Paris) was a French entomologist and paleontologist.

A pioneer in the field of paleoentomology, he made important contributions towards the understanding of insect evolution. He is remembered for his studies of Late Carboniferous fauna found at Commentry, France.

== Selected works ==
- Les Hyménoptères fossiles, 1881 – Hymenoptera fossils.
- Sur un gigantesque Neurorthoptère, provenant des terrains houillers de Commentry (Allier), 1884 – On a gigantic Neurorthoptera, found in the coalfields of Commentry.
- Les Insectes fossiles des terrains primaires : coup d'oeil rapide sur la faune entomologique des terrains paléozoïques, avec 5 planches en héliogravure, 1885; Translated into English by Mark Stirrup (Salford: J. Roberts and Sons, 1885) as "The fossil insects of the primary group of rocks: a rapid survey of the entomological fauna of the Paleozoic systems".
- Tableaux de zoologie (classification) (Hermann, Paris, 1886, réédité en 1887, 1888).
- With Henri Fayol (1841–1925), Études sur le terrain houiller de Commentry (Saint-Étienne, 1887–1888).
- Histoire naturelle populaire. L'homme et les animaux (E. Flammarion, Paris, 1892).
- Recherches pour servir á l'histoire des insectes fossiles des temps primaires : procédées d'une étude sur la nervation des ailes des insectes, 1893 – Research in regards to the history of paleoentomology, etc. (preceded by a study on the venation of insect wings).
- Guide du naturaliste voyageur, enseignement spécial pour les voyageurs. Insectes, myriapodes, arachnides, crustacés (Fils de E. Deyrolle, Paris, 1894).
- With Eugène Louis Bouvier (1856–1944), Instructions pour la recherche des animaux articulés (Autun, 1896).
- Apercu sur les insectes fossiles en general, 1896 – Overview on fossil insects in general.

== Sources and references ==
- Jean Gouillard (2004). Histoire des entomologistes français, 1750-1950. Édition entièrement revue et augmentée. Boubée (Paris) : 287 p.
- Philippe Jaussaud & Édouard R. Brygoo (2004). Du Jardin au Muséum en 516 biographies. Muséum national d’histoire naturelle de Paris : 630 p.
