= Eugène Flachat =

French civil engineer

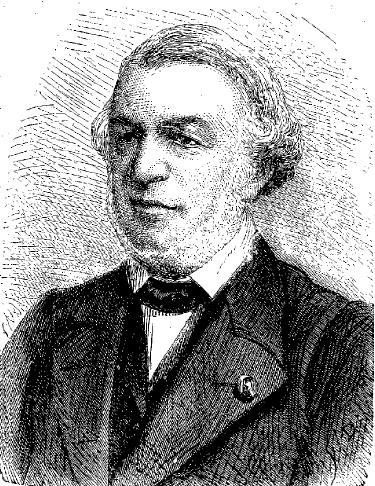
Eugène Flachat

Eugène Flachat (French: [øʒɛn flaʃa]; 16 April 1802 – 16 June 1873 ) was a French civil engineer.

Eugène Flachat and his half-brother Stéphane Mony built the railway line from Paris to Saint Germain between 1833 and 1835. They also built the Paris-Versailles Right Bank railway. Eugène Flachat built the first railroad station in Paris. He is remembered today for redesigning the Gare Saint-Lazare railway station in Paris in 1851 and other railroad related projects. He died in Arcachon. A street in Paris is named for him. His name is one of the 72 names inscribed on the Eiffel Tower.
