= Stéphane Mony =

French politician and engineer

Stéphane Christophe Mony
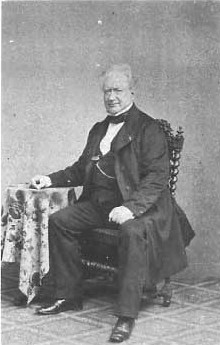

Deputy for Allier
- In office 11 July 1868 – 4 September 1870

Personal details
- Born: 14 February 1800 Paris, France
- Died: 10 March 1884 (aged 84) Blomard, Allier, France
- Occupation: Engineer, businessman, politician

Stéphane Christophe Mony, also known as Stéphane Flachat or Mony-Flachat (French: [stefan mɔni flaʃa]; 14 February 1800 – 10 March 1884), was a French railway engineer, company president and politician. He was involved in the Saint-Simonian movement when a young man. He was trained as an engineer, and he and his half brother Eugène Flachat built the Paris-Saint Germain and Paris-Versailles railway lines between 1833 and 1840. He was then appointed head of the Commentry mining company, later Commentry-Fourchambault, a position he held until his death. He was elected to the legislature towards the end of the Second French Empire, from 1868 to 1870. He did not succeed in getting reelected in the French Third Republic.

== Family ==
Stéphane Christophe Mony was born in Paris on 14 February 1800. He was the son of Marguerite Charlotte Marthe Mony, who had divorced the Paris notary Pierre Jalabert in November 1799. There was no mention of infidelity in the divorce proceedings, and his mother did not inform Jalabert of her pregnancy. In 1801 his mother remarried Christophe Flachat (1759–1843). His stepfather was a former prosecutor who had become a businessman. He was the son of Jean-Claude Flachat (1718–1775), who had introduced the cotton industry to Lyon. His mother had Stéphane baptized with the name "Flachat". This led to legal disputes over paternal authority in 1835, and resulted in his change of name to Mony. His half brothers were Adolphe Flachat (1801–77) and Eugène Flachat (1802–1873).

Flachat began preparatory courses for a career as a mining engineer on 25 July 1820, and was admitted to the École des Mines de Paris on 16 March 1821. He left the school in June 1821 and was removed from the list of pupils on 24 January 1822. Flachat married Jeanne-Marie Pelletier (1806–1885). Their son Stéphane Adolphe Mony (1831–1909) also attended the Ecole des Mines but left without graduating.

== Engineer (1821–40) ==
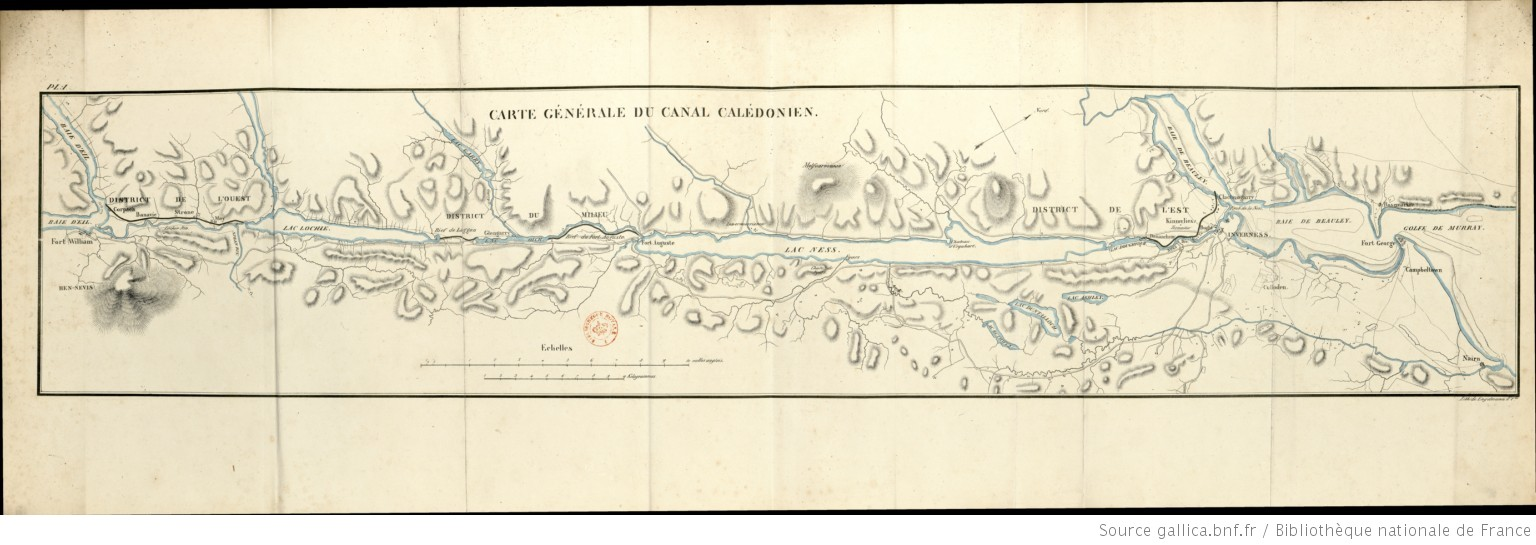
Map of the Caledonian Canal

After leaving school Flachat became involved in the Saint-Simonian movement and for some time was the host of the Saint-Simonian house at Ménilmontant. He contributed to the liberal journal Le Constitutionnel. For a period he prospected for mines. From 1823 to 1830 he was engaged in studying the maritime canal from Le Havre to Paris. He published an Atlas of the Caledonian Canal in 1828. This work described how the technical problems of water management in a sea-to-sea canal had been solved, a subject of interest to canal builders in France. His report on the Maritime canal from Le Havre to Paris was published in 1829.

In 1832 Mony, as a member of the Collège de la Religion Saint-Simonienne, wrote a 4-page pamphlet on avoiding Cholera in Paris by supplying running water and a sewage system. In 1834 Flachat published a 160-page book on Industry at the French Industrial Exposition of 1834. As a Saint-Simonean he religiously glorified industry. His popular book summarizing Charles Dupin's official report on the exposition argued that what before has been a display of an arsenal was now a contribution to universal peace and industrial development. In his 1835 Traité élémentaire de mécanique industrielle Flachat rejected the distinction that Charles Babbage had made between machines that transmit force and those that product it. He argued that machines never make force, but only transform it.

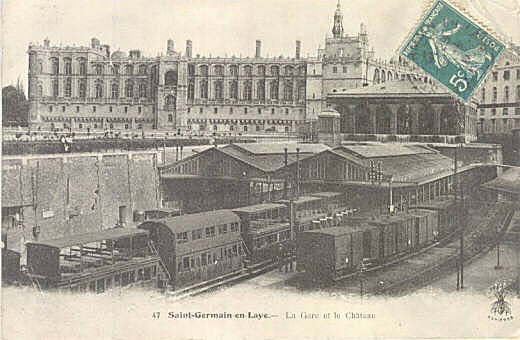
St Germain en Laye station

Stéphane Flachat, his brother Eugène and his childhood friend Benoît Paul Émile Clapeyron participated in construction of the railway line from Paris to Saint Germain^{(fr)}. They had the financial support of Adolphe d'Eichthal^{(fr)}, Rothschild, Auguste Thurneyssen, Sanson Davillier and the Péreire brothers (Émile^{(fr)} and Isaac^{(fr)}). The Péreires were also Saint-Simonians. In 1837 Mony was made a knight of the Legion of Honour for his work on the Paris to Saint-Germain railway. The Flachats also built the Paris-Versailles Right Bank railway, and in 1840 Stéphane was chief engineer of the two railway lines.

== Commentry mines (1840–84) ==
In 1840 Mony was asked by Paul Rambourg^{(fr)}, a schoolmate at the Ecole des Mines, to take charge of the Société Rambourg frères and the Commentry mine. On 17 December 1853 Boigues Rambourg & Cie was formed as a société en commandite par actions (publicly traded partnership) by the merger of seven firms with the Commentry Mine, the Montluçon Blast Furnace and the Fourchambault Iron Manufacturing Workshop. From 1856 Mony had deteriorating relations with the former owners, Paul Benoist d'Azy of Boigues and Paul Rambourg. They wanted the two main component companies to retain independence and separate management, while Mony wanted to integrate them for greater efficiency during a period of economic difficulties.

In 1860 Mony decided to hire the best engineers from the Saint-Étienne Mining School, and Henri Fayol joined the firm as an engineer and trainee manager. Mony made Fayol his protege, and Fayol succeeded him as manager of the Commentry Mine and eventually as managing director of Commentry-Fourchambault and Decazeville. In 1874 the company was transformed into a société anonyme (public limited company), the Société de Commentry, Fourchambault et Decazeville. The former owner families were removed from management, leaving Mony in charge with Eugène Glachant and Anatole Le Brun de Sessevalle as his assistants. Mony continued to run the company until his death.

== Politics ==
Mony was a member of the Commentry municipal council from 1843. He was made an Officer of the Legion of Honour on 13 August 1864. He was elected mayor of Commentry in 1866, and general councillor of Allier in 1867. He was elected to the legislature for the 3rd constituency of Allier in a by-election of 11 July 1868 to replace Édouard Fould^{(fr)}, who had resigned. He joined the dynastic majority group. He was reelected on 23 May 1869 and again sat with dynastic majority. In the chamber he issued several reports on public works and was involved in discussions on the budget and on the strikes at Le Creusot. In June he asked for an interpellation concerning the effect of the Gotthard Tunnel on France. He left office when the Second French Empire was dissolved on 4 September 1870.

After the defeat of France in the Franco-Prussian War (1870–71) the mood in the mining community changed drastically. The coal miners were no longer willing to vote for the boss of the company, but instead voted for left-wing republican candidates who were often hostile to the industrialists. Mony ran for reelection to the legislature in 1871 but was defeated. He tried again in 1877 of the list of Marshal MacMahon, but was again defeated. Stéphane Mony died on 10 March 1884 in Blomard, Allier, aged 84.

== Publications ==
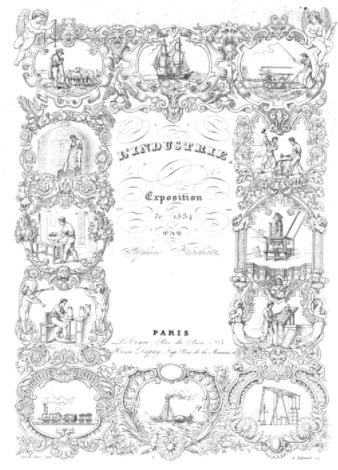
Cover of L'industrie Exposition de 1834

Publications by Stéphane Flachat / Mony included:

- Stéphane Flachat (1828), Histoire des travaux et de l'aménagement des eaux du canal calédonien (rédigée d'après les rapports de MM. Jessop et Telford), Paris: impr. de F. Didot, p. 92
- Stéphane Flachat (1829), Du Canal maritime de Rouen à Paris et des perfectionnements de la navigation intérieure par rapport à Marseille, Bordeaux, Nantes, Le Hâvre, Metz et Strasbourg, Paris: F. Didot, p. 470
- Gustave d' Eichthal; Stéphane Flachat; Henri Fournel (1831), Religion saint-simonienne : rapports adressés aux pères suprêmes sur la situation et les travaux de la Famille [au 31 juillet 1831], Paris: Impr. Guiraudet, p. 33
- Gustave d'Eichthal; Stéphane Flachat; Henri Fournel; Hippolyte Carnot (1831), Religion saint-simonienne. Rapports adressés aux Pères suprêmes sur la situation et les travaux de la Famille, Paris: impr. de Guiraudet, p. 33
- Stéphane Flachat (1832), Religion saint-simonienne. Le choléra à Paris, Paris: impr. de Éverat, p. 4
- Stéphane Flachat (1832), Le Choléra. Assainissement de Paris (Religion saint-simonienne), Paris: impr. d'Everat, p. 4
- Émile Clapeyron; Eugène Flachat; Stéphane Flachat; Gabriel Lamé (1832), Vues politiques et pratiques sur les travaux publics de France, Paris: impr. de Éverat, p. 336
- Stéphane Flachat (1834), L'Industrie. Exposition de 1834, Paris: L. Tenré, p. 160
- Stéphane Flachat (1834), De la réforme commerciale (Extrait de la Revue des Deux-Mondes, 1er novembre 1834), Paris: impr. de H. Fournier, p. 56
- Stéphane Flachat (1835), Traité élémentaire de mécanique industrielle (Seconde publication de l'industrie), Paris: L. Tenré, p. 212
- Stéphane Flachat (1835), Manuel et code d'entretien et de construction, d'administration et de police des routes et des chemins vicinaux, Paris: L. Tenré et H. Dupuy, p. 121
- Stéphane Flachat Mony; G. Bonnet (1835), Manuel et code d'entretien et de construction, d'administration et de police des routes et des chemins vicinaux, Paris: L. Tenré
- Eugène Flachat; Stéphane Mony; Jules Pétiet (1839), Chemin de fer de Paris à Meaux, Paris: impr. de J. Didot l'aîné, p. 23
- Eugène Flachat; Stéphane Mony; Jules Pétiet (1841), Calculs sur la force centrifuge développée par le passage des convois dans les courbes des chemins de fer, démontrant l'impossibilité d'y dépasser certaines vitesses avec sécurité, Paris: impr. de Crapelet, p. 4
- Stéphane Mony (1860), Note sur le complément des voies de communication dans le centre de la France, Paris: impr. de P. Dupont, p. 38
- Stéphane Mony (1869), Un mot sur la centralisation et sur l'impôt, Paris: impr. de P. Dupont, p. 4
- Stéphane Mony (1869), Lettre sur la crise politique (Extract from the Courrier de l'Allier), Montluçon : impr. de Crépin-Leblond, p. 16
- Stéphane Mony (1870), A mes concitoyens de la 3e circonscription électorale de l'Allier, Montluçon: impr. de Crépin-Leblond
- Stéphane Mony (1871), De la Décentralisation, Paris: impr. de P. Dupont, p. 446
- Stéphane Mony (1872), Note sur l'octroi de Commentry, Montluçon: impr. de Crépin-Leblond, p. 15
- Stéphane Mony (1875), Chemin de fer de Champagnac à Saint-Denis-lès-Martel (Note en réponse à une lettre du marquis de Castellane aux maires du département du Cantal), Paris: impr. de Vve Éthiou-Pérou, p. 7
- Stéphane Mony (1875), Chemin de fer de Champagnac à St-Denis-lès-Martel (Lettre au ministre des Travaux publics en réponse aux observations de la Compagnie de Clermont à Tulle.), Paris: impr. de Vve Éthiou-Pérou, p. 16
- Stéphane Mony (1877), Chemins de fer départementaux. Lettres par M. S. Mony. Groupe de Montmarault. Chemin de fer de Montluçon à Néris (Extrait du journal "Le Centre"), Montluçon: impr. de A. Herbin, p. 15
- Stéphane Mony (1877), Étude sur le travail, Paris: Hachette, p. 552
- Stéphane Mony (1877), Ville de Commentry. La question des eaux, Montluçon : impr. de A. Herbin / Commentry. Allier, p. 8
- Stéphane Mony (1878), Estudio sobre el trabajo, Pau: impr. de Vignancour, p. 371
- Stéphane Mony (1882), Étude sur le travail, résumé et conclusions (2 ed.), Paris: Hachette, p. 126
- Stéphane Mony (1909), Étude sur le travail (3 ed.), Paris: Hachette, p. 466
- Gustave d' Eichthal; Stéphane Flachat; Henri Fournel (1977), Rapports adressés aux Pères suprêmes sur la situation et les travaux de la Famille, Paris: Hachette, p. 49

== Sources ==
- B. (1829), Bulletin des sciences technologiques (in French), Imprimerie de Fain
- "Christophe Stéphane Mony (1800–1884) dit Flachat", Annales des Mines (in French)
- Flachat, Stéphane (1828), Histoire des travaux et de l'aménagement des eaux du canal calédonien (rédigée d'après les rapports de MM. Jessop et Telford), Paris: impr. de F. Didot, p. 92
- Flachat, Stéphane (1829), Du canal maritime de Rouen à Paris: et des perfectionnemens de la navigation intérieure, par rapport à Marseille, Bordeaux, Nantes, Le Havre, Metz, et Strasbourg (in French), Didot
- Flachat, Stéphane (1834), L'industrie: Exposition de 1834, L. Tenré
- Ledru-Rollin (1836), Journal du palais, Au Bureau du Journal Du Palais
- Reid, Donald (1993), Paris Sewers and Sewermen: Realities and Representations, Harvard University Press, ISBN 978-0-674-65463-1
- Robert, Adolphe; Cougny, Gaston (1889–1891), "Mony (Stéphane-Christoph)", in Edgar Bourloton (ed.), Dictionnaire des Parlementaires français (1789–1889) (in French)
- Stéphane, Christophe Mony (in French), Assemblée nationale
- Stéphane Flachat (1800–1884) (in French), BnF: Bibliotheque nationale de France
- Tresch, John (2012-02-06), The Romantic Machine: Utopian Science and Technology after Napoleon, University of Chicago Press, ISBN 978-0-226-81222-9
- Wiseman, Nicholas Patrick (1838), The Dublin Review, Booker & Dolman
- Wood, John C.; Wood, Michael C. (2002), Henri Fayol: Critical Evaluations in Business and Management, Taylor & Francis, ISBN 978-0-415-24818-1
