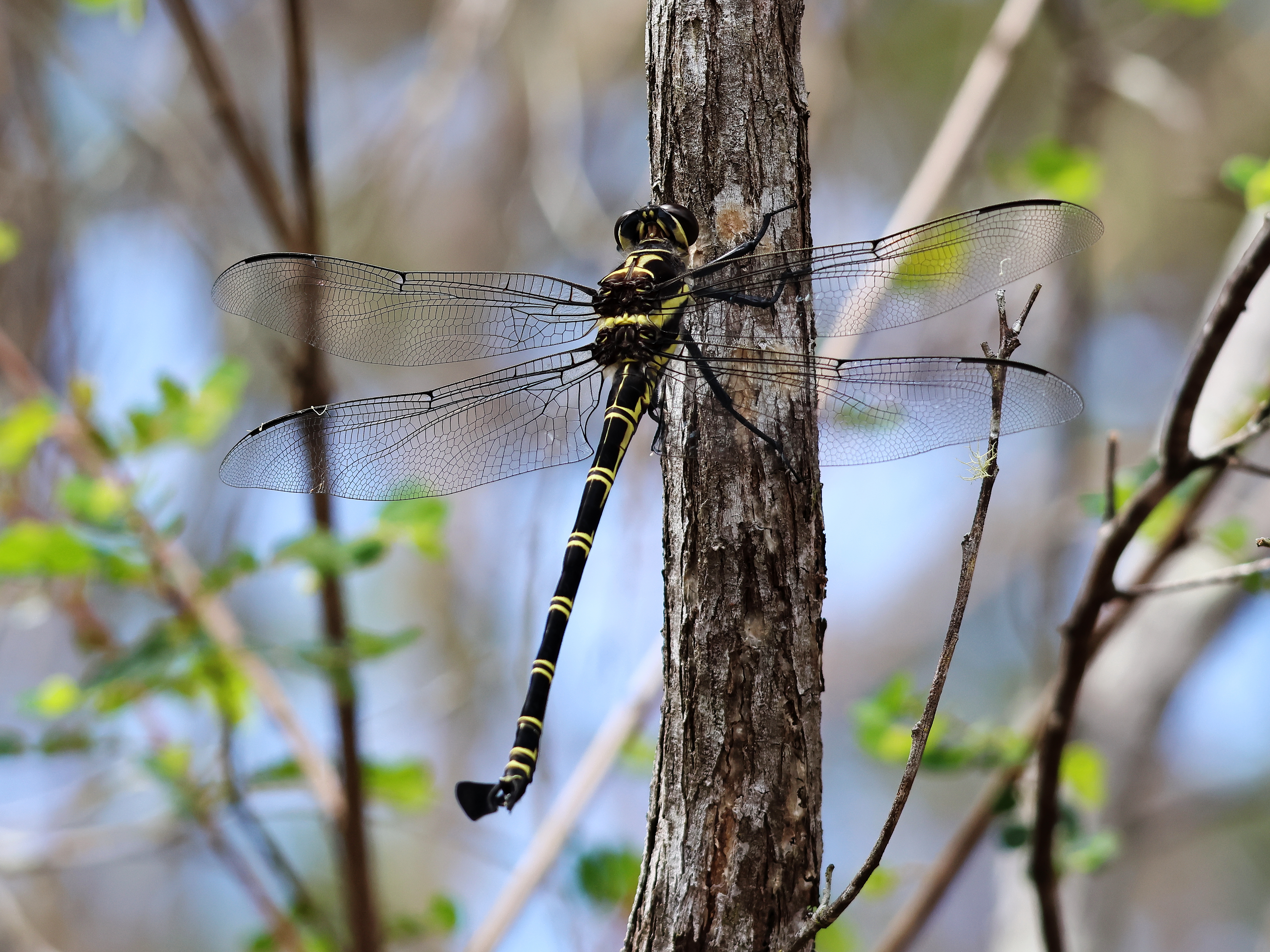
- Male, North Queensland, Australia

Conservation status
- Least Concern (IUCN 3.1)

Scientific classification
- Kingdom: Animalia
- Phylum: Arthropoda
- Clade: Pancrustacea
- Class: Insecta
- Order: Odonata
- Suborder: Anisoptera
- Family: Petaluridae
- Genus: Petalura
- Species: P. ingentissima

Binomial name
- Petalura ingentissima Tillyard, 1908

= Petalura ingentissima =

Giant petaltail

Species of dragonfly

Petalura ingentissima, the giant petaltail, has been described as the world's largest dragonfly, with a wingspan of 160 mm. It is found in Queensland, Australia.

Dr R.J. Tillyard described the giant petaltail in 1908. Its species name is derived from the Latin adjective ingens "huge". It is one of five species in the Australian genus Petalura.

A large, heavily built dragonfly, the giant petaltail has a black body with some yellow markings. The female's wingspan can be 158–162 mm and body length 125 mm, the largest dragonfly species in overall dimensions although members of the genus Tetracanthagyna can have longer wings and Chlorogomphus papilio a larger wing area.

Measuring 5.9–6.3 cm long, the larvae are unusual in that they live in burrows along the river margin and hunt passing prey.

== Etymology ==
The genus name Petalura is derived from the Greek πέταλον (petalon, "leaf") and οὐρά (oura, "tail"), referring to the leaf-shaped appendages.

The species name ingentissima is the superlative form of the Latin ingens ("enormous"), referring to the species being much larger than Petalura gigantea.

== Gallery ==
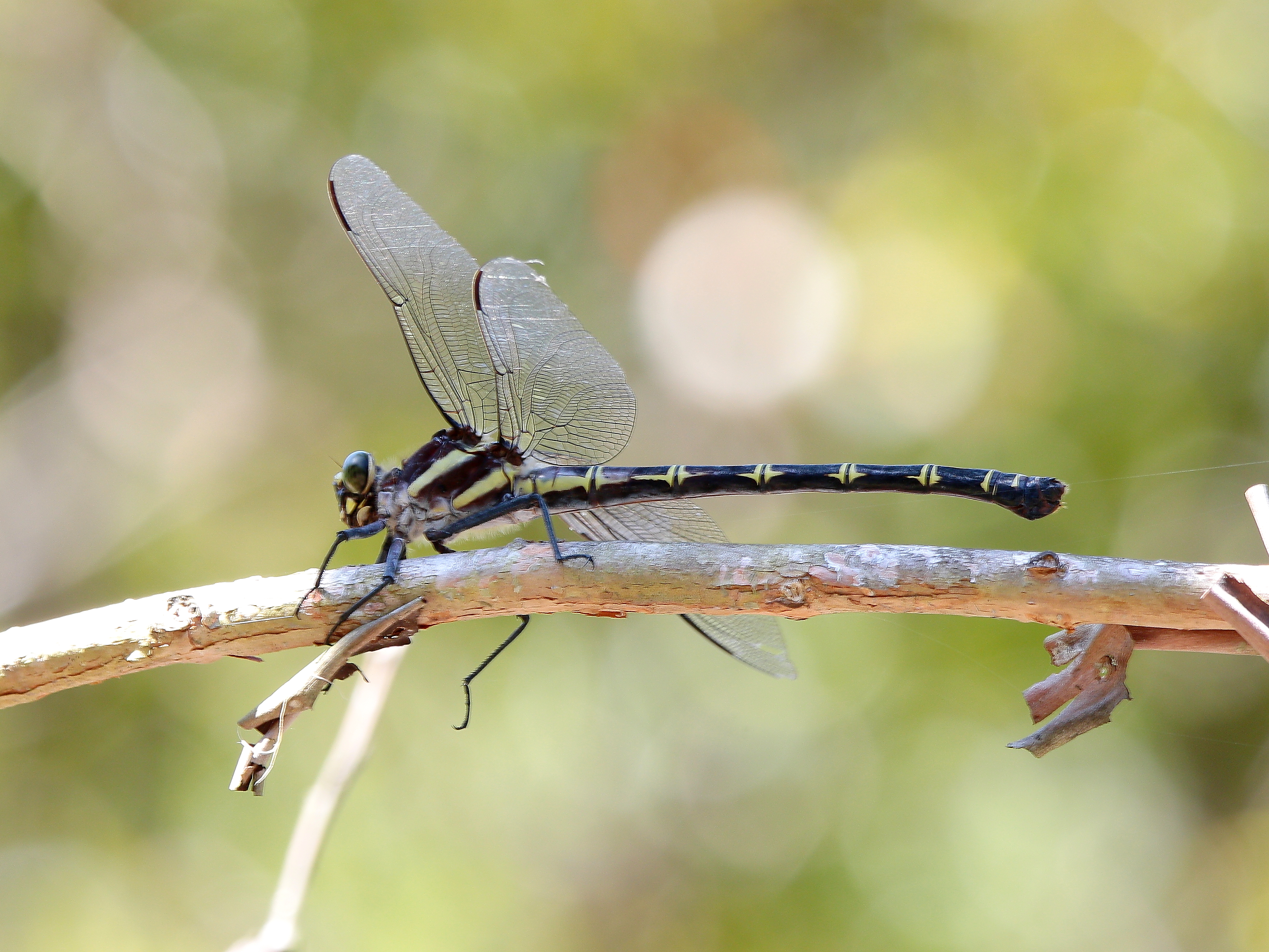
Female at Tully Gorge, Queensland

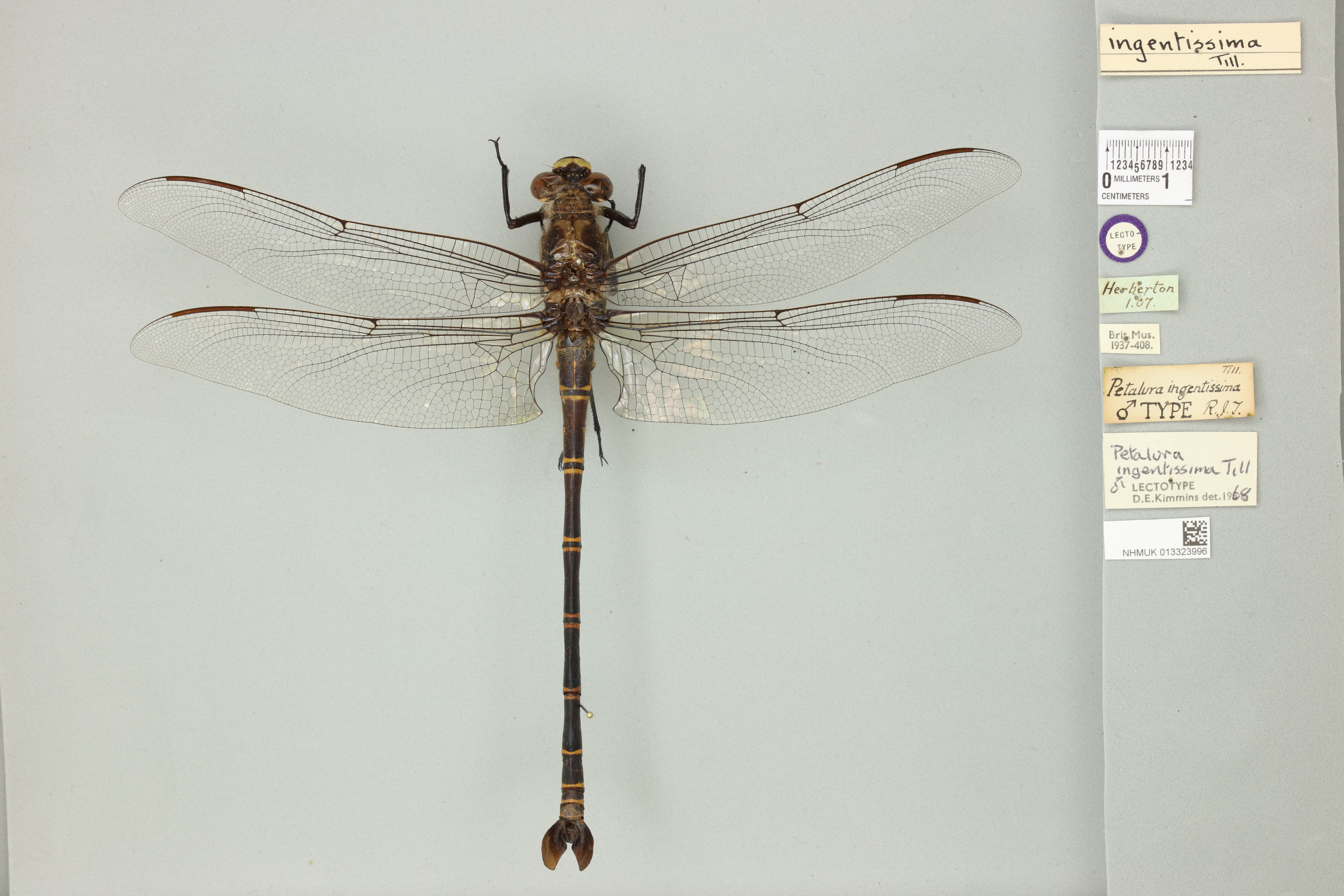
Type specimen, male, held at the Natural History Museum, London

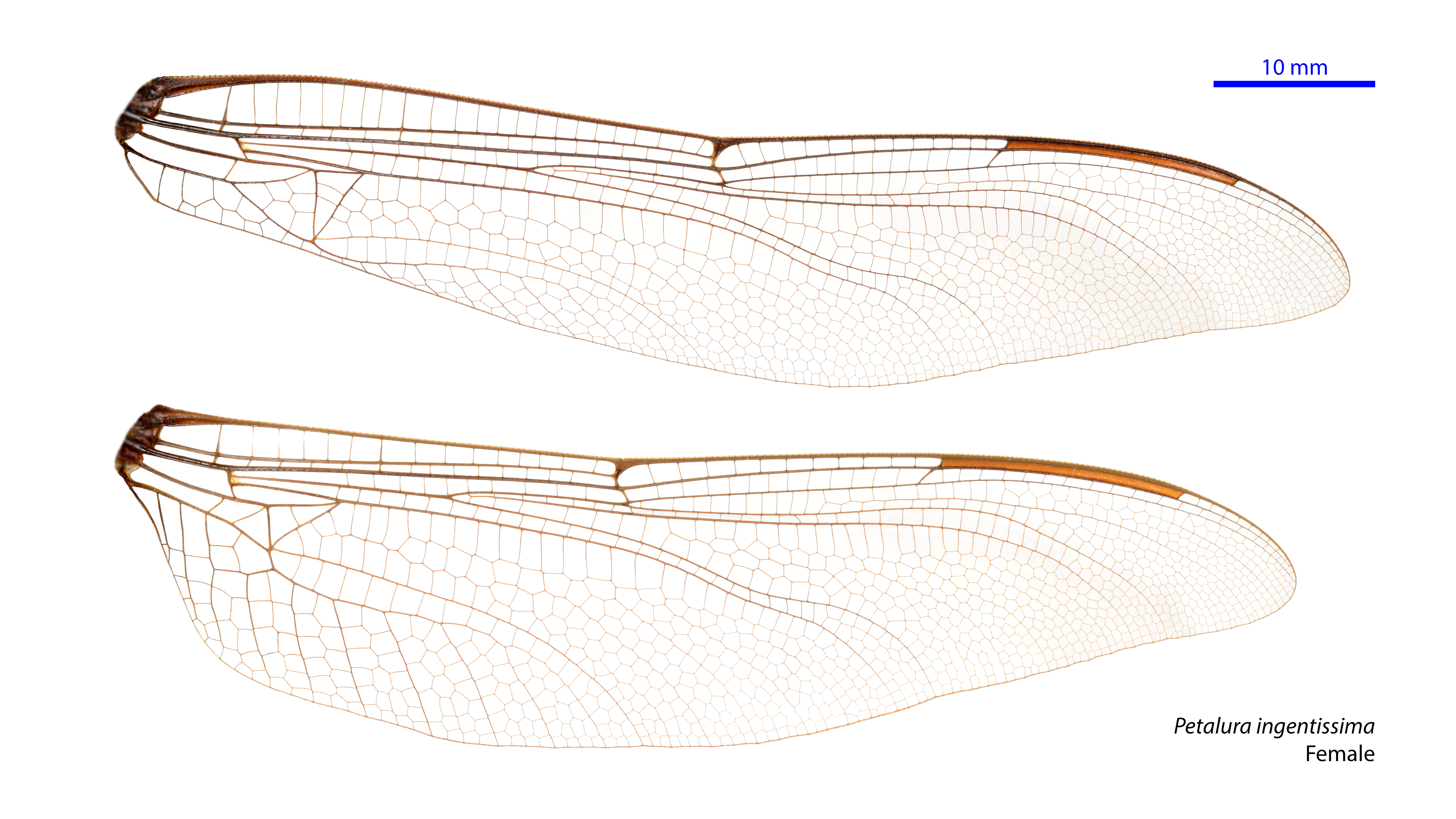
Female wings

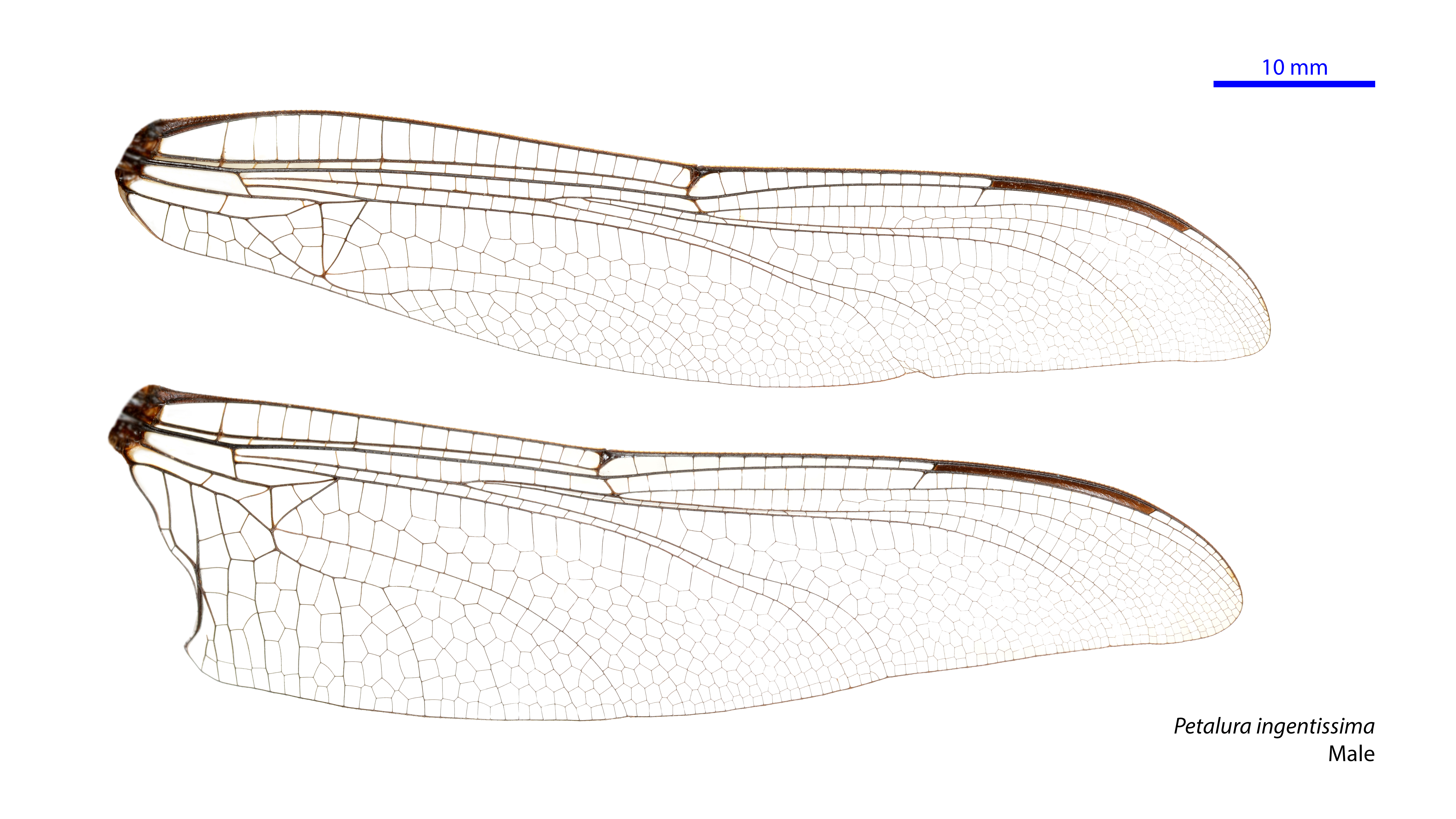
Male wings

== See also ==
- List of Odonata species of Australia
