= List of Odonata species of New Zealand =

New Zealand is home to a limited variety (17 species) of Odonata (dragonflies and damselflies), which can be identified based on the appearance of the adult or of the aquatic larva. Of the sixteen species assessed on the IUCN red list, all are considered of least concern.

== Number of species ==
In 1981 thirteen species were understood to reside in New Zealand, with ten species of dragonfly and three damselflies. According to Dragonflies and Damselflies of New Zealand (2019) this number had by then risen to fourteen, although that count excluded Xanthocnemis tuanuii, found on the remote Chatham Islands; and Pantala flavescens, which occasionally passes through but does not breed in New Zealand; with these two species included in the list the number comes to sixteen. The same year as Dragonflies and Damselflies of New Zealand was released, a new species of dragonfly was described, bringing the species count up to seventeen: Hemicordulia armstrongi was described from specimens previously understood to be H. australiae; it is believed that H. australiae does indeed still occur in New Zealand as well.

== List of species ==
Order	Species name	Common name	Endemic?	Conservation status
Anisoptera; Dragonflies
Anisoptera; Dragonflies	Adversaeschna brevistyla	Lancer dragonfly	No	LC
Anisoptera; Dragonflies	Antipodochlora braueri	Dusk dragonfly	Yes	LC
Anisoptera; Dragonflies	Anax papuensis	Baron dragonfly	No	LC
Anisoptera; Dragonflies	Diplacodes bipunctata	Red percher dragonfly	No	LC
Anisoptera; Dragonflies	Hemicordulia australiae	Sentry dragonfly	No	LC
Anisoptera; Dragonflies	Hemicordulia armstrongi (Note: H. armstrongi may occur in Australia, but records are inconclusive.)	—N/a	Maybe	NE
Anisoptera; Dragonflies	Pantala flavescens	Wandering glider	No	LC
Anisoptera; Dragonflies	Procordulia smithii	Ranger dragonfly	Yes	LC
Anisoptera; Dragonflies	Procordulia grayi	Yellow spotted dragonfly	Yes	LC
Anisoptera; Dragonflies	Tramea transmarina	Red glider dragonfly	No	LC
Anisoptera; Dragonflies	Tramea loewii	Common glider	No	LC
Anisoptera; Dragonflies	Uropetala carovei	Bush giant dragonfly	Yes	LC
Anisoptera; Dragonflies	Uropetala chiltoni	Mountain giant dragonfly	Yes	LC
Zygoptera; Damselflies
Zygoptera; Damselflies	Austrolestes colensonis	Blue damselfly	Yes	LC
Zygoptera; Damselflies	Ischnura aurora	Gossamer damselfly	No	LC
Zygoptera; Damselflies	Xanthocnemis zealandica	Common redcoat damselfly	Yes	LC
Zygoptera; Damselflies	Xanthocnemis tuanuii	Chatham redcoat damselfly	Yes	LC

== General references ==
- Marinov, Milen (2019). Dragonflies and Damselflies of New Zealand. Auckland University Press (published 18 July 2019). ISBN 978-1-77671-043-0.
- Rowe, R.J. (1981). "An annotated key to the New Zealand Odonata". Mauri Ora. 9: 71–81.
- Rowe, R.J. (1981). "Odonata (damselflies and dragonflies): Key to larvae". In Winterbourn, Michael J.; Gregson, Katharine L.D. (eds.). Guide to the Aquatic Insects of New Zealand (PDF). pp. 10–14.
- "New Zealand species". odonata.org.uk. 2 August 2017. Archived from the original on 21 April 2025.
