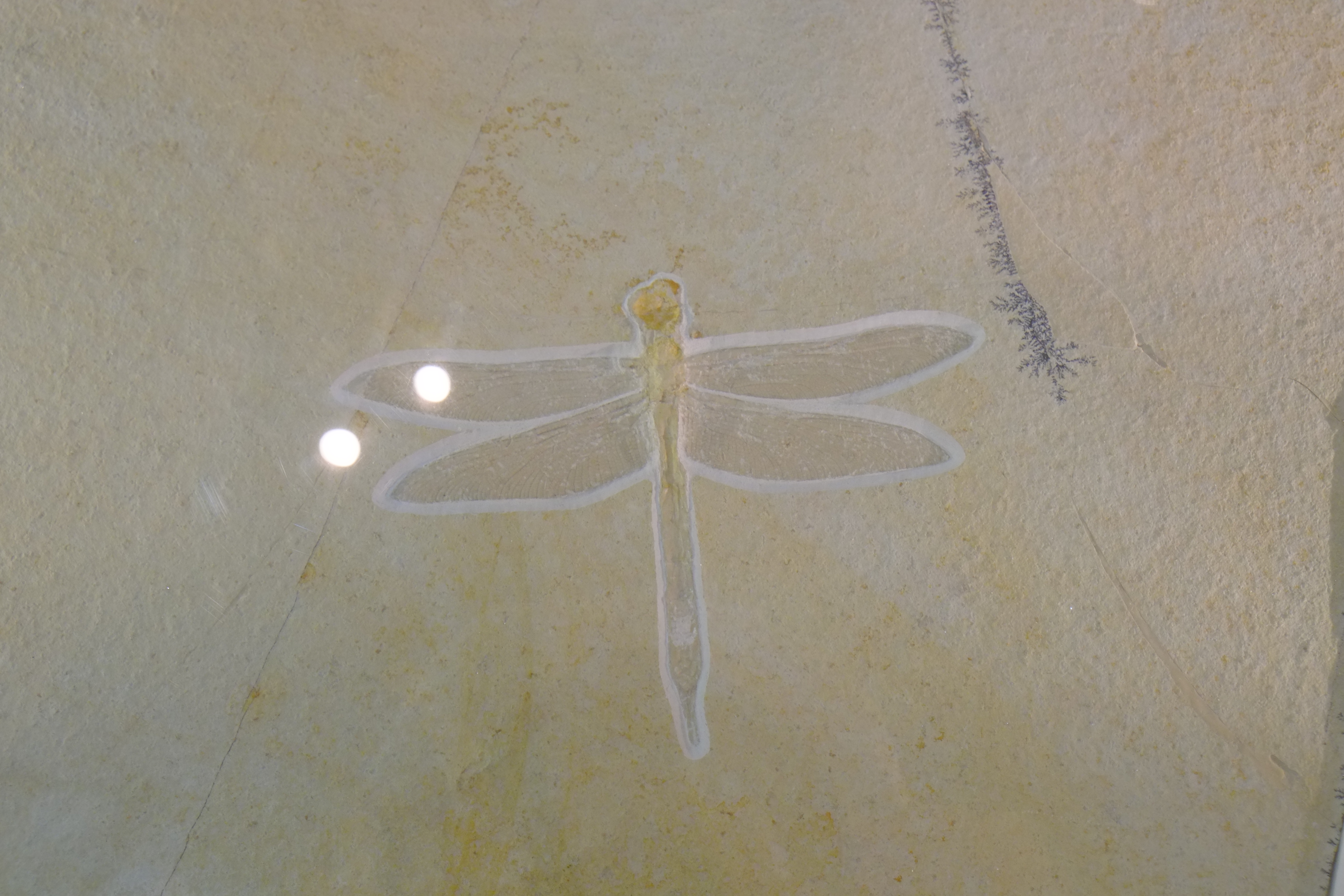
- Fossil of Libellulium longiarata

Scientific classification
- Kingdom: Animalia
- Phylum: Arthropoda
- Class: Insecta
- Order: Odonata
- Infraorder: Anisoptera
- Family: Petaluridae
- Genus: †Libellulium; Westwood, 1854

= Libellulium =

Libellulium Temporal range: Jurassic

Extinct genus of insects

Libellulium is an extinct genus of dragonfly from the Jurassic period known from fossil finds in Europe.
