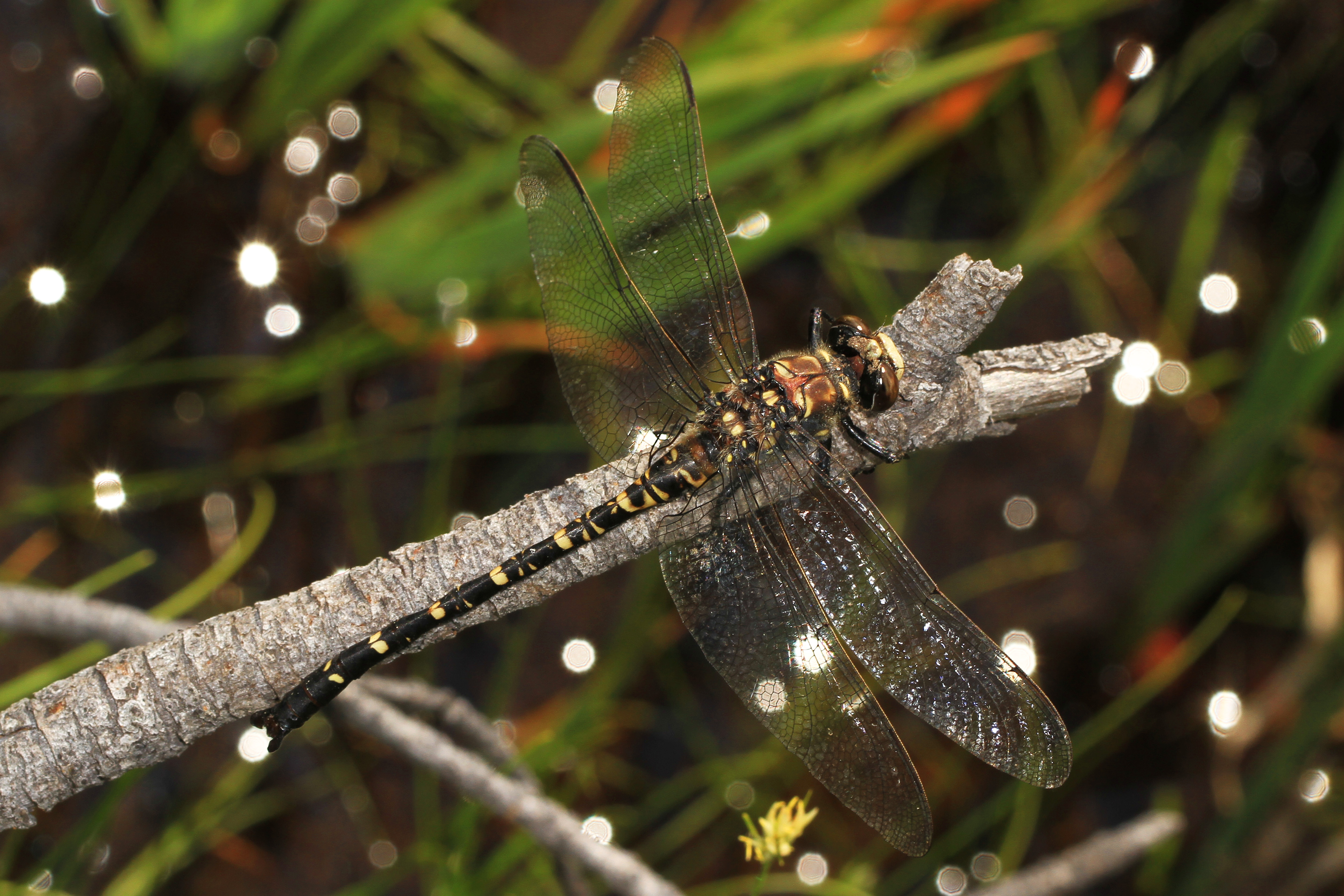

Scientific classification
- Kingdom: Animalia
- Phylum: Arthropoda
- Clade: Pancrustacea
- Class: Insecta
- Order: Odonata
- Suborder: Anisoptera
- Family: Petaluridae
- Genus: Tanypteryx
- Species: T. hageni

Binomial name
- Tanypteryx hageni (Selys, 1879)

= Tanypteryx hageni =

Species of dragonfly

Tanypteryx hageni, commonly known as the black petaltail, is a species of dragonfly in the family Petaluridae. It is native to the Pacific Northwest of North America and is one of only two members of the genus Tanypteryx. The other species lives in Japan.
