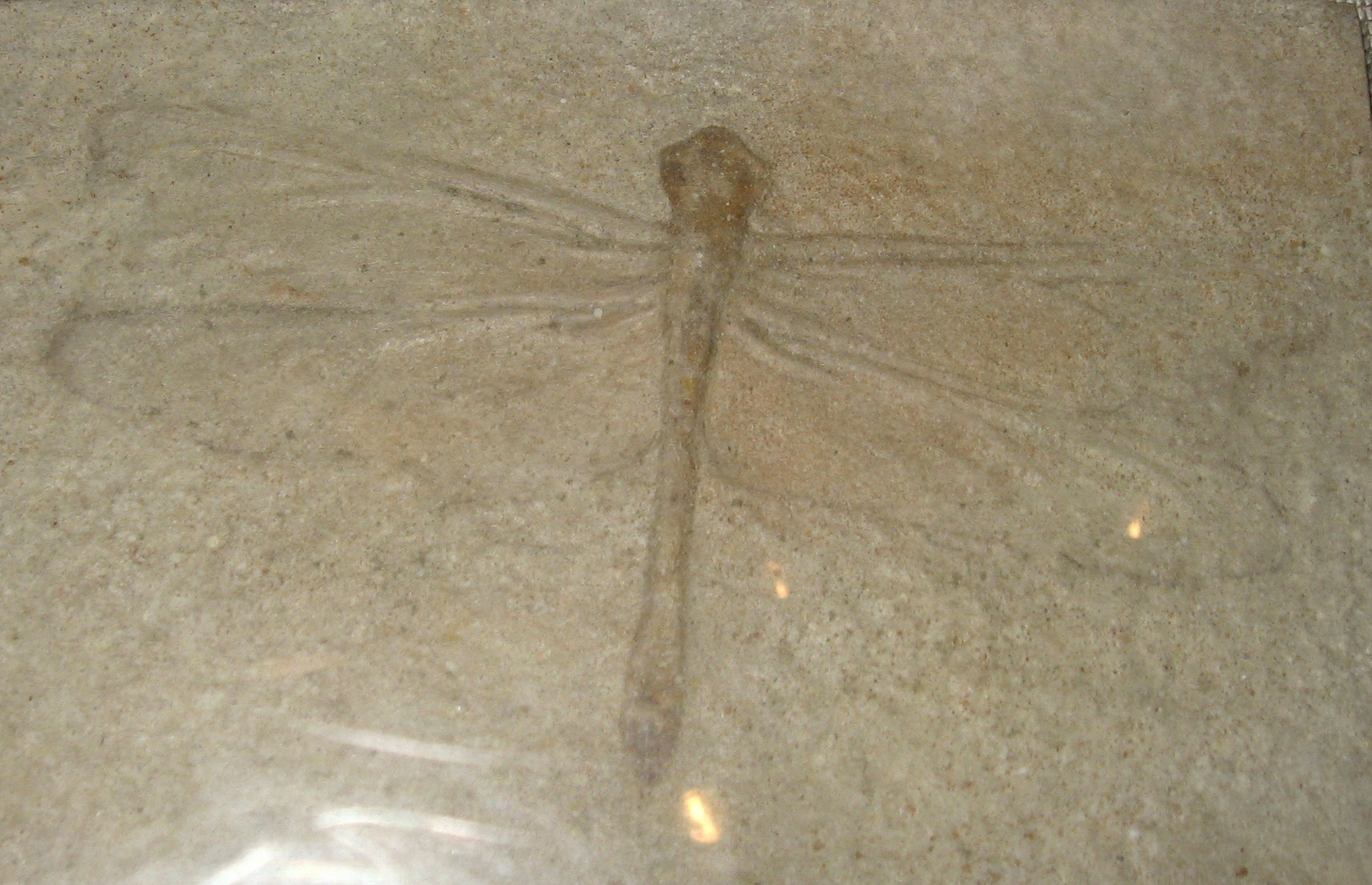
- Fossil dragonfly Protolindenia wittei, Upper Jurassic, Solnhofen Plattenkalk

Scientific classification
- Kingdom: Animalia
- Phylum: Arthropoda
- Clade: Pancrustacea
- Class: Insecta
- Order: Odonata
- Infraorder: Anisoptera
- Superfamily: †Petaluroidea; Needham, 1903

= Petaluroidea =

Petaluroidea Temporal range: Late Jurassic (Kimmeridgian)–Late Cretaceous (Cenomanian)

Extinct superfamily of dragonflies

Petaluroidea is an extinct superfamily of dragonflies known from the Late Jurassic to the Late Cretaceous.

The superfamily formerly included the extant family Petaluridae. In the current classification of living dragonflies, Petaluroidea is no longer recognised, with Petaluridae now placed in the superfamily Gomphoidea.

== Taxonomic history ==
Petaluroidea was established by Needham in 1903 to accommodate the family Petaluridae.

Subsequent classifications continued to recognise Petaluroidea as a superfamily containing the extant family Petaluridae. As the fossil record became better known, several extinct families were also assigned to the superfamily.

In 2026, Carter and colleagues revised the classification of extant Odonata, transferring Petaluridae to Gomphoidea and no longer recognising Petaluroidea as a superfamily of living dragonflies. This classification has subsequently been adopted by the World Odonata List.

== Fossil record ==
Fossils assigned to Petaluroidea are known from the Late Jurassic (Kimmeridgian) to the Late Cretaceous (Cenomanian), with occurrences recorded from Europe and Asia.

Fossil classifications have assigned a number of extinct dragonfly groups to Petaluroidea, including †Aktassiidae, while the placement of other families such as †Cretapetaluridae and †Protolindeniidae has varied between classifications.

Although numerous fossil genera have previously been assigned to the extant family Petaluridae, the only fossil genus confidently placed within the crown family is †Argentinopetala from the Early Cretaceous of Argentina.

The relationships of several fossil petaluroids remain uncertain, and some studies have suggested that parts of the traditional petaluroid assemblage may instead represent early relatives of the Gomphidae.

== Etymology ==
The superfamily name Petaluroidea is derived from the type genus Petalura, with the standard zoological suffix -oidea used for superfamilies.

The genus name Petalura is derived from the Greek πέταλον (petalon, "leaf") and οὐρά (oura, "tail"), referring to the enlarged leaf-shaped appendages of the males.
