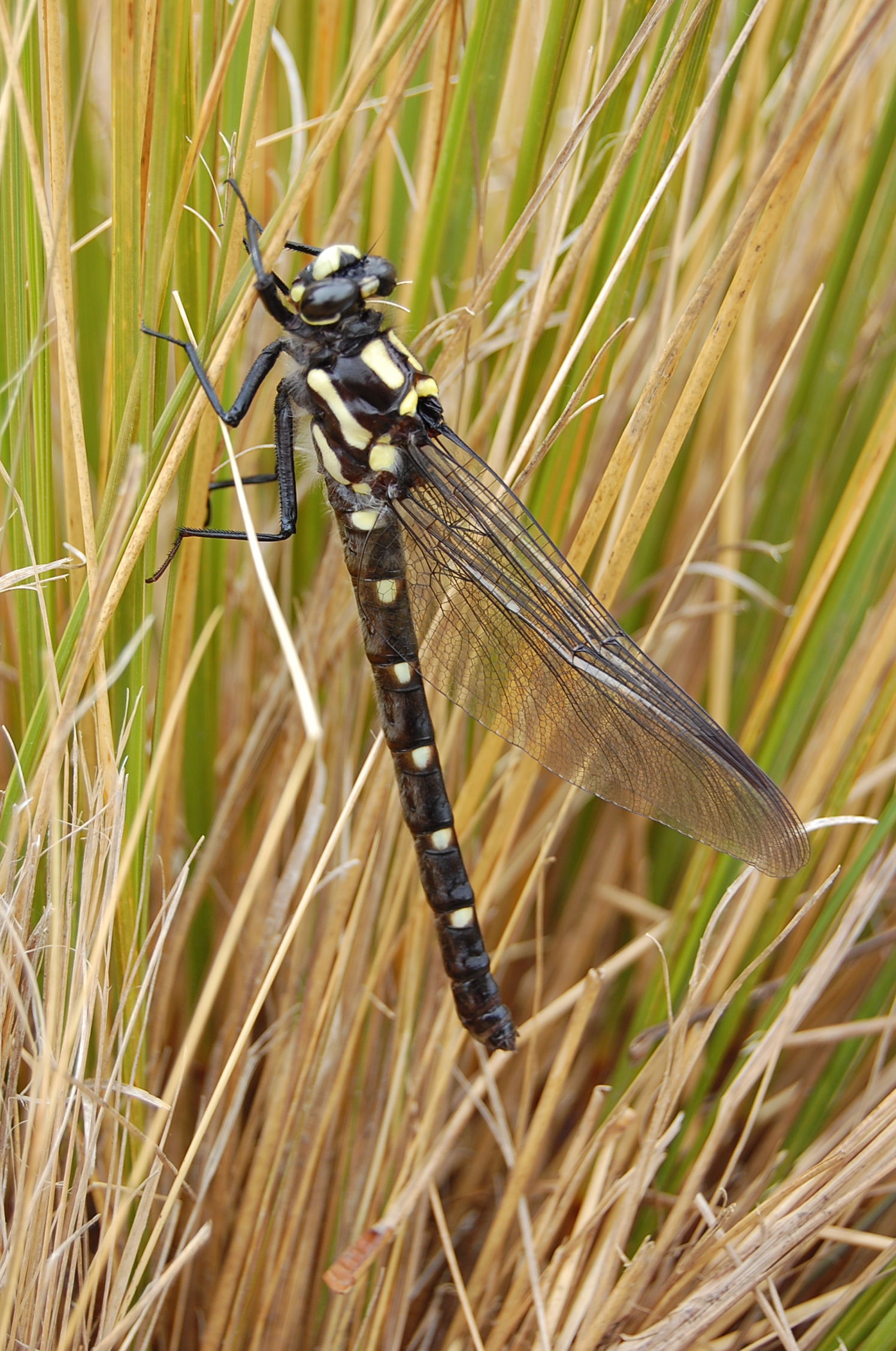

Conservation status
- Least Concern (IUCN 3.1)

Scientific classification
- Kingdom: Animalia
- Phylum: Arthropoda
- Clade: Pancrustacea
- Class: Insecta
- Order: Odonata
- Suborder: Anisoptera
- Family: Petaluridae
- Genus: Uropetala
- Species: U. chiltoni

Binomial name
- Uropetala chiltoni Tillyard, 1921

= Uropetala chiltoni =

Species of dragonfly

Uropetala chiltoni (New Zealand mountain giant dragonfly) is a giant dragonfly in the family Petaluridae, endemic to New Zealand. The Māori name for giant dragonflies, kapokapowai, means "water snatcher", alluding to the water-dwelling juvenile stage (nymph), which, like all dragonflies, has a long extendable jaw that shoots out to snatch prey.

== Description ==
The second-largest New Zealand dragonfly species, Uropetala chiltoni has a body length of about 80 mm and wingspan of about 100 mm. Uropetala chiltoni can be distinguished from the similar Uropetala carovei by large pale blotches on its labrum (which in Uropetala carovei is all black), and its black femur leg segments (which are brownish in Uropetala carovei). It was described as a separate species in 1921, based on specimens collected at Cass and Arthur's Pass.

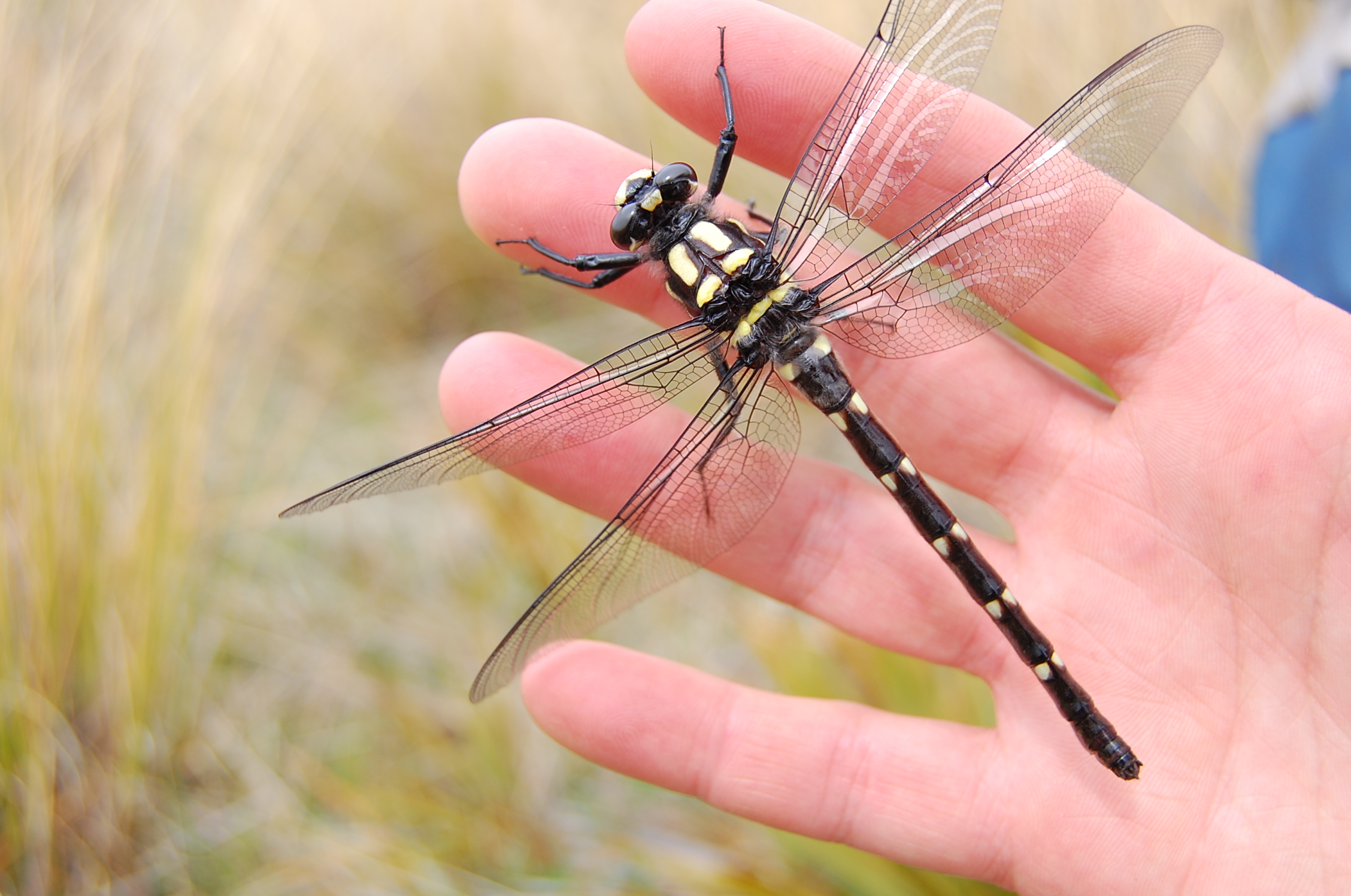
A giant mountain dragonfly (Uropetala chiltoni) at Beaumont Station, Otago, New Zealand

== Distribution ==
This species is found only in New Zealand, in upland and sub-alpine parts of the South Island. It has been recorded from Lake Rotoiti down to Lake Wakatipu and east to the Old Man Range and Garvie Mountains. There are also unconfirmed reports from the southern North Island.

== Ecology ==
The nymphs tunnel into the soft earth around alpine swamp or seepage in Schoenus tussock grassland. Even when forest cover is present the larvae prefer wetlands in forest clearings. They occupy a chamber half-filled with water for perhaps 5–6 years, emerging at night to seek prey near the burrow entrance. Tillyard observed that the larvae when dug out of their burrows are docile, not aggressive like those of U. carovei. Adults hunt around forest margins and swampland.
