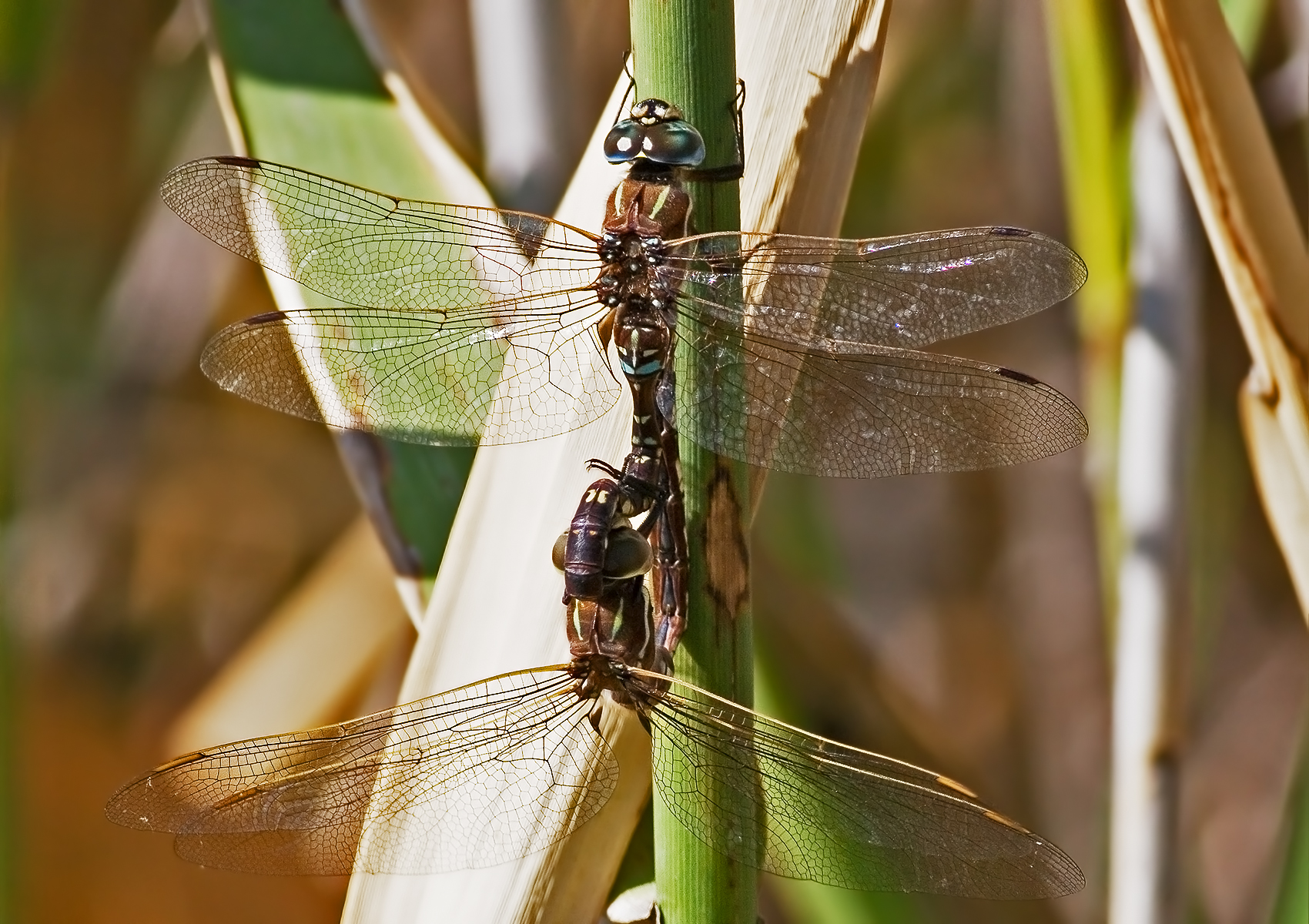
- Blue-spotted hawkers

Scientific classification
- Kingdom: Animalia
- Phylum: Arthropoda
- Clade: Pancrustacea
- Class: Insecta
- Order: Odonata
- Infraorder: Anisoptera
- Family: Aeshnidae
- Genus: Adversaeschna; Watson, 1992

= Adversaeschna =

Genus of dragonflies

Adversaeschna is a monotypic genus of large dragonflies in the family Aeshnidae. Adversaeschna brevistyla is the only known species of this genus which is found in Australia, New Zealand, Norfolk Island and some Pacific Islands.

== Species ==
The genus Adversaeschna includes only one species:

- Adversaeschna brevistyla (Rambur, 1842)

== Etymology ==
The word Adversaeschna is a combination of two Latin words: adversus, meaning opposite in physical position; and aeschna, derived from the genus Aeshna named by Danish entomologist Johan Fabricius in 1775. Adversaeschna brevistyla was described by Tony Watson in 1992 as being taxonomically isolated from other dragonflies in the genus Aeshna.
