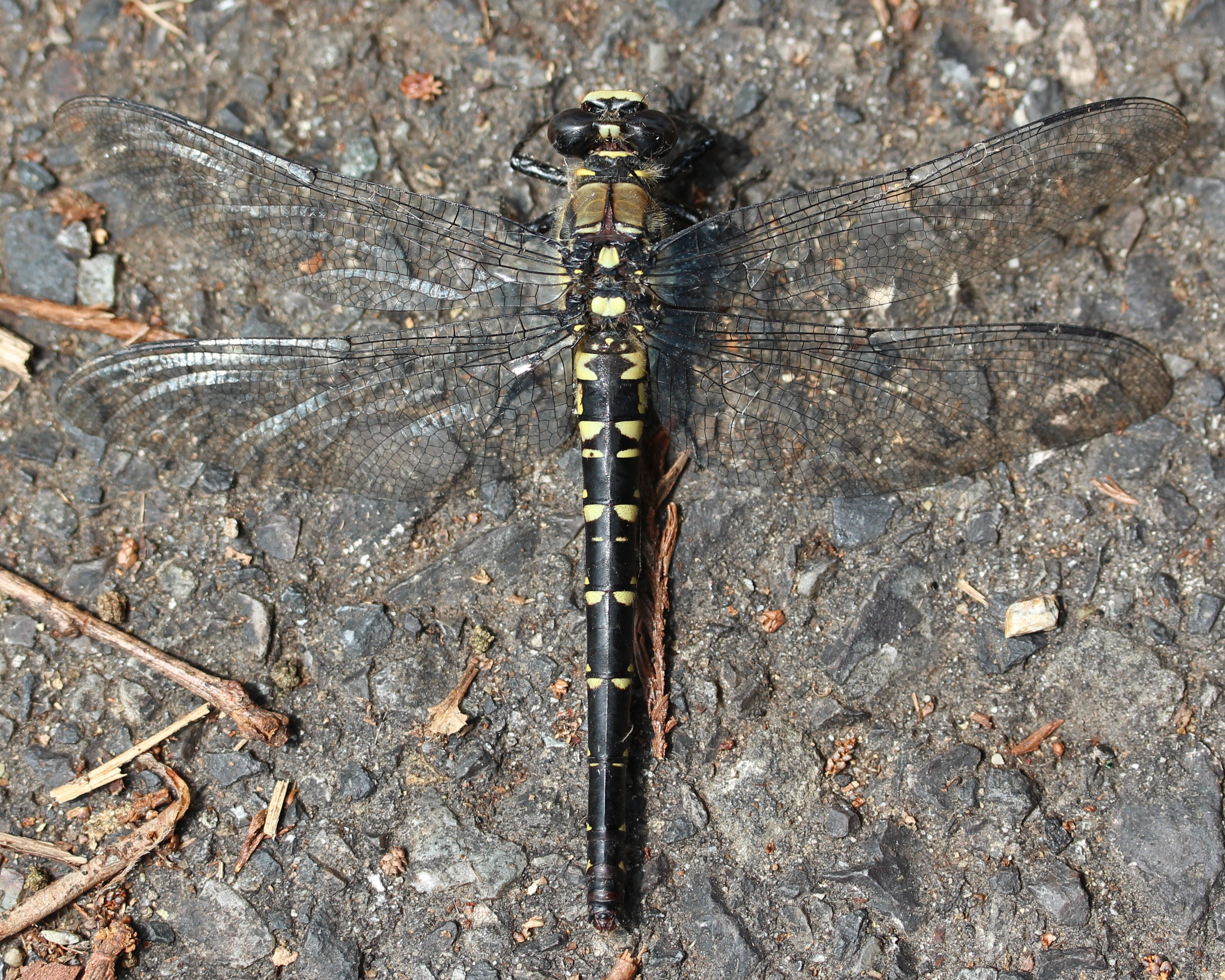
- Tanypteryx pryeri

Scientific classification
- Kingdom: Animalia
- Phylum: Arthropoda
- Clade: Pancrustacea
- Class: Insecta
- Order: Odonata
- Infraorder: Anisoptera
- Family: Petaluridae
- Genus: Tanypteryx; Kennedy, 1917

= Tanypteryx =

Genus of dragonflies

Tanypteryx is a small genus of dragonflies in the family Petaluridae. The genus contains only two species. One Tanypteryx hageni (Selys, 1879), the black petaltail, occurs in the Pacific Northwest and the other, Tanypteryx pryeri (Selys, 1889), is found in Japan.
