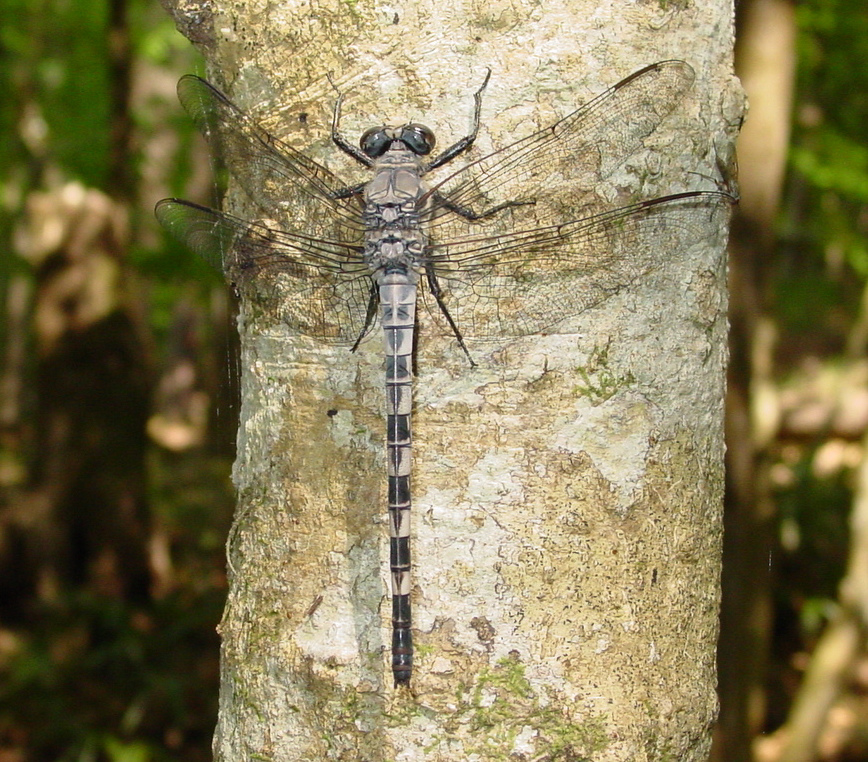

Conservation status
- Apparently Secure (NatureServe)

Scientific classification
- Kingdom: Animalia
- Phylum: Arthropoda
- Clade: Pancrustacea
- Class: Insecta
- Order: Odonata
- Infraorder: Anisoptera
- Family: Petaluridae
- Genus: Tachopteryx; Uhler in Selys, 1859
- Species: T. thoreyi

Binomial name
- Tachopteryx thoreyi (Hagen in Sélys, 1858)

Synonyms
- Uropetala thoreyi Selys, 1858

= Tachopteryx =

Species of dragonfly

Tachopteryx thoreyi, commonly known as the gray petaltail and Thorey's grayback, is a species of dragonfly. It is native to the East Coast of the United States from New York to Florida, and west to Texas. This species is the only member of the monotypic genus Tachopteryx.

The gray petaltail lives in highlands, woodlands, and deciduous forests with permanent seeps, often indicated by the presence of skunk cabbage and ferns.

The gray petaltail is primarily gray and black in color; the thorax is usually entirely gray, while the abdomen is gray and black. The adult is 7.1 to 8.0 centimeters in length.
