= Phenes =

Conservation status
- Least Concern (IUCN 3.1)

Scientific classification
- Kingdom: Animalia
- Phylum: Arthropoda
- Class: Insecta
- Order: Odonata
- Infraorder: Anisoptera
- Family: Petaluridae
- Genus: Phenes; Rambur, 1842
- Species: P. raptor

Binomial name
- Phenes raptor Rambur, 1842

Species of dragonfly

Phenes raptor is a species of dragonfly from Chile and other parts of South America. Larvae specimen have been collected along the Malleco River and additionally from a farm mill, whereas an adult specimen has been collected from additional sites in Chile. Phenes raptor is a predator, and it is the physically largest dragonfly in Chile.

Phenes raptor is the only member of the genus Phenes.

== Description ==
Phenes raptor measures approximately 35–52 mm for its hindwings. They tend to have thin yet stubby bodies, tinted lightly yellow. Their faces are black, with a thin crossbar above its mouth, while its eyes are set widely apart, and the eyes are eventually joined by a point or dot near the center of its face. The male Phenes raptor has small anal appendages (more commonly known as tails), with three to four 4-celled triangles, which includes a small notch towards the tip of the appendage. Veins connect the anus and the hindwings. The females do not have any veins connecting their stigma to another area of their anatomy. Their wings are not symmetrically formed and often have a forewing triangle which is divided into two to three cells and a few dots bordering the edge of the wing. The specimen's frons is well developed and has a longitudinal groove which slightly parted the frons. The abdomen has patterns on it, described as "leaf-like". Some specimens have small, red claws which are mainly retracted. The red thorax has two yellow stripes and is covered in small, white hairs.
