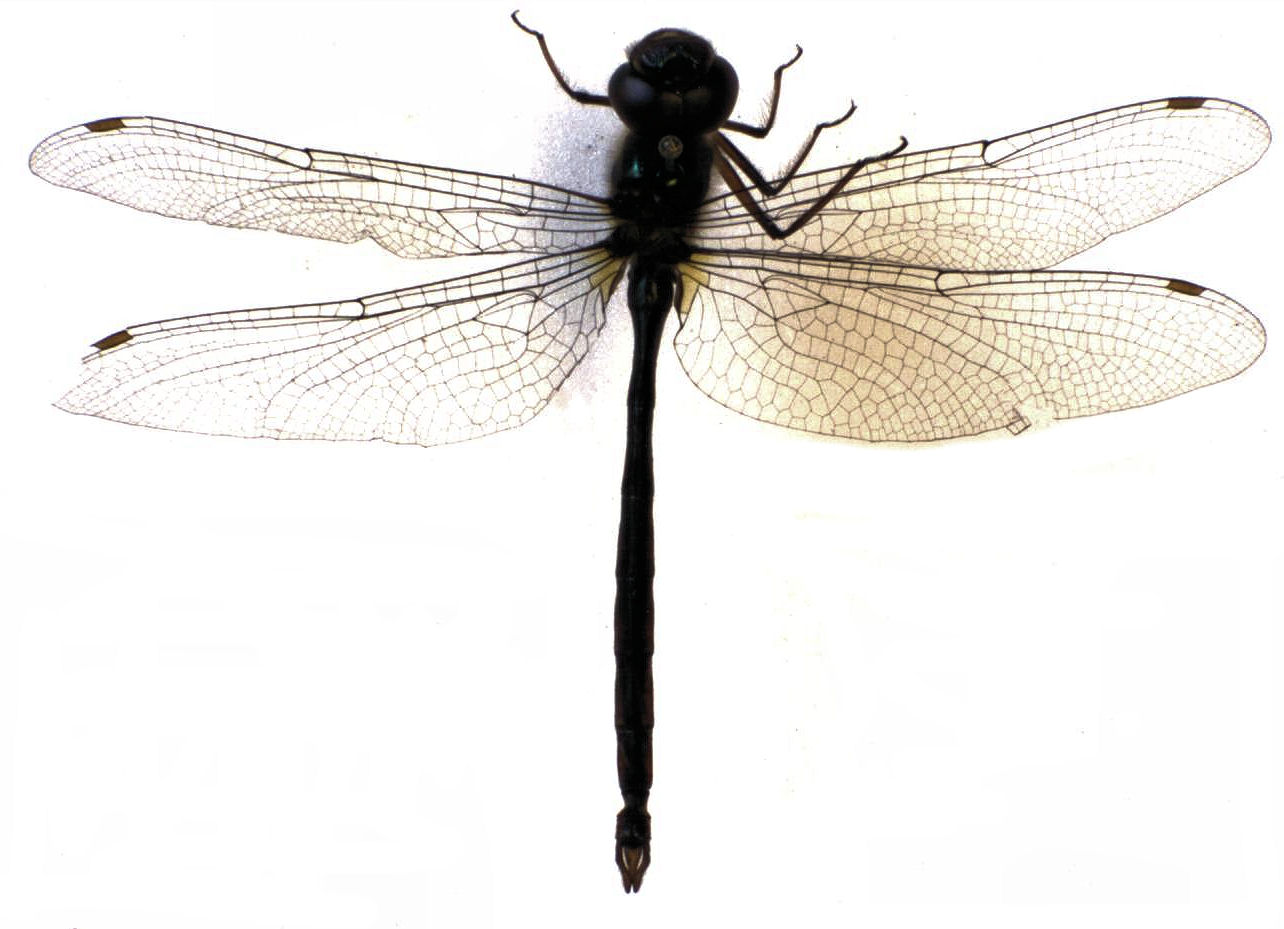
- Antipodochlora braueri

Scientific classification
- Kingdom: Animalia
- Phylum: Arthropoda
- Class: Insecta
- Order: Odonata
- Infraorder: Anisoptera
- Family: Corduliidae
- Subfamily: Corduliinae
- Genus: Antipodochlora

= Antipodochlora =

Genus of dragonflies

Antipodochlora is a genus of dragonfly in the family Corduliidae. It contains the following species:

- Antipodochlora braueri – Dusk dragonfly
