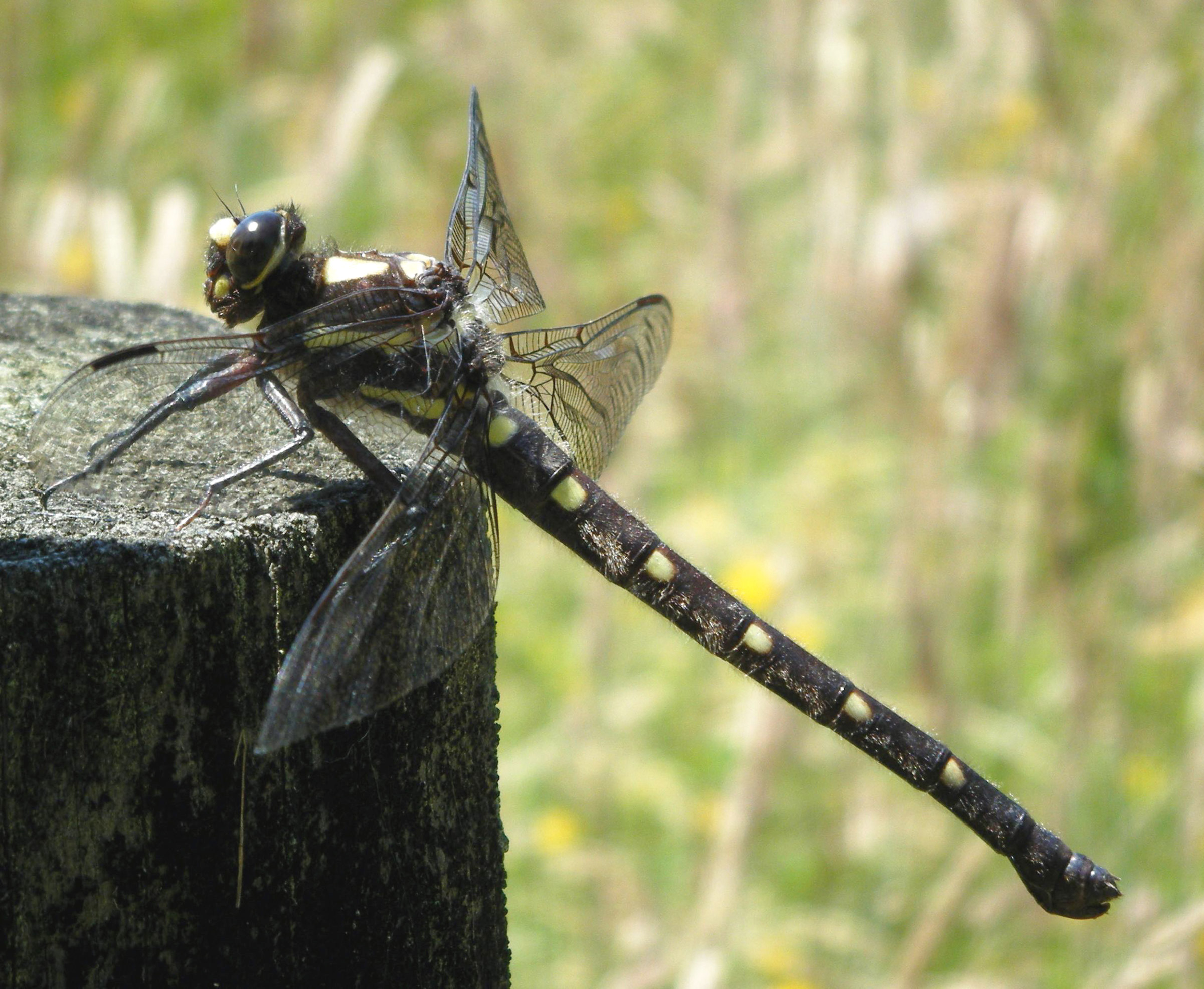

Conservation status
- Least Concern (IUCN 3.1)

Scientific classification
- Kingdom: Animalia
- Phylum: Arthropoda
- Clade: Pancrustacea
- Class: Insecta
- Order: Odonata
- Suborder: Anisoptera
- Family: Petaluridae
- Genus: Uropetala
- Species: U. carovei

Binomial name
- Uropetala carovei (White, 1843)

Synonyms
- Petalura carovei White, 1843

= Uropetala carovei =

Species of insect

Uropetala carovei (New Zealand bush giant dragonfly) is a giant dragonfly of the family Petaluridae, endemic to New Zealand. Its Māori name, kapokapowai (or kapowai) means "water snatcher", alluding to the water dwelling juvenile stage (nymph), which, like all dragonflies, has a long extendable jaw that shoots out to snatch prey. It is also known as Carové's Giant Dragonfly.

== Description ==
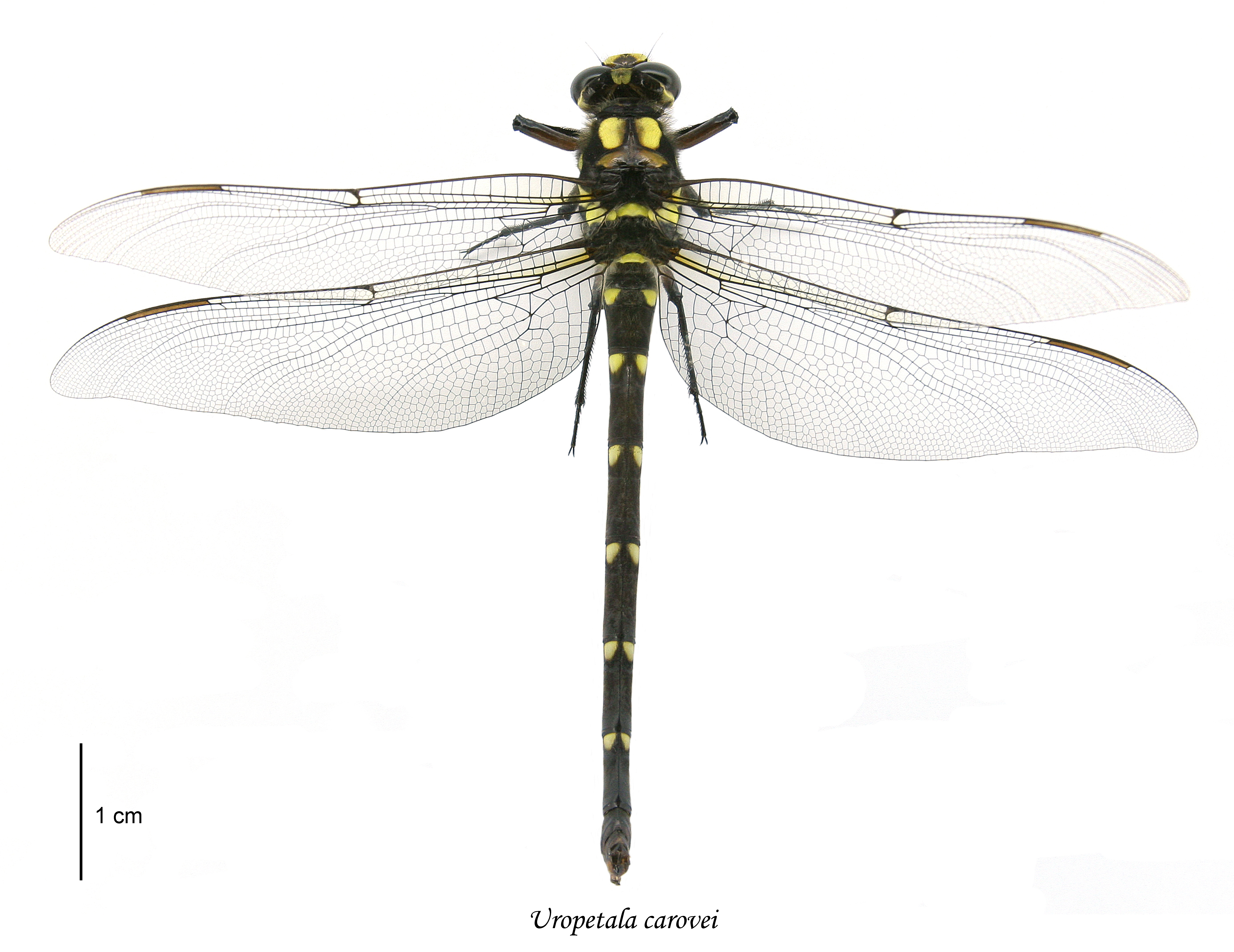
Dorsal view of Uropetala carovei

Its yellow and black body can be up to 95 millimetres (3.7 in) long, with a wingspan up to 130 millimetres (5.1 in), making it the largest dragonfly in New Zealand. Females are slightly larger than males. The bodies of both the female and male are dark brown, with pale spots on the abdomen and thorax. Males have petal-shaped appendages at the tip of the abdomen. Uropetala carovei can be distinguished from the similar Uropetala chiltoni, which occurs in the mountains of the South Island, by its all-black labrum (lacking the large pale blotch on Uropetala chiltoni), and its brown to yellowish leg femur segments (which are black in Uropetala chiltoni).

== Taxonomy ==
Uropetala carovei was first described by Adam White in 1843 and originally named Petalura carovei. The Natural History Museum, London holds the type material (Rowe 1987).

== Distribution and habitat ==
This species is found throughout New Zealand, mostly in western parts of each island, and especially on the West Coast. They are found in damp areas of native forest.

== Breeding ==
Breeding takes place on the banks of forest streams, or near springs. Males establish and aggressively defend territories during the breeding season. After copulation takes place, the female lays eggs on shaded banks of streams, and attaches eggs to clumps of moss, using her ovipositor.

The larval stage (nymph or naiad) tunnels into the soft earth of a stream bank or seepage, where they occupy a chamber half-filled with water for about five years. They emerge at night to seek prey near the burrow entrance. They are sensitive to disturbance so are rarely observed.

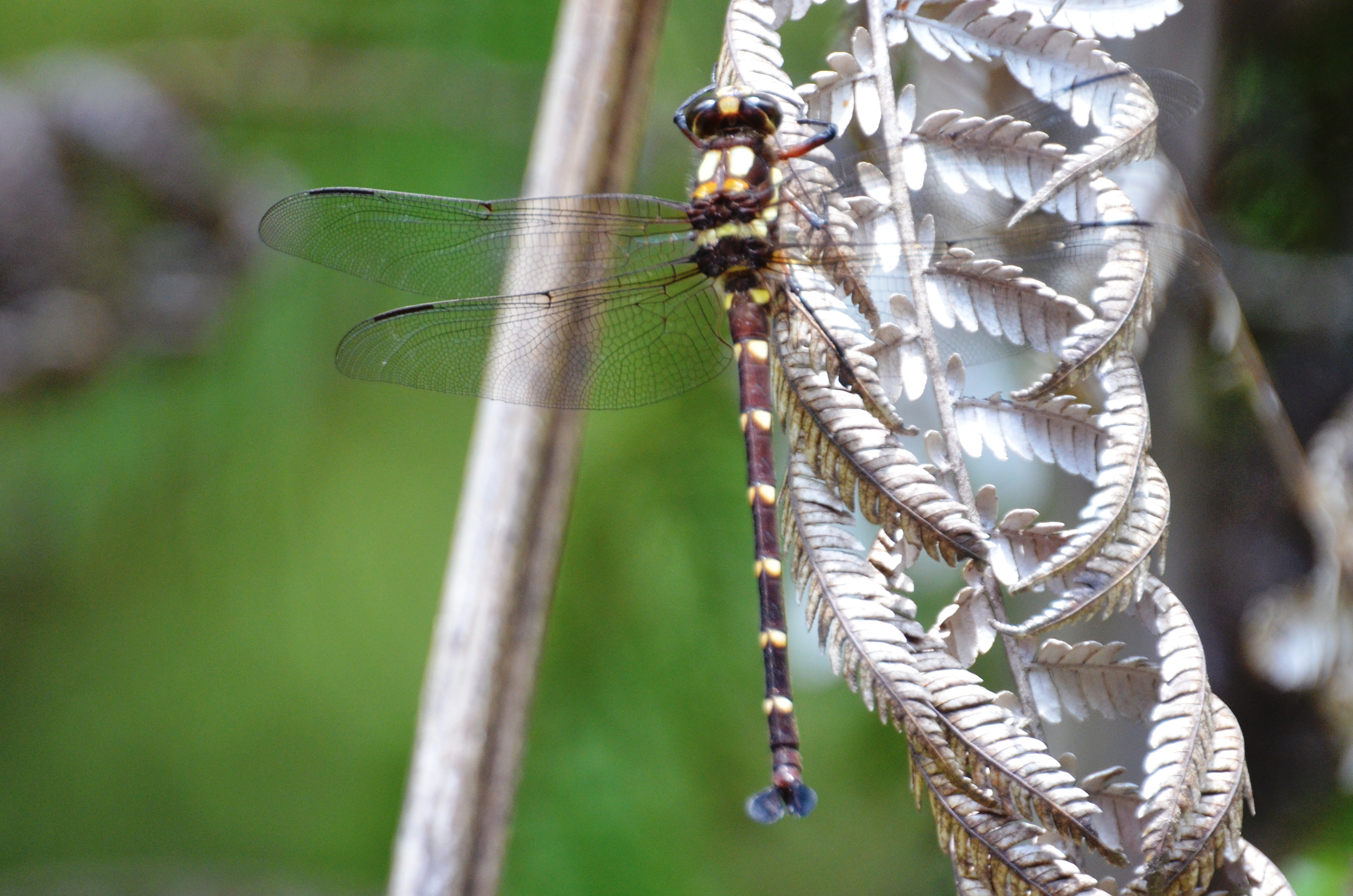
Uropetala carovei perching on vegetation

== Prey and predators ==
Adults feed on smaller insects, including butterflies, cicadas and wasps which they can eat on the wing.

The nymph stage of U. carovei is preyed on by weka and feral cats. Adults are predated by rats, kingfishers.

== Conservation status ==
As of 2018, the New Zealand Threat Classification System lists the status of Uropetala carovei as Not Threatened. Its IUCN status is Least Concern.

== In Māori culture ==
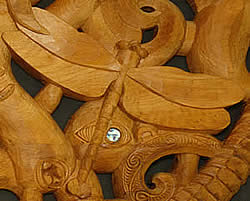
Uropetala carved into the pare or lintel of a traditional Māori building.

The Ngāti Rongomai iwi of the Rotorua region have a special association with the kapokapowai through oral history that describes huge numbers of dragonflies coming to the aid of a leader Rakeiao, and helping him defeat enemies in battle by flying into the faces, eyes and noses of his opponents.
