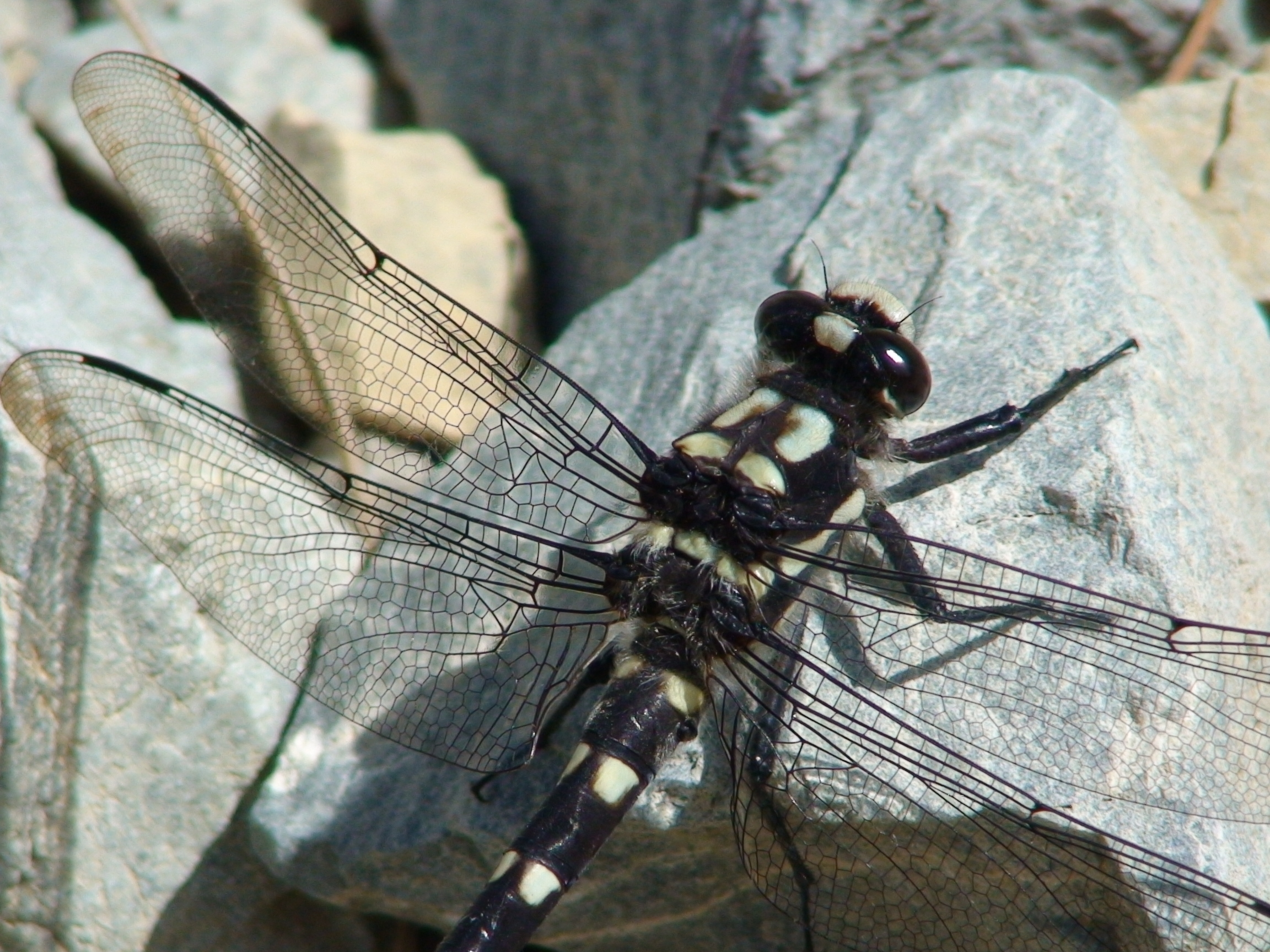
- Uropetala chiltoni

Scientific classification
- Kingdom: Animalia
- Phylum: Arthropoda
- Clade: Pancrustacea
- Class: Insecta
- Order: Odonata
- Suborder: Anisoptera
- Family: Petaluridae
- Subfamily: Petalurinae
- Genus: Uropetala; Selys, 1858

= Uropetala =

Genus of dragonflies

Uropetala is a small genus of very large dragonflies in the family Petaluridae. They are endemic to New Zealand. Unlike most dragonflies, the larvae are not aquatic, but terrestrial, living in flooded burrows in damp forest or banks.

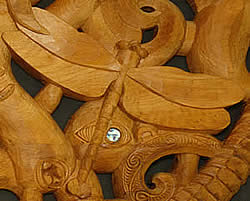
Uropetala dragonfly carved on a Māori pare or lintel.

The genus contains only two species:

- Uropetala carovei (White, 1843) – bush giant dragonfly
- Uropetala chiltoni Tillyard, 1921 – mountain giant dragonfly
