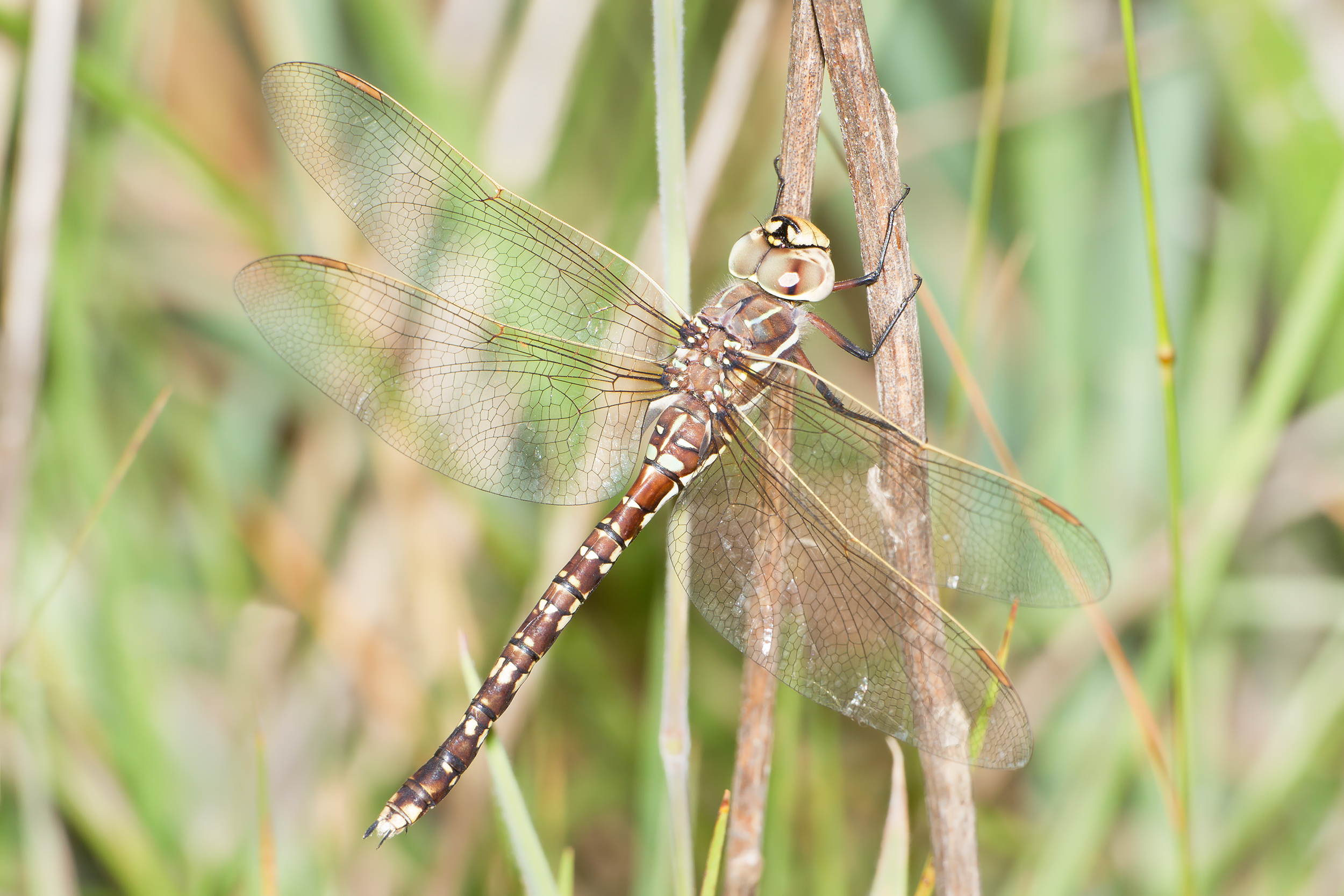
- Female
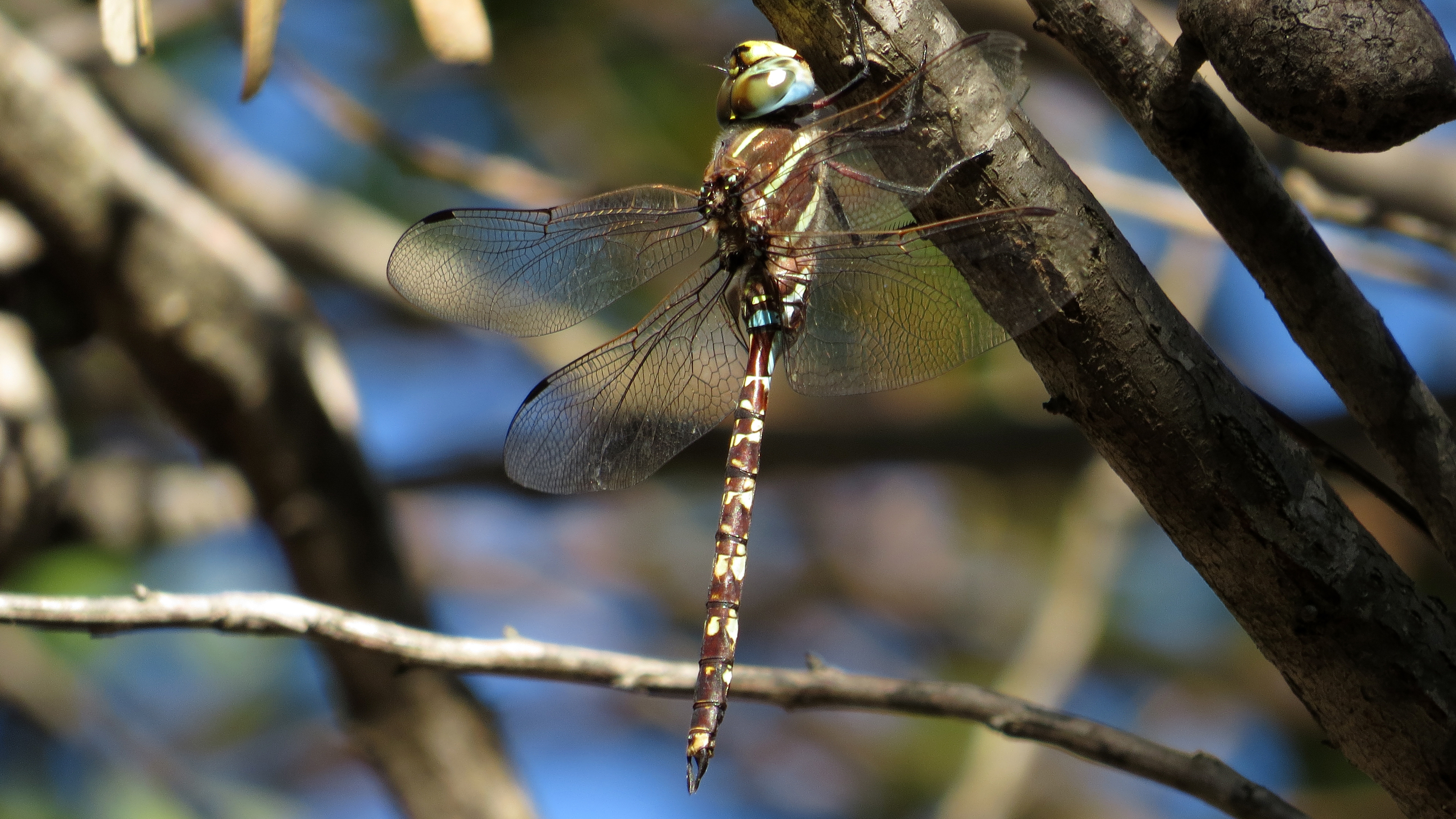
- Male

Conservation status
- Least Concern (IUCN 3.1)

Scientific classification
- Kingdom: Animalia
- Phylum: Arthropoda
- Clade: Pancrustacea
- Class: Insecta
- Order: Odonata
- Infraorder: Anisoptera
- Family: Aeshnidae
- Genus: Adversaeschna; Watson, 1992
- Species: A. brevistyla

Binomial name
- Adversaeschna brevistyla (Rambur, 1842)

Synonyms
- Aeschna brevistyla Rambur, 1842

= Blue-spotted hawker =

Species of dragonfly

The blue-spotted hawker (Adversaeschna brevistyla) is the only known species of dragonfly of the genus Adversaeschna in the family Aeshnidae. They are also known as the Lancer Dragonfly. Their scientific name was formerly Aeschna brevistyla but was relatively recently changed to be Adversaeschna brevistyla

== Appearance ==
The blue-spotted hawker is a large dragonfly with a pair of pale stripes on either side of the thorax. At the base of the thorax, they have two symmetrical bright-blue stripes. The fore-edges of the wings are a pale orange with the color ending at the pterostigma, which is a reddish-brown. Mature males have blue eyes whilst females have brown eyes.

== Distribution and Habitat ==
The blue-spotted hawker is widespread across Australia, New Zealand and some Pacific Islands.

It may be found near ponds and marshes as well as vegetation far from water. It prefers still water but may also be found along calm streams.

== Conservation Status ==
As of 2019, they were marked as least concern in their risk of being threatened.

== Etymology ==
The genus name Adversaeschna combines the Latin adversus ("opposite" or "set apart") with -aeschna, a suffix commonly used for dragonflies associated with the Aeshna group. The name refers to the isolated taxonomic position of this genus.

The species name brevistyla is derived from the Latin brevis ("short") and stylus ("stake" or "pointed instrument"), referring to the short appendages, historically referred to as styli.

== Gallery ==
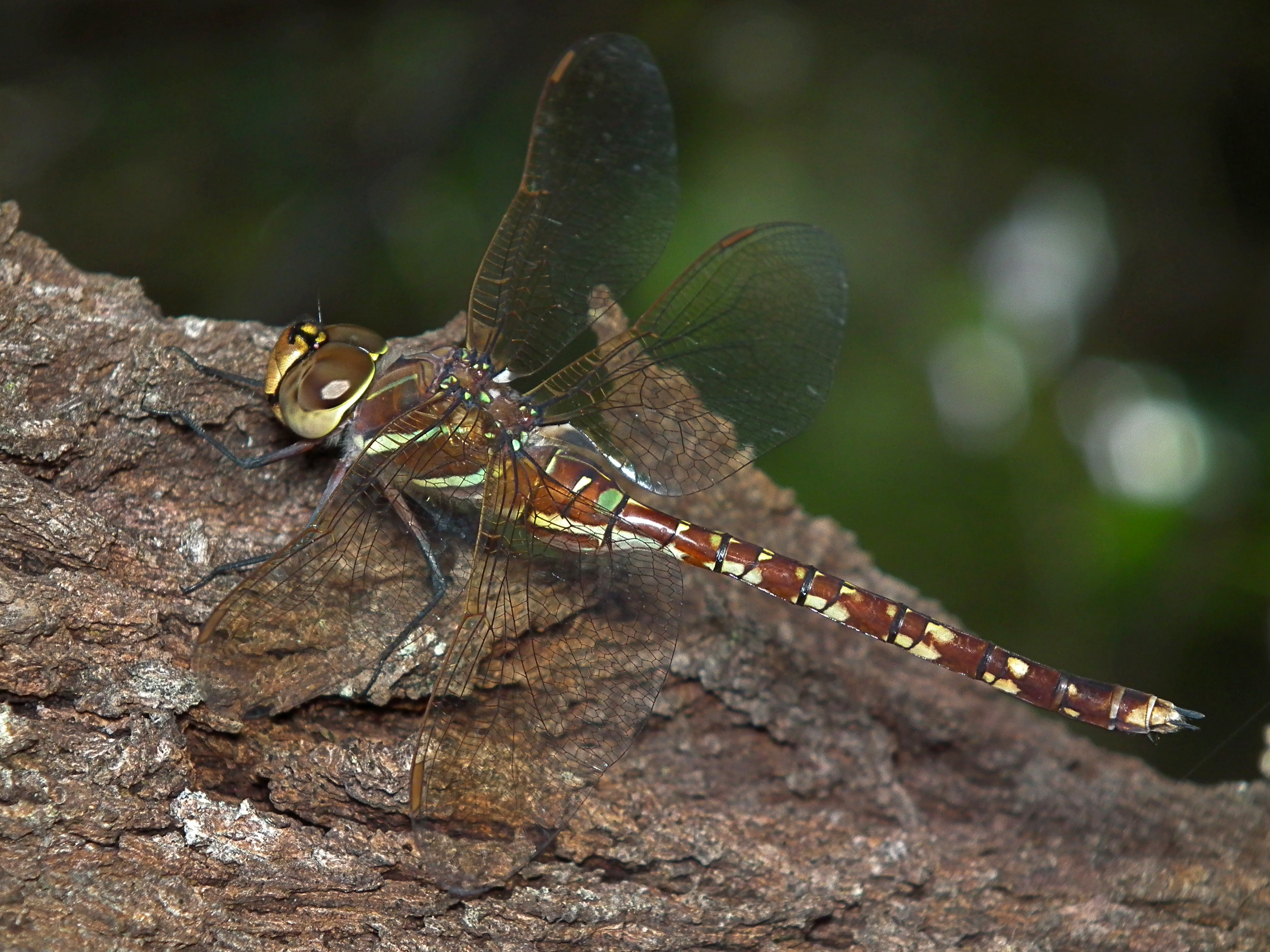
Female side view

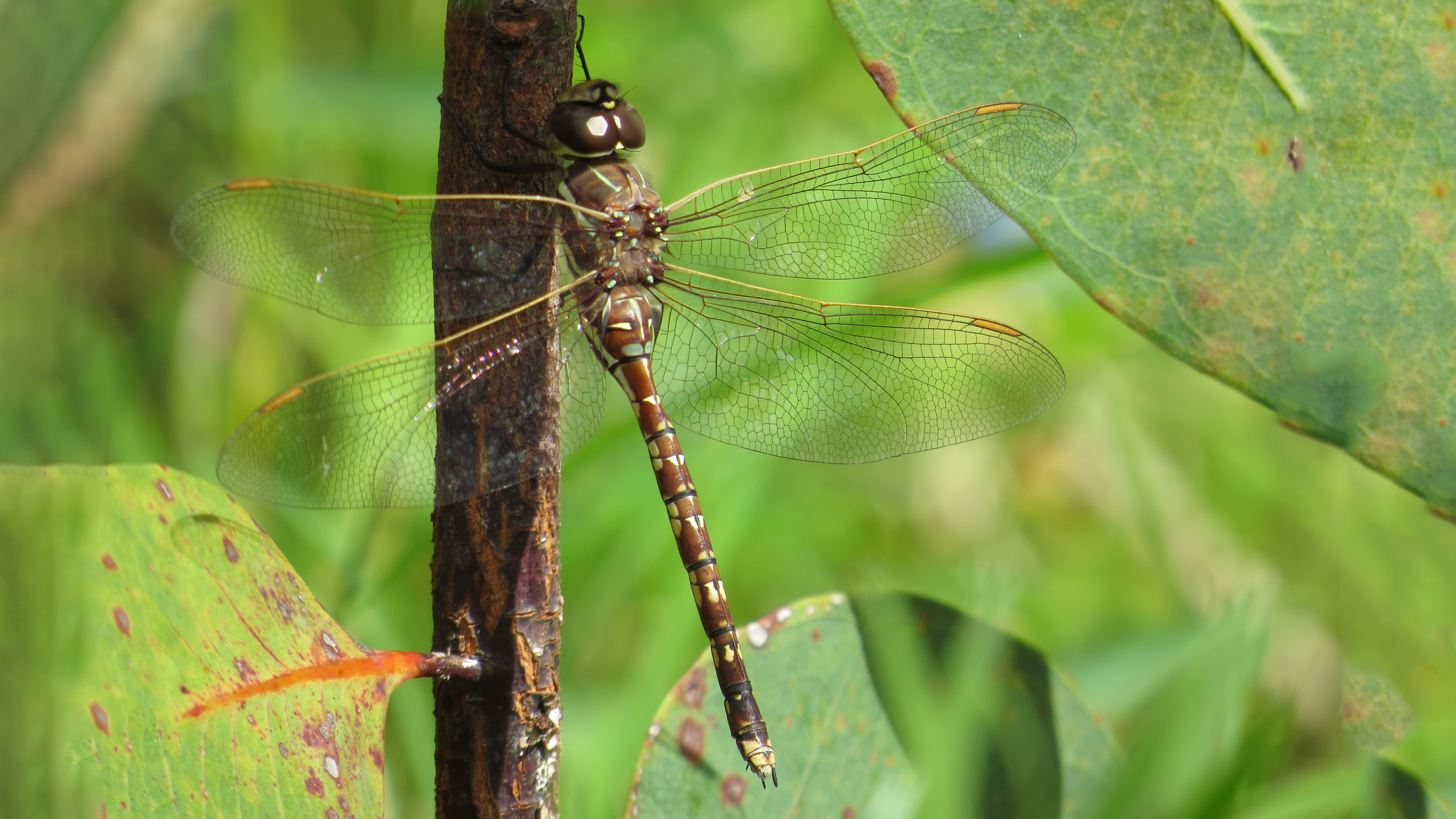
Female

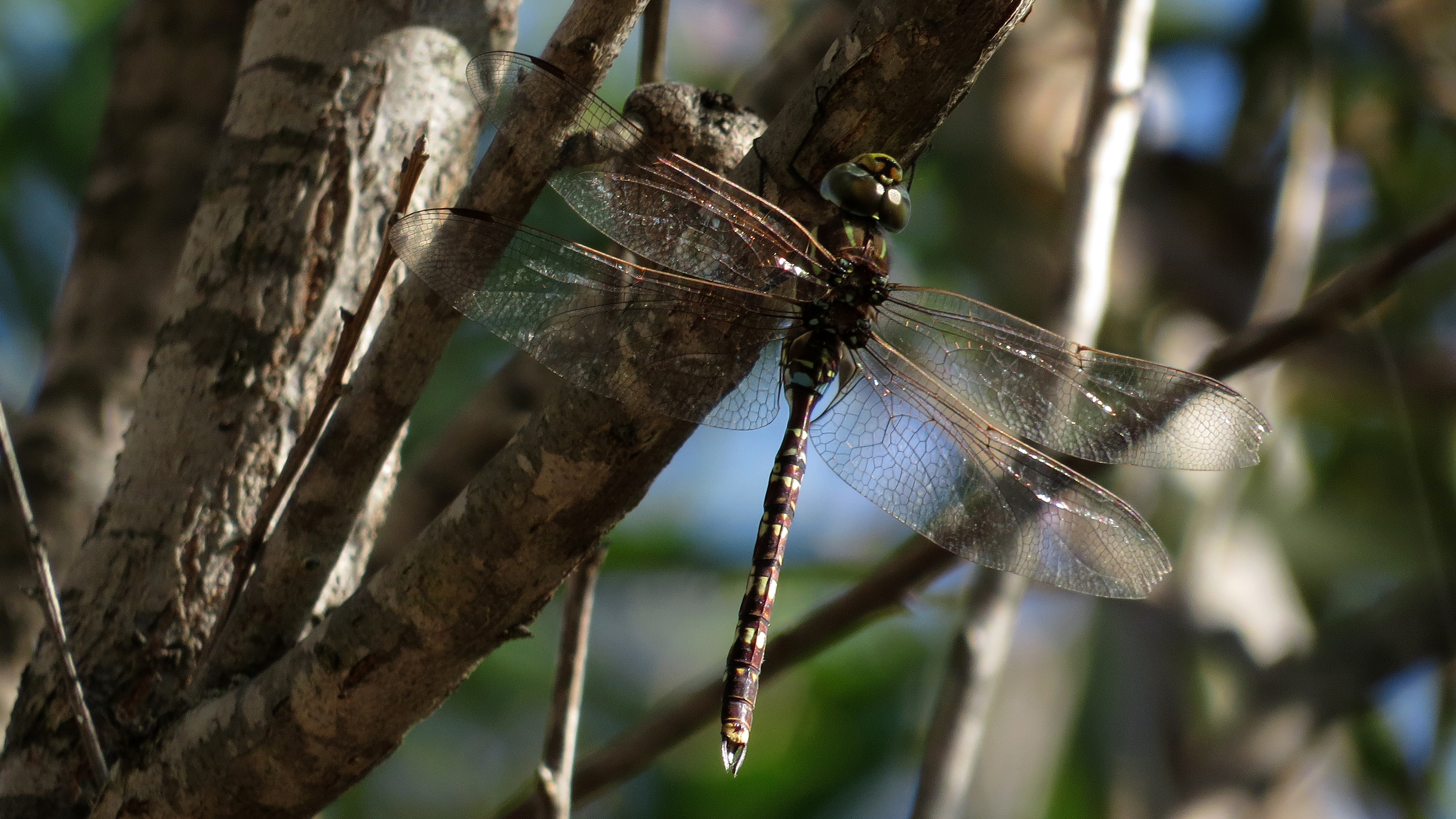
Male

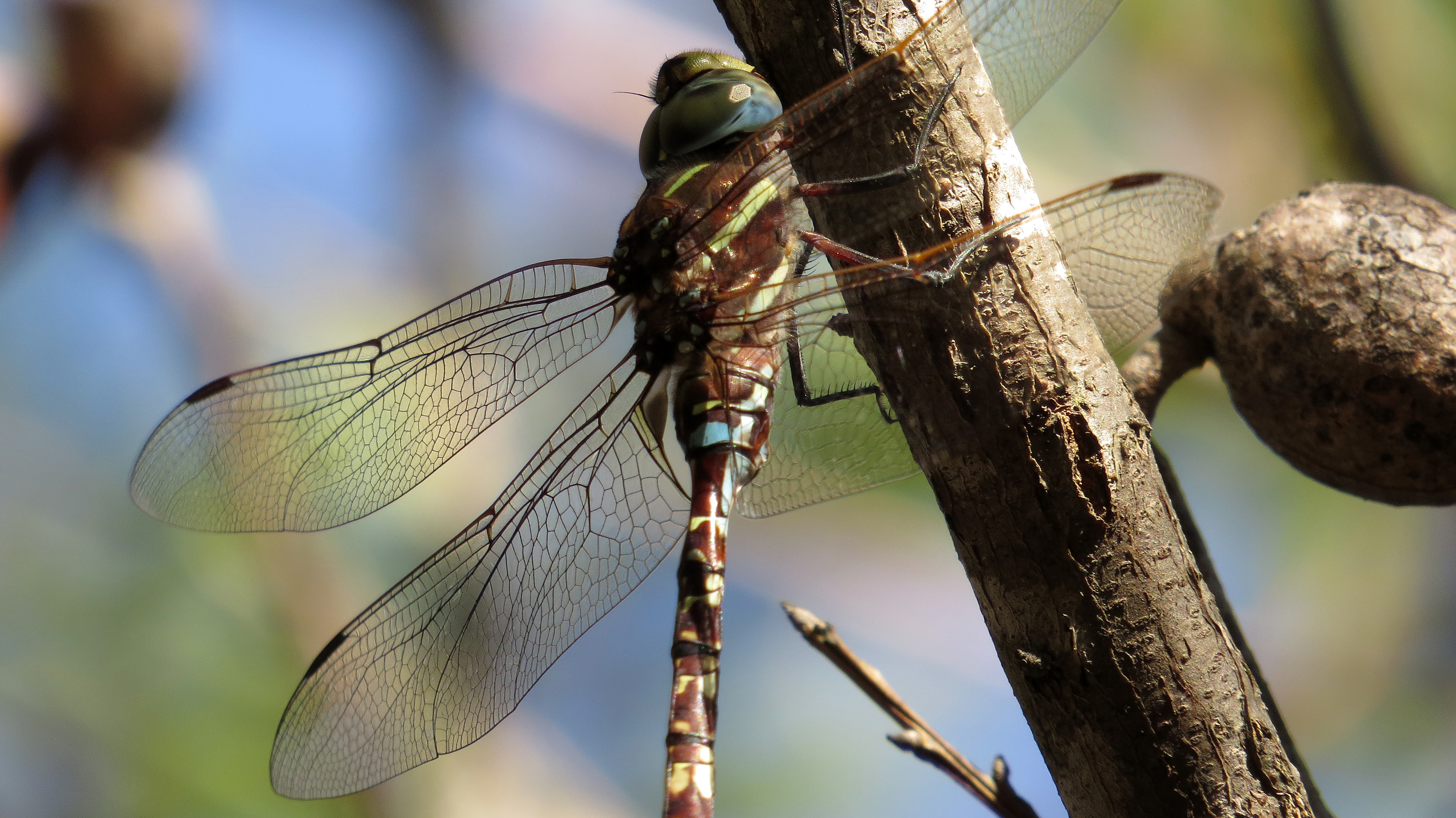
Male body detail

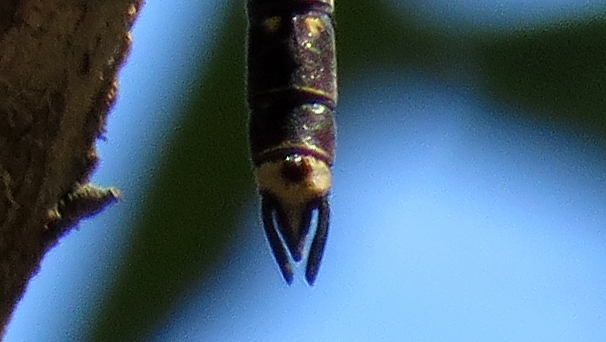
Male terminal abdominal appendages

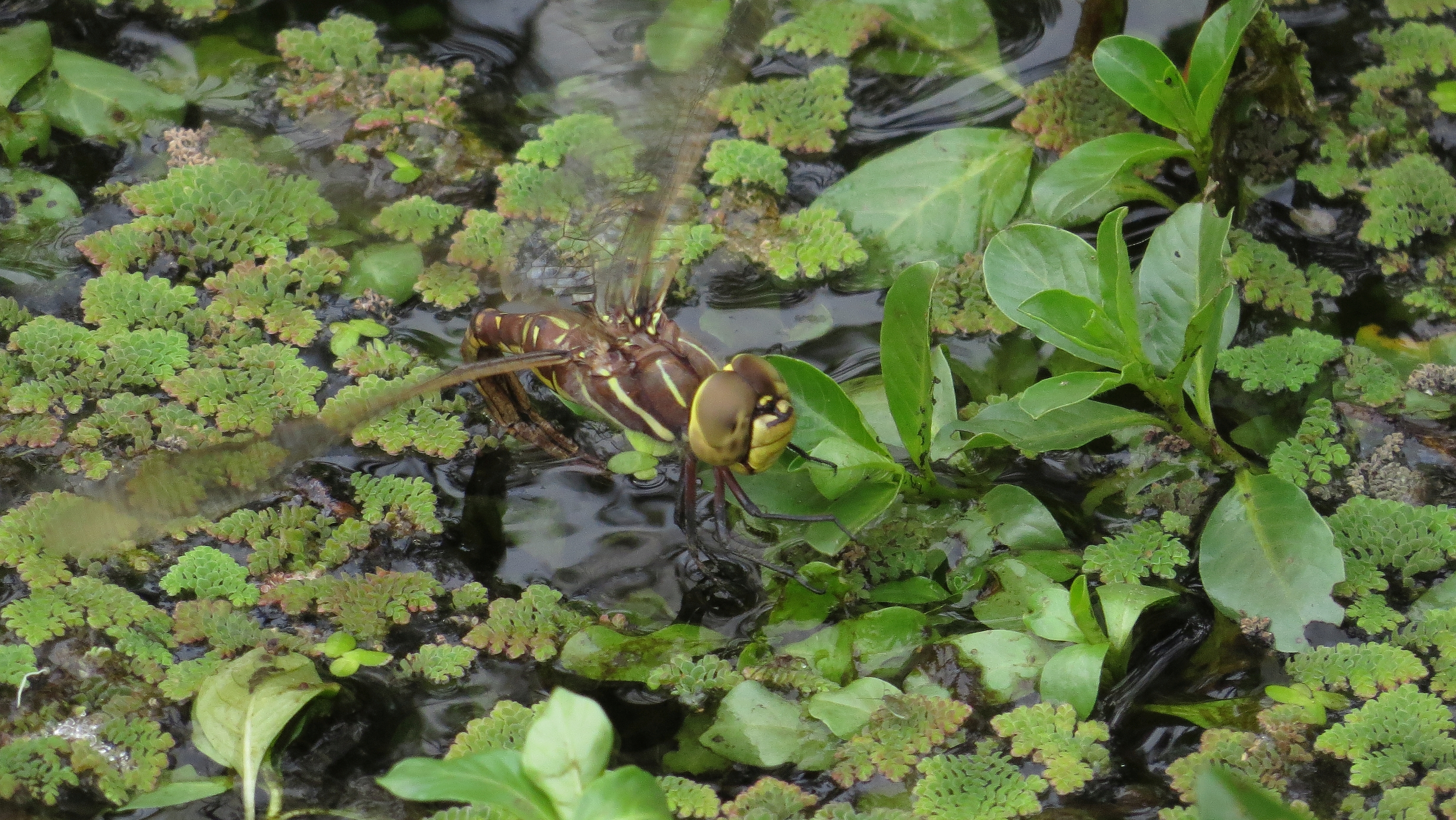
Female ovipositing, depositing her eggs in a dam

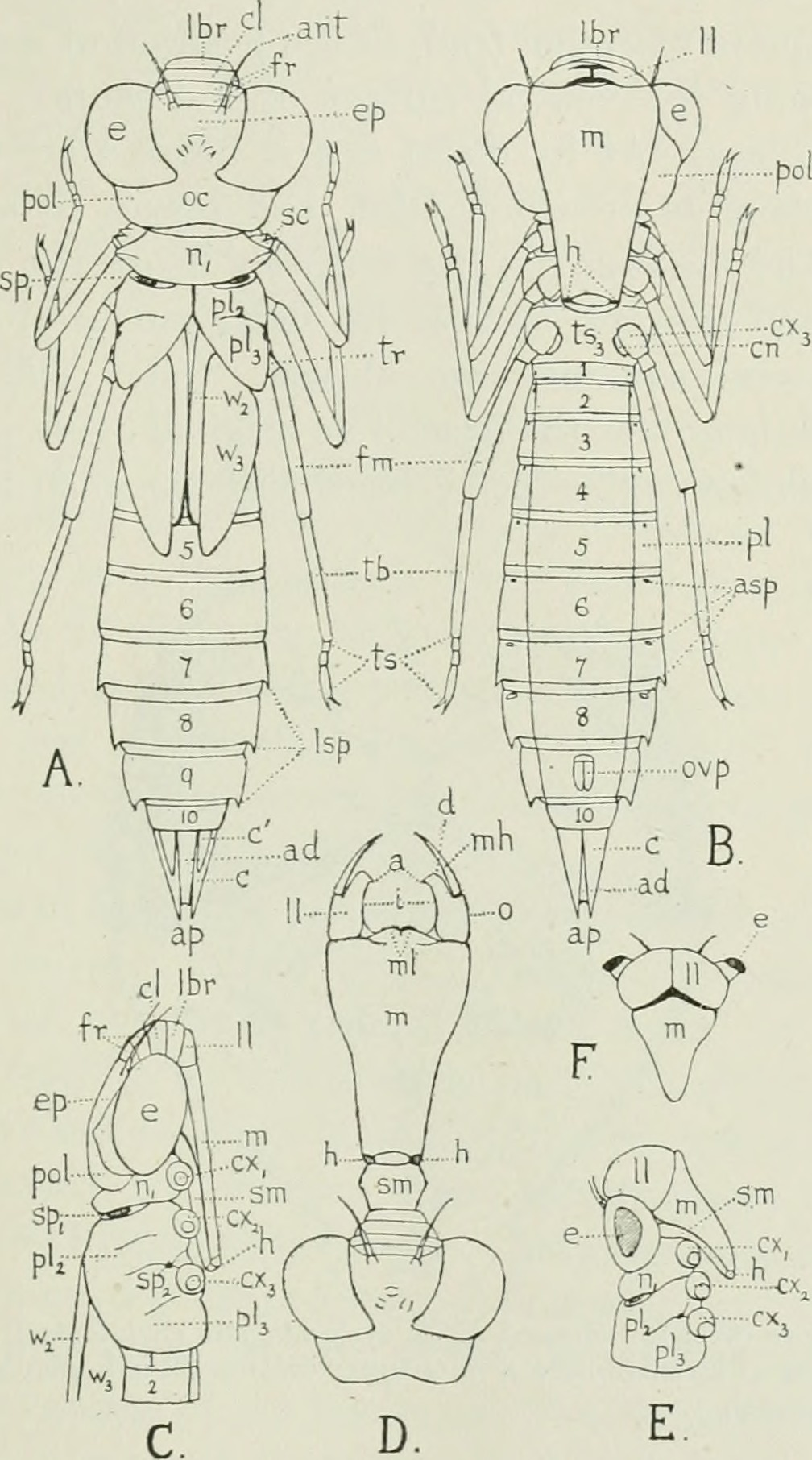
Larva

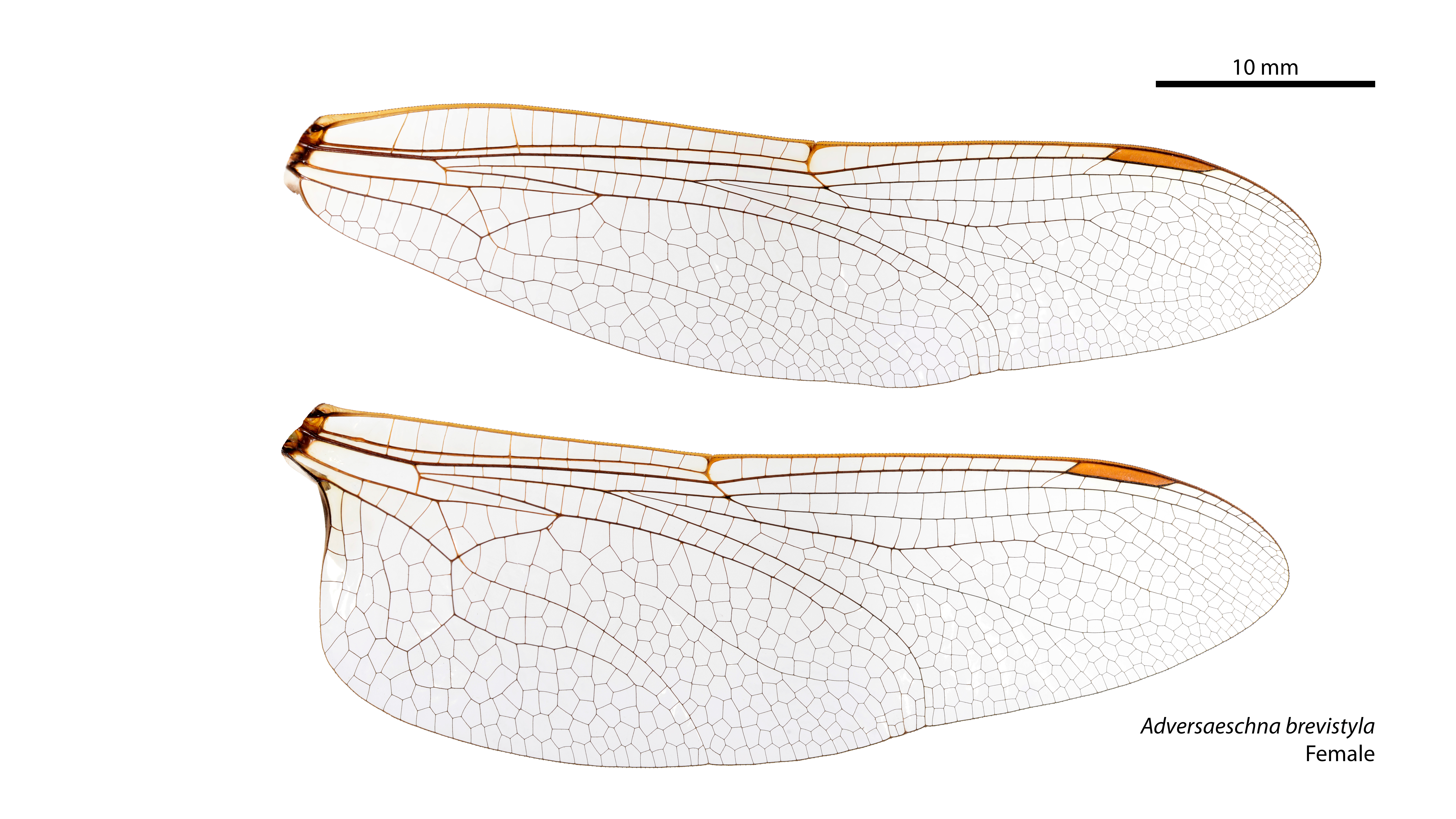
Female wings

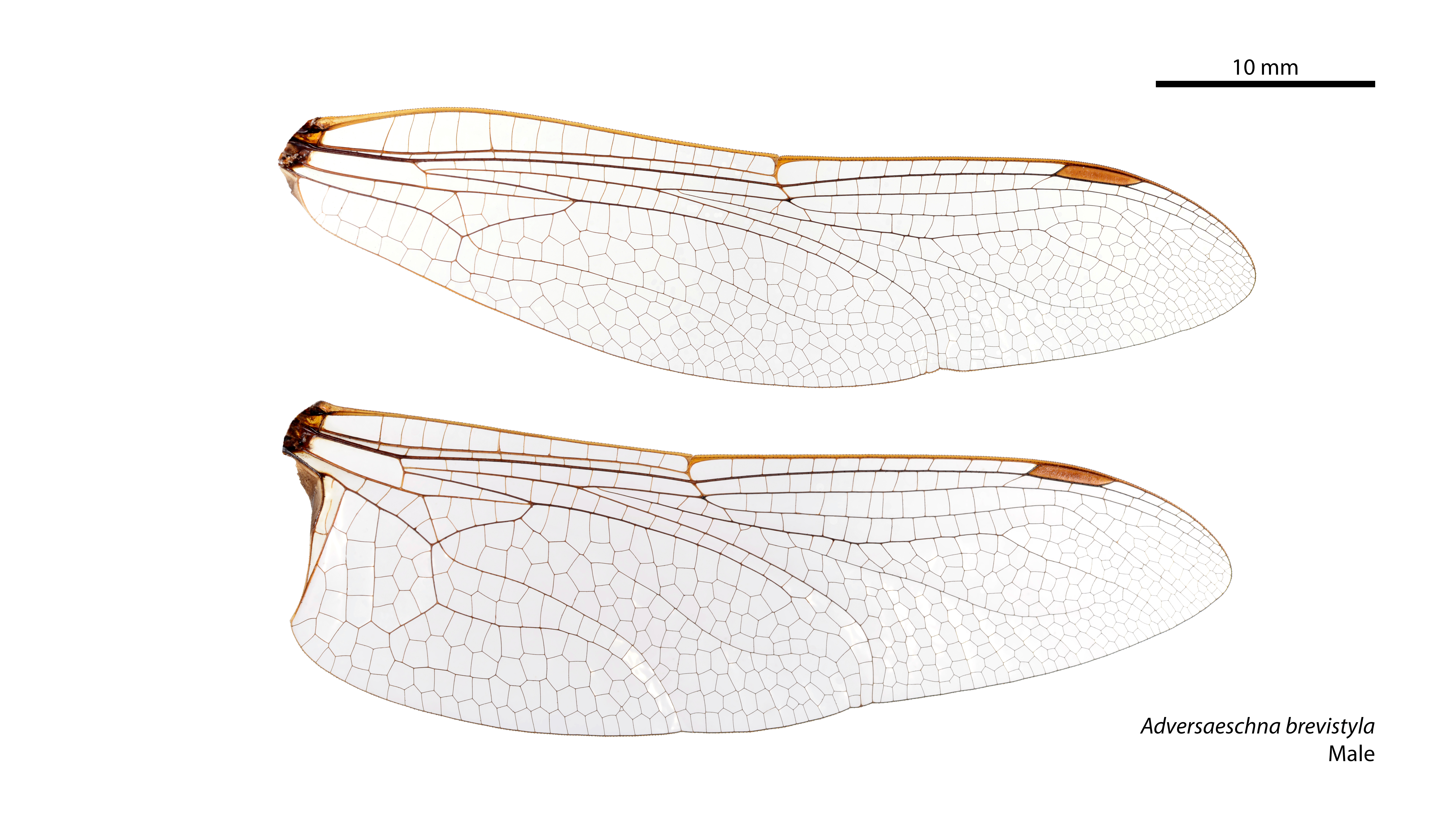
Male wings
