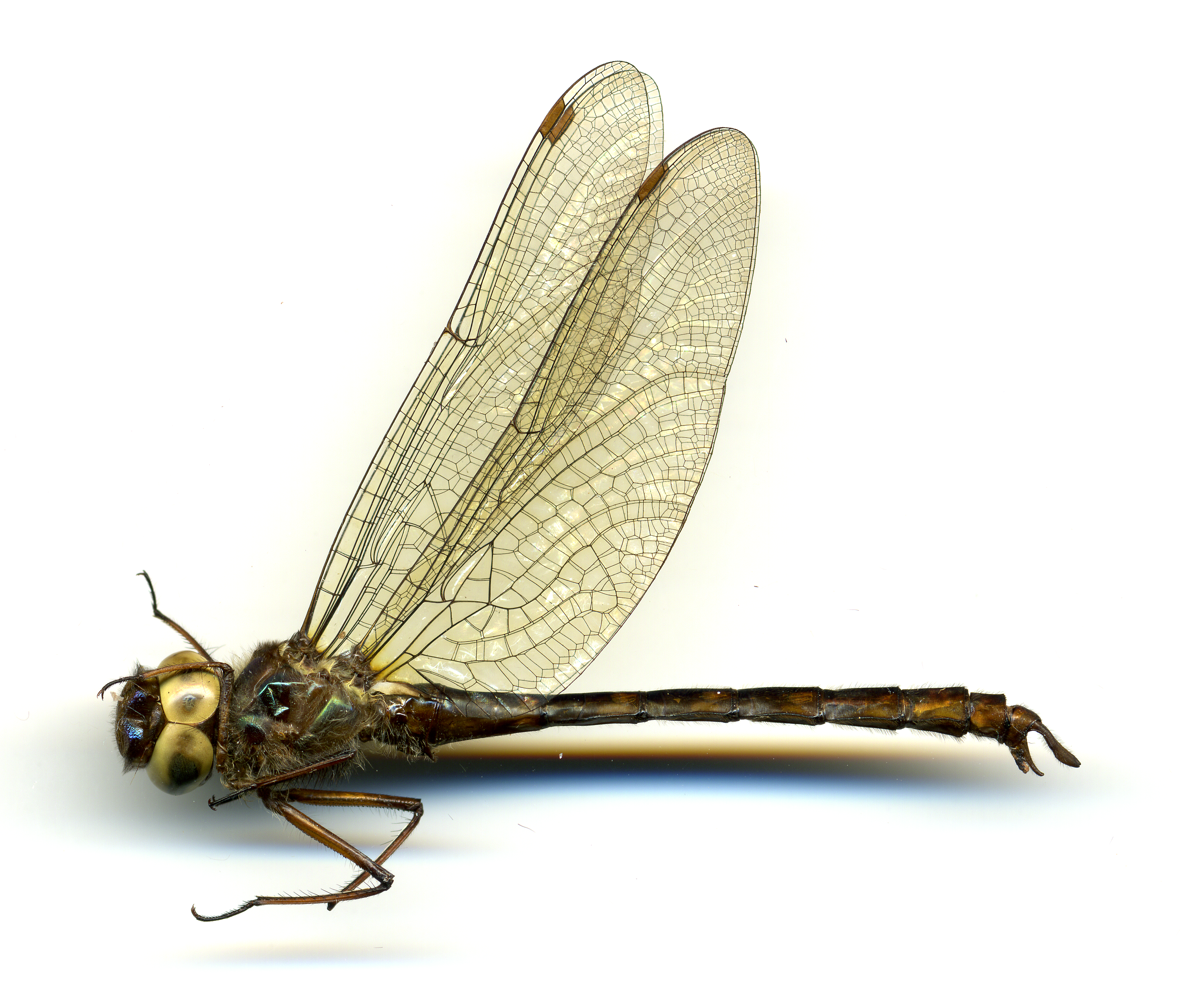

Conservation status
- Least Concern (IUCN 3.1)

- Naturally Uncommon (NZ TCS)

Scientific classification
- Kingdom: Animalia
- Phylum: Arthropoda
- Clade: Pancrustacea
- Class: Insecta
- Order: Odonata
- Infraorder: Anisoptera
- Family: Corduliidae
- Genus: Antipodochlora
- Species: A. braueri

Binomial name
- Antipodochlora braueri (Selys, 1871)

= Antipodochlora braueri =

Species of dragonfly

Antipodochlora braueri (dusk dragonfly) is a species of dragonfly in the family Corduliidae. It is endemic to New Zealand. Its natural habitat is rivers.

The colour pattern of Antipodochlora braueri causes them to blend into their surroundings. When they can be observed, their varying wing patterns make them difficult to classify.

== Description ==
The dusk dragonfly is the largest corduliid species in New Zealand. Adults of the species are dark brown in colour and tend to fly in shade during the day, becoming more active in the afternoon and dusk. Adults can be distinguished from other corduliid dragonflies by the colour patterns on the abdomen.

== Taxonomy ==
Antipodochlora braueri was first described by Selyn. Redescribed by Frederic Charles Fraser in 1939

== Conservation status ==
As of 2018, this species has been classified as Naturally Uncommon under the New Zealand Threat Classification System.
