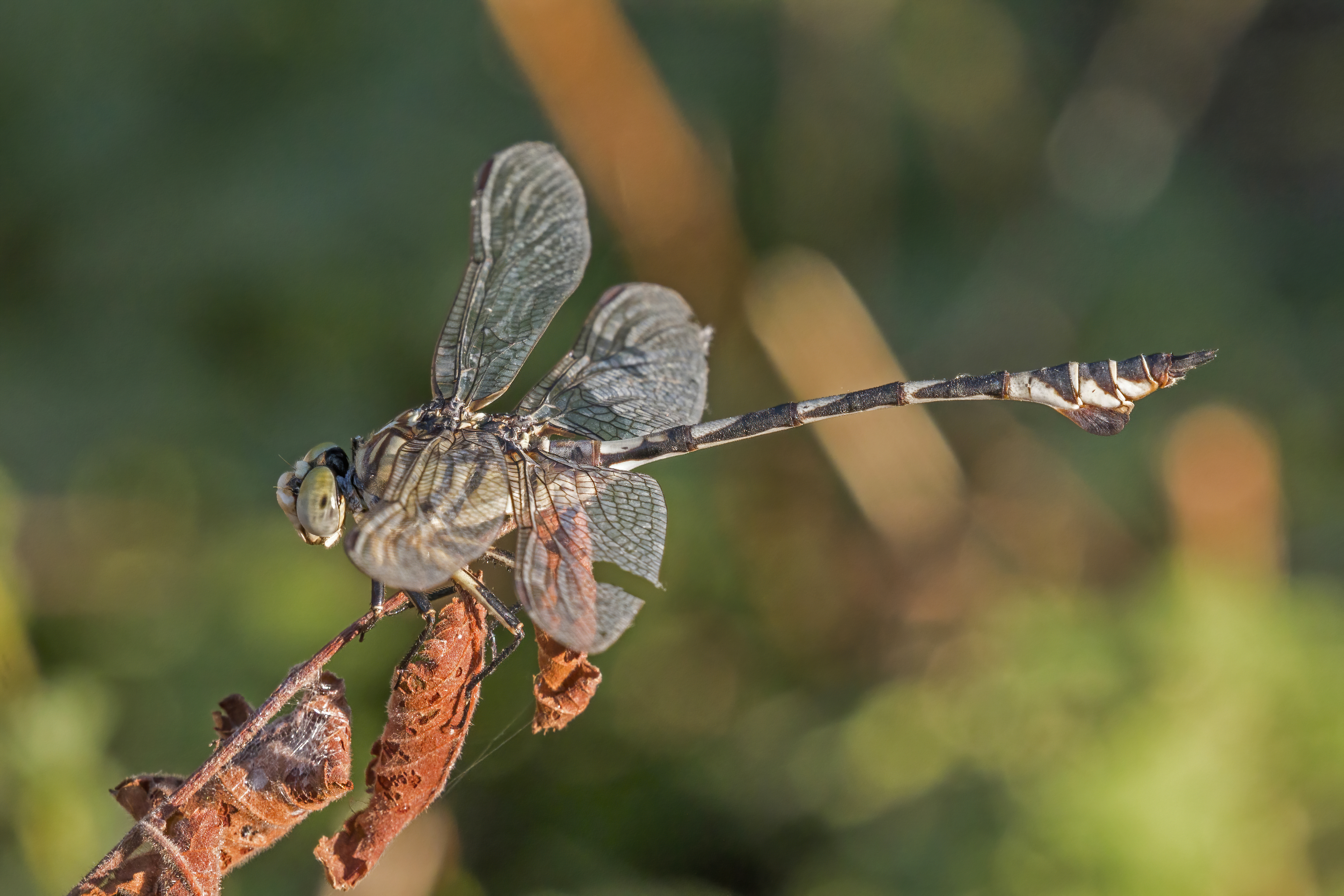
- Bladetail, male, Lindenia tetraphylla North Macedonia

Scientific classification
- Kingdom: Animalia
- Phylum: Arthropoda
- Clade: Pancrustacea
- Class: Insecta
- Order: Odonata
- Infraorder: Anisoptera
- Superfamily: Gomphoidea; Rambur, 1842

Families
- Gomphidae; Petaluridae

= Gomphoidea =

Gomphoidea Temporal range: Early Cretaceous (Barremian) to present

Superfamily of dragonflies

Gomphoidea is a superfamily of dragonflies comprising the families Gomphidae and Petaluridae. It contains 106 genera and about 1,000 species distributed worldwide. The superfamily was redefined in 2026 when molecular phylogenetic studies placed Petaluridae within Gomphoidea.

== Taxonomic history ==
Gomphoidea was established by Rambur in 1842 to accommodate the family Gomphidae.

Subsequent classifications generally recognised Gomphoidea as containing the family Gomphidae, while Petaluridae was treated as the sole family of Petaluroidea.

In 2026, Carter and colleagues revised the classification of extant Odonata, placing Petaluridae within Gomphoidea based on phylogenomic evidence. The superfamily is now recognised as comprising two extant families, Gomphidae and Petaluridae, a classification that has subsequently been adopted by the World Odonata List.

== Families ==
The following families are currently placed in Gomphoidea:

- Gomphidae Rambur, 1842
- Petaluridae Needham, 1903

== Phylogeny ==
Molecular phylogenetic studies consistently recover Gomphoidea as one of the four principal superfamilies of extant dragonflies. In the classification proposed by Carter and colleagues (2026), the superfamily comprises two sister families, Petaluridae and Gomphidae.

- Gomphoidea
  - Petaluridae
  - Gomphidae

== Fossil record ==
Fossils attributable to Gomphidae and Petaluridae are known from the Mesozoic onwards. Gomphidae has an extensive fossil record from the Late Jurassic to the Quaternary, whereas the earliest confirmed petalurid is †Argentinopetala from the Early Cretaceous of Argentina.

=== Fossil families ===
Several extinct families have also been assigned to Gomphoidea in fossil classifications. The higher-level relationships of these fossils remain under active study, and recent palaeontological classifications commonly employ phylogenetic clades that do not correspond directly to the Linnaean superfamily framework used for extant Odonata.

- †Araripegomphidae Bechly, 1996
- †Burmagomphidae Zheng et al., 2017
- †Libanogomphidae Azar & Nel, 2023
- †Paraburmagomphidae Zheng et al., 2018
- †Proterogomphidae Bechly et al., 1998

== Etymology ==
The superfamily name Gomphoidea is derived from the type genus Gomphus, with the standard zoological suffix -oidea used for superfamilies.

The genus name Gomphus is derived from the Greek γόμφος (gomphos, "bolt" or "nail"), referring to the shape of the abdomen, likened to a bolt used in shipbuilding.
