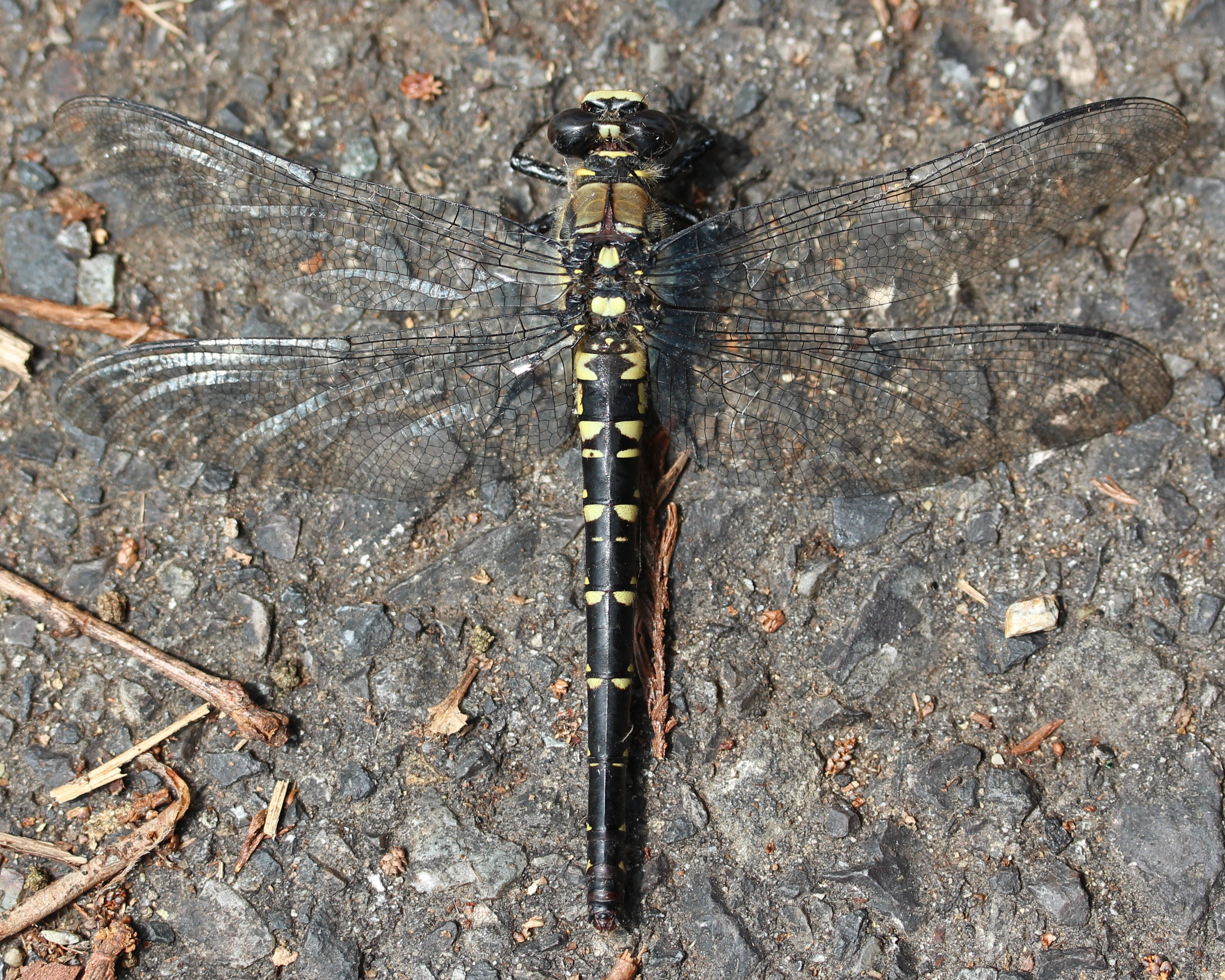
- Tanypteryx pryeri

Scientific classification
- Kingdom: Animalia
- Phylum: Arthropoda
- Clade: Pancrustacea
- Class: Insecta
- Order: Odonata
- Infraorder: Anisoptera
- Superfamily: Gomphoidea
- Family: Petaluridae; Needham, 1903

Genera
- Petalura; Phenes; Tachopteryx; Tanypteryx; Uropetala
- Distribution of Petaluridae

= Petaluridae =

Petaluridae Temporal range: Early Cretaceous (Barremian) to present

Family of dragonflies

Petaluridae is a family of dragonflies, commonly known as petaltails or graybacks.

They comprise eleven extant species in five genera distributed across Australia, New Zealand, Chile, Japan and North America.

Petalurids are among the oldest surviving dragonfly lineages and are notable for their large size and unusual semiterrestrial larvae, which typically live in burrows or wet seepage habitats rather than fully aquatic environments.

In the current classification of extant Odonata, Petaluridae is placed in the superfamily Gomphoidea. Earlier classifications recognised it as the sole extant family of Petaluroidea.

== Description and biology ==
Petalurids are among the largest living dragonflies. They are characterised by their robust bodies, well-separated eyes and, in most species, the males' large petal-shaped anal appendages from which the family takes its common name. Their wings have exceptionally long pterostigmas, and the adults are generally black, grey or brown with subdued cream or yellowish markings. Males and females are similar in appearance.

The largest species is the Australian Petalura ingentissima, with a wingspan of up to about 160 mm (6.3 in) and a body length of about 125 mm (4.9 in). Modern petalurids comprise eleven species in five genera distributed around the margins of the Pacific Basin, occurring in Australia, New Zealand, Chile, Japan and North America.

Petaltails inhabit seepages, bogs and stream margins, often where groundwater emerges through saturated soils. Unlike most dragonflies, the larvae are semiterrestrial. In most species they excavate deep burrows in wet soil, stream banks or seepages, where they may spend five years or more before emerging as adults. The larvae feed on terrestrial invertebrates that wander within reach of the burrow entrance. Species of Tachopteryx and Phenes are exceptions, with larvae that live beneath wet leaves or in shallow depressions rather than constructing burrows.

Adults generally remain close to their breeding sites but are powerful fliers. Some species perch suspended from vegetation, while others, such as Tachopteryx thoreyi, rest pressed against tree trunks or rocks where their colouration provides camouflage.

== Taxonomy ==
Needham established the subfamily Petalurinae in 1903; the family name Petaluridae is based on this name and retains Needham's authorship and date.

The following genera are currently placed in Petaluridae:

- Petalura Leach, 1815
- Phenes Rambur, 1842
- Tachopteryx Uhler in Selys, 1859
- Tanypteryx Kennedy, 1917
- Uropetala Selys, 1858

In the classification of extant Odonata proposed by Carter and colleagues (2026), Petaluridae is placed in the superfamily Gomphoidea. Earlier classifications recognised it as the sole extant family of Petaluroidea, which is now retained primarily for fossil taxa.

== Phylogeny ==
Molecular phylogenetic studies place Petaluridae as one of the earliest-diverging lineages of living dragonflies and recover it as the sister group to Gomphidae.

- Gomphoidea
  - Petaluridae
  - Gomphidae

In 2024, Tolman and colleagues identified two principal petalurid lineages: a Gondwanan lineage comprising the Southern Hemisphere genera, and a Laurasian lineage comprising the Northern Hemisphere genera, estimated to have diverged about 160 million years ago.

== Fossil record ==
The oldest confirmed member of the family is †Argentinopetala from the Early Cretaceous (Barremian) of Argentina.

Older Jurassic fossils have previously been assigned to Petaluridae, but these are now generally regarded as belonging to stem-group petaluroids or other extinct lineages and are no longer considered members of the crown family.

== Etymology ==
The family name Petaluridae is derived from the type genus Petalura, with the standard zoological suffix -idae used for families.

The genus name Petalura is derived from the Greek πέταλον (petalon, "leaf") and οὐρά (oura, "tail"), referring to the enlarged leaf-shaped appendages of the males.
