= List of Aeshnidae genera =

== A ==
Acanthaeschna Selys, 1883

- Acanthaeschna victoria Martin, 1901

Aeschnophlebia Selys, 1883

- †Aeschnophlebia andreasi Nel et al.
- Aeschnophlebia asahinai (Karube, 2011)
- Aeschnophlebia bachmaensis (Karube, 2002)
- Aeschnophlebia caudispina (Zhang & Cai, 2013)
- Aeschnophlebia celia (Wilson & Reels, 2001)
- Aeschnophlebia chiengmaiensis (Asahina, 1981)
- Aeschnophlebia crux (Kompier et al., 2021)
- Aeschnophlebia cucphuongensis (Karube, 1999)
- Aeschnophlebia gressitti (Karube, 2002)
- Aeschnophlebia haui (Wilson & Xu, 2008)
- Aeschnophlebia intersedens (Martin, 1909)
- Aeschnophlebia ishigakiana (Asahina, 1951)
- Aeschnophlebia laoshanensis (Zhang, Yeh & Tong, 2010)
- Aeschnophlebia liui (Xu, Chen & Qiu, 2009)
- Aeschnophlebia maculifrons (Zhang & Cai, 2013)
- Aeschnophlebia maolanensis (Zhou & Bao, 2002)
- †Aeschnophlebia miocenica Nel & Escuillé 1994
- Aeschnophlebia milnei (Selys, 1883)
- Aeschnophlebia monticola (Zhang & Cai, 2013)
- Aeschnophlebia nankunshanensis (Zhang, Yeh & Tong, 2010)
- Aeschnophlebia nanlingensis (Wilson & Xu, 2008)
- Aeschnophlebia owadai (Karube, 2002)
- Aeschnophlebia poumai (Joshi & Kunte, 2017)
- Aeschnophlebia risi (Asahina, 1964)
- Aeschnophlebia robusta (Zhang & Cai, 2013)
- Aeschnophlebia samurai (Kompier et al., 2021)
- Aeschnophlebia shanxiensis (Zhu & Zhang, 2001)
- Aeschnophlebia skiaperipola (Wilson & Xu, 2008)
- Aeschnophlebia suichangensis (Zhou & Wei, 1980)
- Aeschnophlebia taiwana (Asahina, 1951)
- Aeschnophlebia tamdaoensis (Asahina, 1996)
- Aeschnophlebia tomokunii (Asahina, 1996)
- Aeschnophlebia tsuchi (Kompier et al., 2021)
- Aeschnophlebia viridis (Karube, 2004)

Aeshna Fabricius, 1775

- †Aeschna acrodonta Chang & Sun, 2005
- Aeshna affinis Vander Linden, 1820
- †Aeshna andancensi Nel & Brisac, 1994
- Aeshna annulata Fabricius, 1798 (doubtful species)
- Aeshna athalia Needham, 1930
- Aeshna brevistyla Rambur, 1842
- Aeshna caerulea (Ström, 1783)
- Aeshna canadensis Walker, 1908
- †Aeshna caseneuvensis Nel et al., 2022
- †Aeshna cerdanica Nel & Martínez-Delclòs, 1994
- Aeshna clepsydra Say, 1840
- Aeshna constricta Say, 1840
- Aeshna crenata Hagen, 1856
- Aeshna cyanea (Müller, 1764)
- †Aeschna dido Hagen, 1863
- Aeshna eremita Scudder, 1866
- †Aeshna forficatum Li et al., 2011
- Aeshna frontalis Navás, 1936
- †Aeshna ghiandonii Gentilini & Peters, 1993
- Aeshna grandis (Linnaeus, 1758)
- †Aeshna heterofasciata Theobald, 1937
- †Aeshna ignivora Zhang, 1989
- Aeshna interrupta Walker, 1908
- Aeshna juncea (Linnaeus, 1758)
- †Aeshna larvata Scudder, 1890
- †Aeshna messiniana Gentilini & Peters, 1993
- Aeshna mixta Latreille, 1805
- †Aeshna multicellulata Gentilini & Peters, 1993
- †Aeshna oligocenica Nel, 1994
- †Aeschna ollivieri Nel, 1986
- †Aeshna paleocyanea Nel, 1987
- Aeshna palmata Hagen, 1856
- Aeshna persephone Donnelly, 1961
- Aeshna petalura Martin, 1908
- Aeshna septentrionalis Burmeister, 1839
- Aeshna serrata Hagen, 1856
- †Aeshna shanwangensis Li et al., 2011
- Aeshna shennong Zhang & Cai, 2014
- Aeshna sitchensis Hagen, 1861
- †Aeshna solida Scudder, 1890
- Aeshna soneharai Asahina, 1988
- †Aeshna stavropolensis Nel et al., 2005
- Aeshna subarctica Walker, 1908
- †Aeshna theobaldi Piton, 1935
- Aeshna tuberculifera Walker, 1908
- †Aeshna turoliana Riou & Nel, 1995
- †Aeshna tyche Heer, 1849
- Aeshna umbrosa Walker, 1908
- Aeshna vercanica Schneider et al., 2015
- Aeshna verticalis Hagen, 1861
- Aeshna viridis Eversmann, 1836
- †Aeschna vosendorfensis Papp & Mandl, 1951
- Aeshna walkeri Kennedy, 1917
- Aeshna wiliamsoniana Calvert, 1905
- †Aeshna zlatkokvaceki Prokop et al., 2016

Afroaeschna Peters & Theischinger, 2011

- Afroaeschna scotias (Pinhey, 1952)

Agyrtacantha Lieftinck, 1937

- Agyrtacantha browni Marinov & Theischinger, 2012
- Agyrtacantha dirupta (Karsch, 1889)
- Agyrtacantha microstigma (Selys, 1878)
- Agyrtacantha othello Lieftinck, 1942
- Agyrtacantha picta Theischinger & Richards, 2019
- Agyrtacantha tumidula Lieftinck, 1937

†Alloaeschna Wighton & Wilson, 1986

- †Alloaeschna paskapooensis Wighton & Wilson, 1986

Allopetalia Selys, 1873

- Allopetalia pustuloso Selys, 1873
- Allopetalia reticulosa Selys, 1873

Amphiaeschna Selys, 1871

- Amphiaeschna ampla (Rambur, 1842)

Anaciaeschna Selys, 1878

- Anaciaeschna jaspidea (Burmeister, 1839)
- Anaciaeschna martini (Selys, 1897)
- Anaciaeschna megalopis Martin, 1908
- Anaciaeschna melanostoma Lieftinck, 1949
- Anaciaeschna moluccana Lieftinck, 1930
- Anaciaeschna montivagans Lieftinck, 1932
- Anaciaeschna triangulifera McLachlan, 1896

Anax Leach in Brewster, 1815

- Anax amazili (Burmeister, 1839)
- Anax aurantiacus Makbun, Wongkamhaeng & Keetapitchchayakul, 2022
- Anax bangweuluensis Kimmins, 1955
- †Anax charpentieri Hagen, 1848
- Anax chloromelas Ris, 1911
- Anax concolor Brauer, 1865
- Anax congoliath Fraser, 1953
- †Anax criptus Gentilini & Peters, 1993
- Anax dubius Lacroix, 1921 (doubtful species)
- Anax ephippiger (Burmeister, 1839)
- Anax fumosus Hagen, 1867
- Anax georgius Selys, 1872
- Anax gibbosulus Rambur, 1842
- Anax gladiator Dijkstra & Kipping, 2015
- Anax guttatus (Burmeister, 1839)
- Anax immaculifrons Rambur, 1842
- Anax imperator Leach in Brewster, 1815
- Anax indicus Lieftinck, 1942
- Anax julius Brauer, 1865
- Anax junius (Drury, 1773)
- Anax longipes Hagen, 1861
- Anax maclachlani Förster, 1898
- Anax mandrakae Gauthier, 1988
- Anax nigrofasciatus Oguma, 1915
- Anax panybeus Hagen, 1867
- Anax papuensis (Burmeister, 1839)
- Anax parthenope (Selys, 1839)
- Anax piraticus Kennedy, 1934
- Anax pugnax Lieftinck, 1942
- Anax rutherfordi McLachlan, 1883
- Anax selysi Förster, 1900
- Anax speratus Hagen, 1867
- Anax strenuus Hagen, 1867
- Anax tristis Hagen, 1867
- Anax tumorifer McLachlan, 1885
- Anax walsinghami McLachlan, 1883

Andaeschna De Marmels, 1994

- Andaeschna andresi (Rácenis, 1958)
- Andaeschna occidentalis Bota-Sierra, 2019
- Andaeschna rufipes (Ris, 1918)
- Andaeschna timotocuica De Marmels, 1994
- Andaeschna unicolor (Martin, 1908)

†Anglogomphaeschna Nel & Fleck, 2014

- Anglogomphaeschna eocenica Nel & Fleck, 2014

†Anomalaeschna Bechly et al., 2001

- †Anomalaeschna berndschusteri Bechly et al., 2001

Antipodophlebia Fraser, 1960

- Antipodophlebia asthenes (Tillyard, 1916)

†Antiquiala Archibald & Cannings, 2019

- †Antiquiala snyderae Archibald & Cannings, 2019

Austroaeschna Selys, 1883

- Austroaeschna anacantha Tillyard, 1908
- Austroaeschna atrata Martin, 1909
- Austroaeschna christine Theischinger, 1993
- Austroaeschna cooloola Theischinger, 1991
- Austroaeschna eungella Theischinger, 1993
- Austroaeschna flavomaculata Tillyard, 1916
- Austroaeschna hardyi Tillyard, 1917
- Austroaeschna inermis Martin, 1901
- Austroaeschna ingrid Theischinger, 2008
- Austroaeschna muelleri Theischinger, 1982
- Austroaeschna multipunctata (Martin, 1901)
- Austroaeschna obscura Theischinger, 1982
- Austroaeschna parvistigma Martin, 1901
- Austroaeschna pinheyi Theischinger, 2001
- Austroaeschna pulchra Tillyard in Martin, 1909
- Austroaeschna sigma Theischinger, 1982
- Austroaeschna speciosa Sjöstedt, 1917
- Austroaeschna subapicalis Theischinger, 1982
- Austroaeschna tasmanica Tillyard, 1916
- Austroaeschna unicornis (Martin, 1901)

== B-F ==
†Baissaeshna Pritykina, 1977

- †Baissaeshna prisca Pritykina, 1977
- †Baissaeshna zherikhini Bechly et al., 2001

Basiaeschna Selys, 1883

- †Basiaeschna alaskaensis Garrouste & Nel
- Basiaeschna janata (Say, 1840)

Boyeria McLachlan, 1896

- Boyeria cretensis Peters, 1991
- †Boyeria europaea Nel et al., 1996
- Boyeria grafiana Williamson, 1907
- Boyeria irene (Fonscolombe, 1838)
- Boyeria karubei Yokoi, 2002
- Boyeria maclachlani (Selys, 1883)
- Boyeria sinensis Asahina, 1978
- Boyeria vinosa (Say, 1840)

Brachytron Evans, 1845

- Brachytron anisopterum (Selys, 1883)
- Brachytron longistigma (Selys, 1883)
- Brachytron pratense (Müller, 1764)

Caliaeschna Selys, 1883

- Caliaeschna microstigma (Schneider, 1845)

Castoraeschna Calvert, 1952

- Castoraeschna caster (Brauer, 1865)
- Castoraeschna colorata (Martin, 1908)
- Castoraeschna corbeti Carvalho, Pinto & Ferreira, 2009
- Castoraeschna coronata (Ris, 1918)
- Castoraeschna decurvata Dunkle & Cook, 1984
- Castoraeschna januaria (Hagen, 1867)
- Castoraeschna longfieldae (Kimmins, 1929)
- Castoraeschna margarethae Jurzitza, 1979
- Castoraeschna tepuica De Marmels, 1989

Cephalaeschna Selys, 1883

- Cephalaeschna acanthifrons Joshi & Kunte, 2017
- Cephalaeschna acutifrons (Martin, 1909)
- Cephalaeschna aipishishi Karube & Kompier, 2017
- Cephalaeschna algorei Karube & Kompier, 2017
- Cephalaeschna aritai Karube, 2003
- Cephalaeschna asahinai Karube, 2011
- Cephalaeschna biguttata Fraser, 1935
- Cephalaeschna chaoi Asahina, 1982
- Cephalaeschna cornifrons Zhang & Cai, 2013
- Cephalaeschna dinghuensis Wilson, 1999
- Cephalaeschna discolor Zhang, Cai & Liao, 2013
- Cephalaeschna klapperichi Schmidt, 1961
- Cephalaeschna klotsae Asahina, 1982
- Cephalaeschna masoni (Martin, 1909)
- Cephalaeschna mattii Zhang, Cai & Liao, 2013
- Cephalaeschna needhami Asahina, 1981
- Cephalaeschna obversa Needham, 1930
- Cephalaeschna orbifrons Selys, 1883
- Cephalaeschna ordopapiliones Zhang & Cai, 2013
- Cephalaeschna patrai Dawn, 2021
- Cephalaeschna patrorum Needham, 1930
- Cephalaeschna risi Asahina, 1981
- Cephalaeschna shaowuensis Xu, 2006
- Cephalaeschna solitaria Zhang, Cai & Liao, 2013
- Cephalaeschna triadica Lieftinck, 1977
- Cephalaeschna viridifrons (Fraser, 1922)
- Cephalaeschna xixiangensis Zhang, 2013
- Cephalaeschna yanagisawai Sasamoto & Vu, 2018
- Cephalaeschna yashiroi Sasamoto & Vu, 2021
- Cephalaeschna zhuae Yang, 2019

Coryphaeschna Williamson, 1903

- Coryphaeschna adnexa (Hagen, 1861)
- Coryphaeschna amazonica De Marmels, 1989
- Coryphaeschna apeora Paulson, 1994
- Coryphaeschna diapyra Paulson, 1994
- Coryphaeschna huaorania Tennessen, 2001
- Coryphaeschna ingens (Rambur, 1842)
- Coryphaeschna perrensi (McLachlan, 1887)
- Coryphaeschna viriditas Calvert, 1952

†Cretagomphaeschnaoides Zheng et al., 2016

- †Cretagomphaeschnaoides jarzembowskae Zheng et al., 2016

†Cretalloaeschna Jarzembowski & Nel, 1996

- †Cretalloaeschna cliffordae Jarzembowski & Nel, 1996

Dendroaeschna Tillyard, 1916

- Dendroaeschna conspersa (Tillyard, 1907)

Dromaeschna Förster, 1908

- Dromaeschna forcipata (Tillyard, 1907)
- Dromaeschna weiskei Förster, 1908

†Elektrogomphaeschna Pinkert et al., 2017

- †Elektrogomphaeschna annekeae Pinkert et al., 2017
- †Elektrogomphaeschna peterthieli Pinkert et al., 2017

†Eoshna Archibald & Cannings, 2019

- †Eoshna thompsonensis Archibald & Cannings

Epiaeschna Hagen in Selys, 1883

- †Epiaeschna gossi (Campion 1916)
- Epiaeschna heros (Fabricius, 1798)
- †Epiaeschna lucida Zhang, 1989
- †Epiaeschna magnifica Martynov, 1929
- †Epiaeschna matutina Zhang, 1989
- †Epiaeschna pseudoheros Nel & Petrulevičius, 2010
- †Epiaeschna stauropolitana Martynov, 1927
- †Epiaeschna wisseri Nel et al., 2020

†Falsisophoaeschna Zhang et al., 2008

- †Falsisophoaeschna generalis Zhang et al., 2008

== G-L ==
Gomphaeschna Selys, 1871

- Gomphaeschna antilope (Hagen, 1874)
- †Gomphaeschna carinthiae Schädel & Lechner, 2017
- Gomphaeschna furcillata (Say, 1840)
- †Gomphaeschna inferna Pritykina, 1977
- †Gomphaeschna miocenica Prokop & Nel, 2002
- †Gomphaeschna schrankii Lewis, 1988
- †Gomphaeschna sibirica Bechly et al., 2001

†Gomphaeschnaoides Carle & Wighton, 1990

- †Gomphaeschnaoides betoreti Bechly et al., 2001
- †Gomphaeschnaoides magnus Bechly et al., 2001
- †Gomphaeschnaoides obliquus Wighton, 1987
- †Gomphaeschnaoides petersi Bechly et al., 2001

Gynacantha Rambur, 1842

- Gynacantha adela Martin, 1909
- Gynacantha albistyla Fraser, 1927
- Gynacantha alcathoe Lieftinck, 1961
- Gynacantha amphora Marinov & Theischinger, 2012
- Gynacantha anandmati Sawant & Kambli, 2023
- Gynacantha andamanae Yeh & Veenakumari, 2000
- Gynacantha apiaensis Fraser, 1927
- Gynacantha apicalis Fraser, 1924
- Gynacantha arnaudi Asahina, 1984
- Gynacantha arsinoe Lieftinck, 1948
- Gynacantha arthuri Lieftinck, 1953
- Gynacantha auricularis Martin, 1909
- Gynacantha bainbriggei Fraser, 1922
- Gynacantha bartai Paulson & von Ellenrieder, 2005
- Gynacantha basiguttata Selys, 1882
- Gynacantha bayadera Selys, 1891
- Gynacantha bifida Rambur, 1842
- Gynacantha biharica Fraser, 1927
- Gynacantha bispina Rambur, 1842
- Gynacantha bullata Karsch, 1891
- Gynacantha burmana Lieftinck, 1960
- Gynacantha calliope Lieftinck, 1953
- Gynacantha calypso Ris, 1915
- Gynacantha cattienensis Kompier & Holden, 2017
- Gynacantha caudata Karsch, 1891
- Gynacantha chaplini Khan, 2021
- Gynacantha chelifera McLachlan, 1895
- Gynacantha comorensis Couteyen & Papazian, 2009
- Gynacantha congolica Dijkstra, 2015
- Gynacantha constricta Hämäläinen, 1991
- Gynacantha convergens Förster, 1908
- Gynacantha corbeti Lempert, 1999
- Gynacantha croceipennis Martin, 1897
- Gynacantha cylindrata Karsch, 1891
- Gynacantha demeter Ris, 1911 (doubtful species)
- Gynacantha dobsoni Fraser, 1951
- Gynacantha dohrni Krüger, 1899
- Gynacantha dravida Lieftinck, 1960
- Gynacantha dryadula Neiss & De Marmels, 2017
- Gynacantha ereagris Gundlach, 1888
- Gynacantha francesca (Martin, 1909)
- Gynacantha furcata Rambur, 1842
- Gynacantha gracilis (Burmeister, 1839)
- Gynacantha helenga Williamson & Williamson, 1930
- Gynacantha heros Theischinger & Richards, 2012
- Gynacantha hova Fraser, 1956
- Gynacantha immaculifrons Fraser, 1956
- Gynacantha incisura Fraser, 1935
- Gynacantha interioris Williamson, 1923
- Gynacantha japonica Bartenev, 1910
- Gynacantha jessei Williamson, 1923
- Gynacantha khasiaca McLachlan, 1896
- Gynacantha kirbyi Krüger, 1898
- Gynacantha klagesi Williamson, 1923
- Gynacantha koroana Theischinger & Marinov, 2020
- Gynacantha laticeps Williamson, 1923
- Gynacantha limbalis Karsch, 1892
- Gynacantha litoralis Williamson, 1923
- Gynacantha maclachlani Krüger, 1899
- Gynacantha malgassica Fraser, 1962
- Gynacantha manderica Grünberg, 1902
- Gynacantha membranalis Karsch, 1891
- Gynacantha mexicana Selys, 1868
- Gynacantha millardi Fraser, 1920
- Gynacantha mocsaryi Förster, 1898
- Gynacantha musa Karsch, 1892
- Gynacantha nausicaa Ris, 1915
- Gynacantha nervosa Rambur, 1842
- Gynacantha nigeriensis (Gambles, 1956)
- Gynacantha nourlangie Theischinger & Watson, 1991
- Gynacantha nuda Theischinger & Richards, 2016
- Gynacantha odoneli Fraser, 1922
- Gynacantha pallampurica Lahiri, Sandhu & Walia, 2007
- Gynacantha pasiphae Lieftinck, 1948
- Gynacantha penelope Ris, 1915
- Gynacantha phaeomeria Lieftinck, 1960
- Gynacantha pupillata Dijkstra, 2015
- Gynacantha radama Fraser, 1956
- Gynacantha rammohani Mitra & Lahiri, 1975
- Gynacantha remartinia Navás, 1934
- Gynacantha risi Laidlaw, 1931
- Gynacantha rolandmuelleri Hämäläinen, 1991
- Gynacantha rosenbergi Brauer, 1867
- Gynacantha rotundata Navás, 1930
- Gynacantha ryukyuensis Asahina, 1962
- Gynacantha saltatrix Martin, 1909
- Gynacantha sextans McLachlan, 1896
- Gynacantha stenoptera Lieftinck, 1934
- Gynacantha stevensoni Fraser, 1927
- Gynacantha stylata Martin, 1896
- Gynacantha subinterrupta Rambur, 1842
- Gynacantha tenuis Martin, 1909
- Gynacantha tibiata Karsch, 1891
- Gynacantha usambarica Sjöstedt, 1909
- Gynacantha vanuatua Theischinger, Marinov & Bybee, 2020
- Gynacantha vargasi Haber, 2019
- Gynacantha vesiculata Karsch, 1891
- Gynacantha victoriae (Pinhey, 1961)
- Gynacantha villosa Grünberg, 1902
- Gynacantha vitiana Theischinger & Marinov, 2020

Gynacanthaeschna Fraser, 1921

- Gynacanthaeschna sikkima (Karsch, 1891)

Heliaeschna Selys, 1882

- Heliaeschna bartelsi Lieftinck, 1940
- Heliaeschna crassa Krüger, 1899
- Heliaeschna cynthiae Fraser, 1939
- Heliaeschna filostyla Martin, 1906
- Heliaeschna fuliginosa Karsch, 1893
- Heliaeschna idae (Brauer, 1865)
- Heliaeschna sembe Pinhey, 1962
- Heliaeschna simplicia (Karsch, 1891)
- Heliaeschna trinervulata Fraser, 1955
- Heliaeschna ugandica McLachlan, 1896
- Heliaeschna uniervula Martin, 1909

†Huncoaeshna Petrulevičius et al., 2010

- †Huncoaeshna corrugata Petrulevičius et al., 2010

†Idemlinea Archibald & Cannings, 2019

- †Idemlinea versatilis Archibald & Cannings, 2019

Indaeschna Fraser, 1926

- Indaeschna baluga Needham & Gyger, 1937
- Indaeschna erythromelas (McLachlan, 1896)
- Indaeschna grubaueri (Förster, 1904)
- Indaeschna melanictera (Selys, 1883)
- Indaeschna ornithocephala (McLachlan, 1896)

Isoaeschna Schneider et al., 2023

- Isoaeschna isoceles (Müller, 1767)

†Kachinaeshna Zheng et al., 2019

- †Kachinaeshna zhuoi Zheng et al., 2019

†Kishenehna Archibald & Cannings, 2022

- †Kishenehna prima Archibald & Cannings, 2022

Limnetron Förster, 1907

- Limnetron antarcticum Förster, 1907
- Limnetron debile (Karsch, 1891)

Linaeschna Martin, 1908

- Linaeschna polli Martin, 1909

== M-P ==
Nasiaeschna Selys in Förster, 1900

- Nasiaeschna pentacantha (Rambur, 1842)

Neuraeschna Hagen, 1867

- Neuraeschna calverti Kimmins, 1951
- Neuraeschna capillata Machet, 1990
- Neuraeschna claviforcipata Martin, 1909
- Neuraeschna clavulata Machet, 1990
- Neuraeschna cornuta Belle, 1989
- Neuraeschna costalis (Burmeister, 1839)
- Neuraeschna dentigera Martin, 1909
- Neuraeschna harpya Martin, 1909
- Neuraeschna maxima Belle, 1989
- Neuraeschna maya Belle, 1989
- Neuraeschna mayoruna Belle, 1989
- Neuraeschna mina Williamson & Williamson, 1930
- Neuraeschna producta Kimmins, 1935
- Neuraeschna tapajonica Machado, 2002
- Neuraeschna titania Belle, 1989

Notoaeschna Tillyard, 1916

- Notoaeschna geminata Theischinger, 1982
- Notaeschna sagittata (Martin, 1901)

†Oligaeschna Piton & Théobald, (1939)

- †Oligaeschna ashutasica Martynov, 1929
- †Oligaeschna bulgariensis Nel et al., 2016
- †Oligaeschna jungi Piton & Théobald, 1939
- †Oligaeschna kvaceki Prokop & Nel, 2007
- †Oligaeschna lapidaria Cockerell & Counts, 1913
- †Oligaeschna palaeocoerulea Timon-David, 1946
- †Oligaeschna saurai Peñalver et al., 1996
- †Oligaeschna separata Scudder, 1890
- †Oligaeschna sinica Huang et al., 2022
- †Oligaeschna wedmanni Nel & Fleck, 2014

Oligoaeschna Selys, 1889

- Oligoaeschna amata (Förster, 1903)
- Oligoaeschna andamani Chhotani, Lahiri & Mitra, 1983
- †Oligoaeschna anglica Cockerell & Andrews, 1916
- Oligoaeschna aquilonaris Wilson, 2005
- Oligoaeschna buehri Förster, 1903)
- †Oligoaeschna conjuncta Martynov, 1929
- Oligoaeschna elacatura (Needham, 1907)
- Oligoaeschna foliacea Lieftinck, 1968
- Oligoaeschna modiglianii Selys, 1889
- Oligoaeschna mutata Lieftinck, 1940
- †Oligoaeschna needhami Cockerell, 1907
- †Oligoaeschna oligocenica Nel & Papazian, 1983
- Oligoaeschna petalura Lieftinck, 1968
- Oligoaeschna platyura Lieftinck, 1940
- Oligoaeschna poeciloptera (Karsch, 1889)
- †Oligoaeschna pryeri Martin, 1909
- Oligoaeschna pseudosumatrana Karube, 1997
- Oligoaeschna sirindhornae Ngiam & Orr, 2017
- Oligoaeschna sumatrana Lieftinck, 1953
- Oligoaeschna uemurai Asahina, 1990
- Oligoaeschna uropetala Lieftinck, 1968
- Oligoaeschna venatrix (Förster, 1903)
- Oligoaeschna venusta Lieftinck, 1968
- Oligoaeschna zambo Needham & Gyger, 1937

Oplonaeschna Selys, 1883

- Oplonaeschna armata (Hagen, 1861)
- Oplonaeschna magna González-Soriano & Novelo-Gutiérrez, 1998
- †Oplonaeschna metis Heer, 1849
- †Oplonaeschna staurophlebioides Henriksen, 1922
- †Oplonaeschna vectensis Cockerell & Andrews, 1916 (dubious species)

Oreaeschna Lieftinck, 1937

- Oreaeschna dictatrix Lieftinck, 1937
- Oreaeschna dominatrix Vick & Davies, 1990

†Palaeaeschna Meunier 1914

- †Palaeaeschna vidali Meunier 1914

†Parabaissaeshna Bechly & Rasmussen, 2019

- †Parabaissaeshna ejerslevense Bechly & Rasmussen, 2019

†Paramorbaeschna Bechly et al., 2001

- †Paramorbaeschna araripensis Bechly et al., 2001

Periaeschna Martin, 1909

- Periaeschna flinti Asahina, 1978
- Periaeschna furukawai Karube & Kompier, 2018
- Periaeschna gerrhon (Wilson, 2005)
- Periaeschna laidlawi (Förster, 1908)
- Periaeschna magdalena Martin, 1909
- Periaeschna mira Navás, 1936
- Periaeschna nocturnalis Fraser, 1927
- Periaeschna sanoi Karube & Kompier, 2018
- Periaeschna unifasciata Fraser, 1935
- Periaeschna yashiroi Sasamoto & Vu, 2020
- Periaeschna yazhenae Xu, 2012
- Periaeschna zhangzhouensis Xu, 2007
- Petaliaeschna corneliae Asahina, 1982
- Petaliaeschna flavipes Karube, 1999
- Petaliaeschna fletcheri Fraser, 1927
- Petaliaeschna lieftincki Asahina, 1982
- Petaliaeschna pinratanai Karube, 2000

Pinheyschna Peters & Theischinger, 2011

- Pinheyschna meruensis (Sjöstedt, 1909)
- Pinheyschna moori (Pinhey, 1981)
- Pinheyschna rileyi (Calvert, 1892)
- Pinheyschna subpupillata (McLachlan, 1896)
- Pinheyschna waterstoni Peters & Theischinger, 2011
- Pinheyschna yemenensis (Waterston, 1985)

Plattycantha Förster, 1908

- Plattycantha acuta Lieftinck, 1937
- Plattycantha cornuta (Förster, 1900)
- Plattycantha venatrix Lieftinck, 1937

†Plesigomphaeschnaoides Bechly et al., 2001

- †Plesigomphaeschnaoides danica (Madsen & Nel 1997)
- †Plesigomphaeschnaoides mongolensis Bechly et al., 2001
- †Plesigomphaeschnaoides paleocenica (Madsen & Nel, 1997)
- †Plesigomphaeschnaoides pindelskii Bechly et al. 2001

†Progomphaeschnaoides Bechly et al., 2001

- †Progomphaeschnaoides staniczeki Bechly et al. 2001
- †Progomphaeschnaoides ursulae Bechly et al. 2001

== Q-Z ==
Racenaeschna Calvert, 1958

- Racenaeschna angustistrigis Calvert, 1958

Remartinia Navás, 1911

- Remartinia luteipennis (Burmeister, 1839)
- Remartinia restricta Carvalho, 1992
- Remartinia rufipennis (Kennedy, 1941)
- Remartinia secreta (Calvert, 1952)

Rhionaeschna Förster, 1909

- Rhionaeschna absoluta (Calvert, 1952)
- Rhionaeschna biliosa (Kennedy, 1938)
- Rhionaeschna bonariensis (Rambur, 1842)
- Rhionaeschna brasiliensis (von Ellenrieder & Martins Costa, 2002)
- Rhionaeschna brevicercia (Muzón & von Ellenrieder, 2001)
- Rhionaeschna brevifrons (Hagen, 1861)
- Rhionaeschna californica (Calvert, 1895)
- Rhionaeschna caligo Bota-Sierra, 2014
- Rhionaeschna condor (De Marmels, 2001)
- Rhionaeschna confusa (Rambur, 1842)
- Rhionaeschna cornigra (Brauer, 1865)
- Rhionaeschna decessus (Calvert, 1953)
- Rhionaeschna demarmelsi von Ellenrieder, 2003
- Rhionaeschna diffinis (Rambur, 1842)
- Rhionaeschna draco (Rácenis, 1958)
- Rhionaeschna dugesi (Calvert, 1905)
- Rhionaeschna eduardoi (Machado, 1984)
- Rhionaeschna elsia (Calvert, 1952)
- Rhionaeschna fissifrons (Muzón & von Ellenrieder, 2001)
- Rhionaeschna galapagoensis (Currie, 1901)
- Rhionaeschna haarupi (Ris, 1908)
- Rhionaeschna intricata (Martin, 1908)
- Rhionaeschna itataia (Carvalho & Salgado, 2004)
- Rhionaeschna jalapensis (Williamson, 1908)
- Rhionaeschna joannisi (Martin, 1897)
- Rhionaeschna manni (Williamson & Williamson, 1930)
- Rhionaeschna marchali (Rambur, 1842)
- Rhionaeschna multicolor (Hagen, 1861)
- Rhionaeschna mutata (Hagen, 1861)
- Rhionaeschna nubigena (De Marmels, 1989)
- Rhionaeschna obscura (Muzón & von Ellenrieder, 2001)
- Rhionaeschna pallipes (Fraser, 1947)
- Rhionaeschna pauloi (Machado, 1994)
- Rhionaeschna peralta (Ris, 1918)
- Rhionaeschna planaltica (Calvert, 1952)
- Rhionaeschna psilus (Calvert, 1947)
- Rhionaeschna punctata (Martin, 1908)
- Rhionaeschna serrania (Carvalho & Salgado, 2004)
- Rhionaeschna tinti (von Ellenrieder, 2000)
- Rhionaeschna variegata (Fabricius, 1775)
- Rhionaeschna vazquezae (González-Soriano, 1986)
- Rhionaeschna vigintipunctata (Ris, 1918)

Sarasaeschna Karube & Yeh, 2001

- Sarasaeschna chiangchinlii Chen & Yeh, 2014
- Sarasaeschna decorata (Lieftinck, 1968)
- Sarasaeschna gaofengensis Yeh & Kiyoshi, 2015
- Sarasaeschna kaoi Yeh, Lee & Wong, 2015
- Sarasaeschna khasiana (Lieftinck, 1968)
- Sarasaeschna kunigamiensis (Ishida, 1972)
- Sarasaeschna lieni (Yeh & Chen, 2000)
- Sarasaeschna martini (Laidlaw, 1921)
- Sarasaeschna minuta (Asahina, 1986)
- Sarasaeschna niisatoi (Karube, 1998)
- Sarasaeschna pramoti (Yeh, 2000)
- Sarasaeschna pryeri (Martin, 1909)
- Sarasaeschna pyanan (Asahina, 1951)
- Sarasaeschna sabre (Wilson & Reels, 2001)
- Sarasaeschna speciosa (Karube, 1998)
- Sarasaeschna tsaopiensis (Yeh & Chen, 2000)
- Sarasaeschna yoshitomii Kiyoshi et al., 2016
- Sarasaeschna zhuae Xu, 2008

†Sinojagoria Bechly et al., 2001

- †Sinojagoria cancellosa Li et al., 2012
- †Sinojagoria imperfecta Bechly et al., 2001
- †Sinojagoria magna Li et al., 2012

†Sophoaeschna Zhang et al., 2008

- †Sophoaeschna frigida Zhang et al., 2008

Spinaeschna Theischinger, 1982

- Spinaeschna tripunctata (Martin, 1901)
- Spinaeschna watsoni Theischinger, 1982

Staurophlebia Brauer, 1865

- Staurophlebia auca Kennedy, 1937
- Staurophlebia bosqui Navás, 1927
- Staurophlebia gigantula Martin, 1909
- Staurophlebia reticulata (Burmeister, 1839)
- Staurophlebia wayana Geijskes, 1959

Sundaeschna Kiyoshi & Katatani, 2018

- Sundaeschna cattienensis Katatani & Kiyoshi, 2018
- Sundaeschna tanintharyiensis Kiyoshi & Katatani, 2018

Telephlebia Selys, 1883

- Telephlebia brevicauda Tillyard, 1916
- Telephlebia cyclops Tillyard, 1916
- Telephlebia godeffroyi Selys, 1883
- Telephlebia tillyardi Campion in Tillyard, 1916
- Telephlebia tryoni Tillyard, 1917
- Telephlebia undia Theischinger, 1985

Tetracanthagyna Selys, 1883

- Tetracanthagyna bakeri Campion in Laidlaw, 1928
- Tetracanthagyna brunnea McLachlan, 1898
- Tetracanthagyna degorsi Martin, 1895
- Tetracanthagyna plagiata (Waterhouse, 1877)
- Tetracanthagyna waterhousei McLachlan, 1898

Triacanthagyna Selys, 1883

- Triacanthagyna caribbea Williamson, 1923
- Triacanthagyna dentata (Geijskes, 1943
- Triacanthagyna ditzleri Williamson, 1923
- Triacanthagyna nympha (Navás, 1933)
- Triacanthagyna obscuripennis (Blanchard in d’Orbigny, 1843)
- Triacanthagyna satyrus (Martin, 1909)
- Triacanthagyna septima (Selys in Sagra, 1857)
- Triacanthagyna trifida (Rambur, 1842)
- Triacanthagyna williamsoni von Ellenrieder & Garrison, 2003

†Ypshna Archibald & Cannings, 2019

- †Ypshna brownleei Archibald & Cannings, 2019
- †Ypshna latipennata Archibald & Cannings, 2019

Zosteraeschna Peters & Theischinger, 2011

- Zosteraeschna ellioti (Kirby, 1896)
- Zosteraeschna minuscula (McLachlan, 1896)
- Zosteraeschna usambarica (Förster, 1906)
