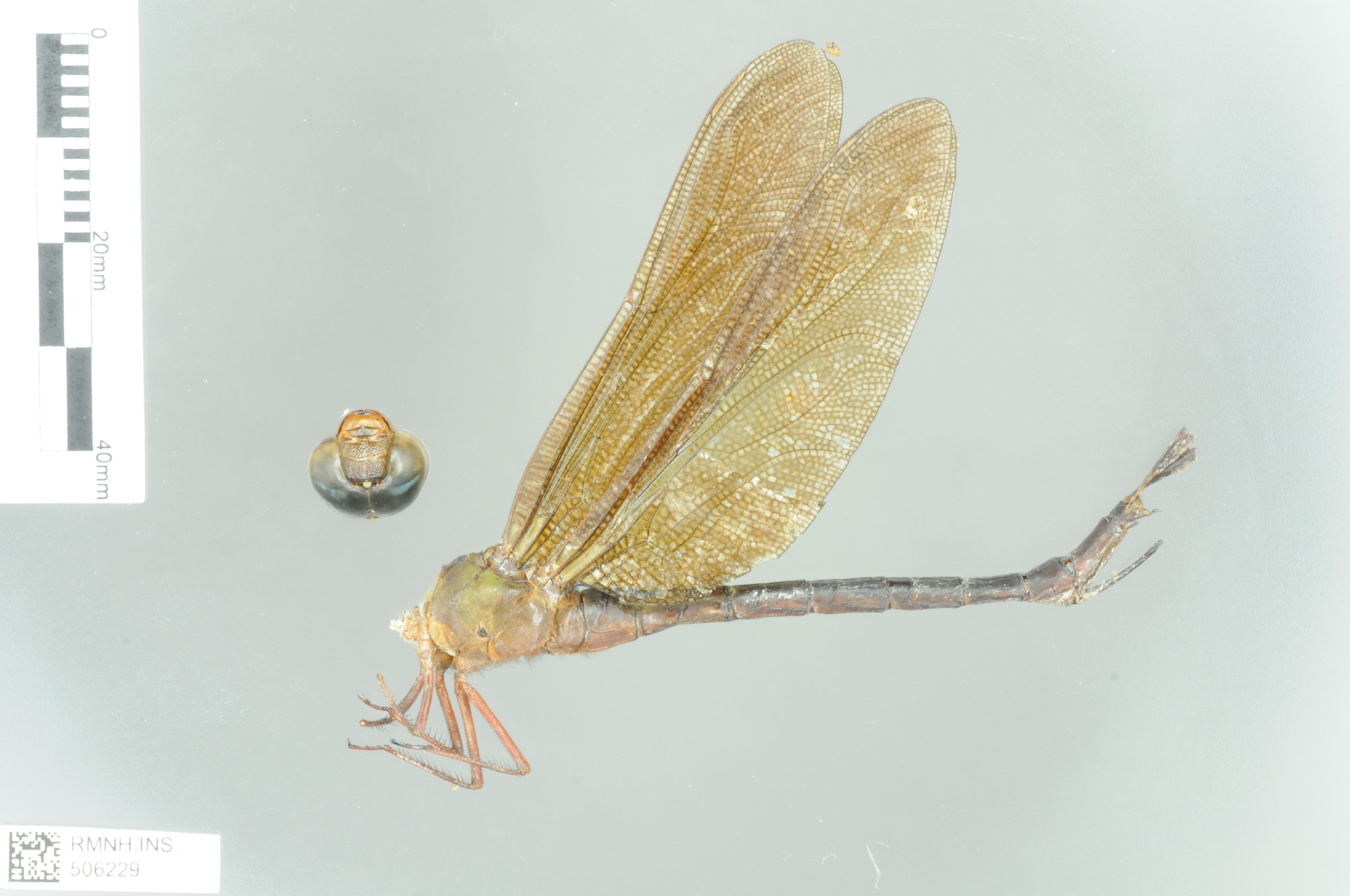

Conservation status
- Least Concern (IUCN 3.1)

Scientific classification
- Kingdom: Animalia
- Phylum: Arthropoda
- Class: Insecta
- Order: Odonata
- Infraorder: Anisoptera
- Family: Aeshnidae
- Genus: Gynacantha
- Species: G. africana

Binomial name
- Gynacantha africana (Palisot de Beauvois, 1807)

= Gynacantha africana =

Species of dragonfly

Gynacantha africana is a species of dragonfly in the family Aeshnidae. It is found in Cameroon, Central African Republic, the Republic of the Congo, Ivory Coast, Equatorial Guinea, Gabon, Ghana, Nigeria, and Uganda. Its natural habitats are subtropical or tropical moist lowland forests and shrub-dominated wetlands.
