= Gynacantha chaplini =

Scientific classification
- Kingdom: Animalia
- Phylum: Arthropoda
- Clade: Pancrustacea
- Class: Insecta
- Order: Odonata
- Suborder: Anisoptera
- Family: Aeshnidae
- Genus: Gynacantha
- Species: G. chaplini

Binomial name
- Gynacantha chaplini Khan 2021

Species of dragonfly

Gynacantha chaplini is a species of dragonfly described from north-eastern Bangladesh.

== Etymology ==
The species is named in honor of the famous British actor and director, Charlie Chaplin (masculine noun, singular in the genitive case). The trapezium-shaped marking of the postfrons of the new species resembles Chaplin’s toothbrush moustache.
