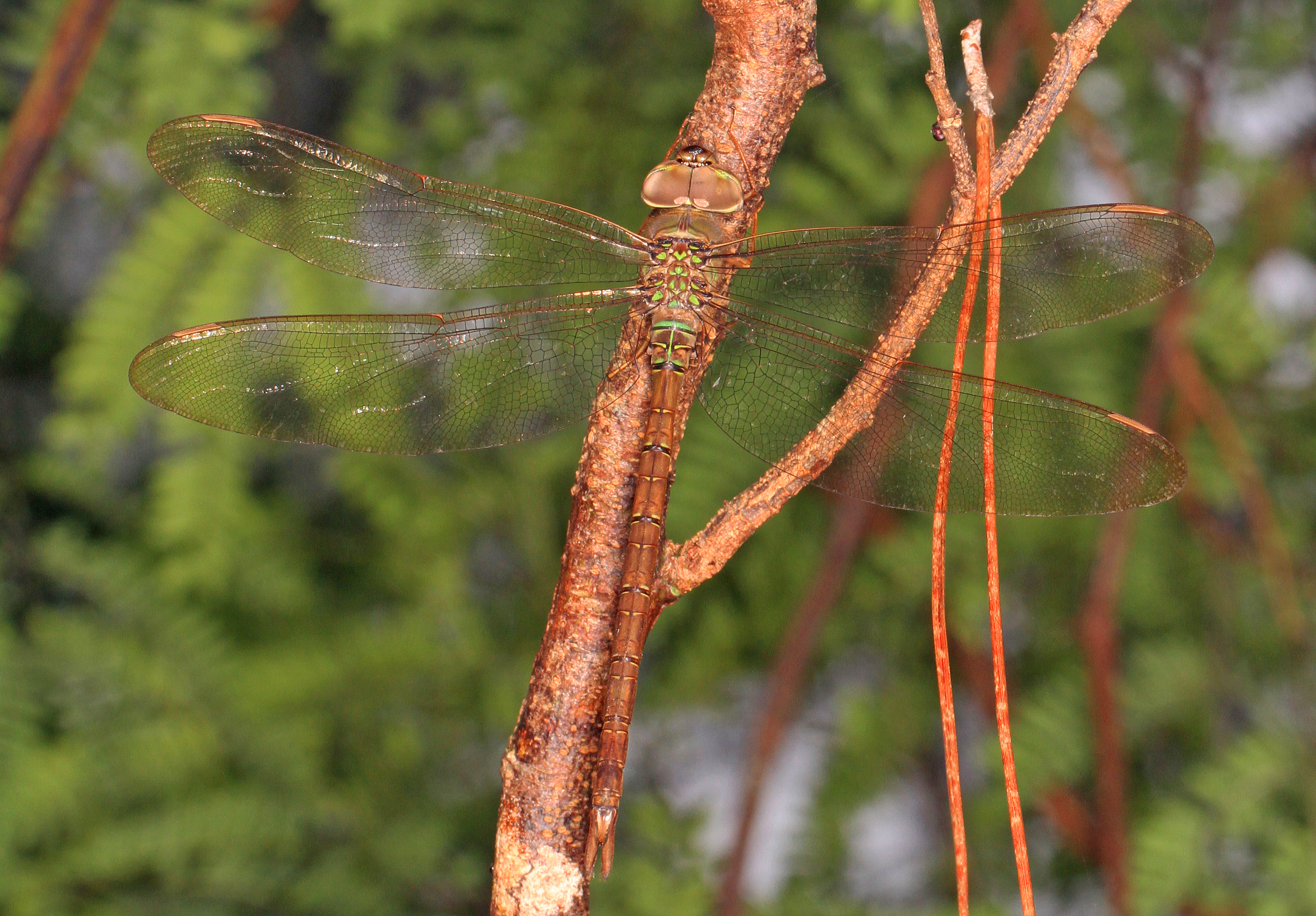

Conservation status
- Least Concern (IUCN 3.1)

Scientific classification
- Kingdom: Animalia
- Phylum: Arthropoda
- Class: Insecta
- Order: Odonata
- Infraorder: Anisoptera
- Family: Aeshnidae
- Genus: Gynacantha
- Species: G. nervosa

Binomial name
- Gynacantha nervosa Rambur, 1842

= Gynacantha nervosa =

Species of dragonfly

Gynacantha nervosa, the twilight darner, is a species of darner in the dragonfly family Aeshnidae. It is found in the Caribbean Sea, Central America, North America, and South America.

The IUCN conservation status of Gynacantha nervosa is "LC", least concern, with no immediate threat to the species' survival. The population is stable. The IUCN status was reviewed in 2017.

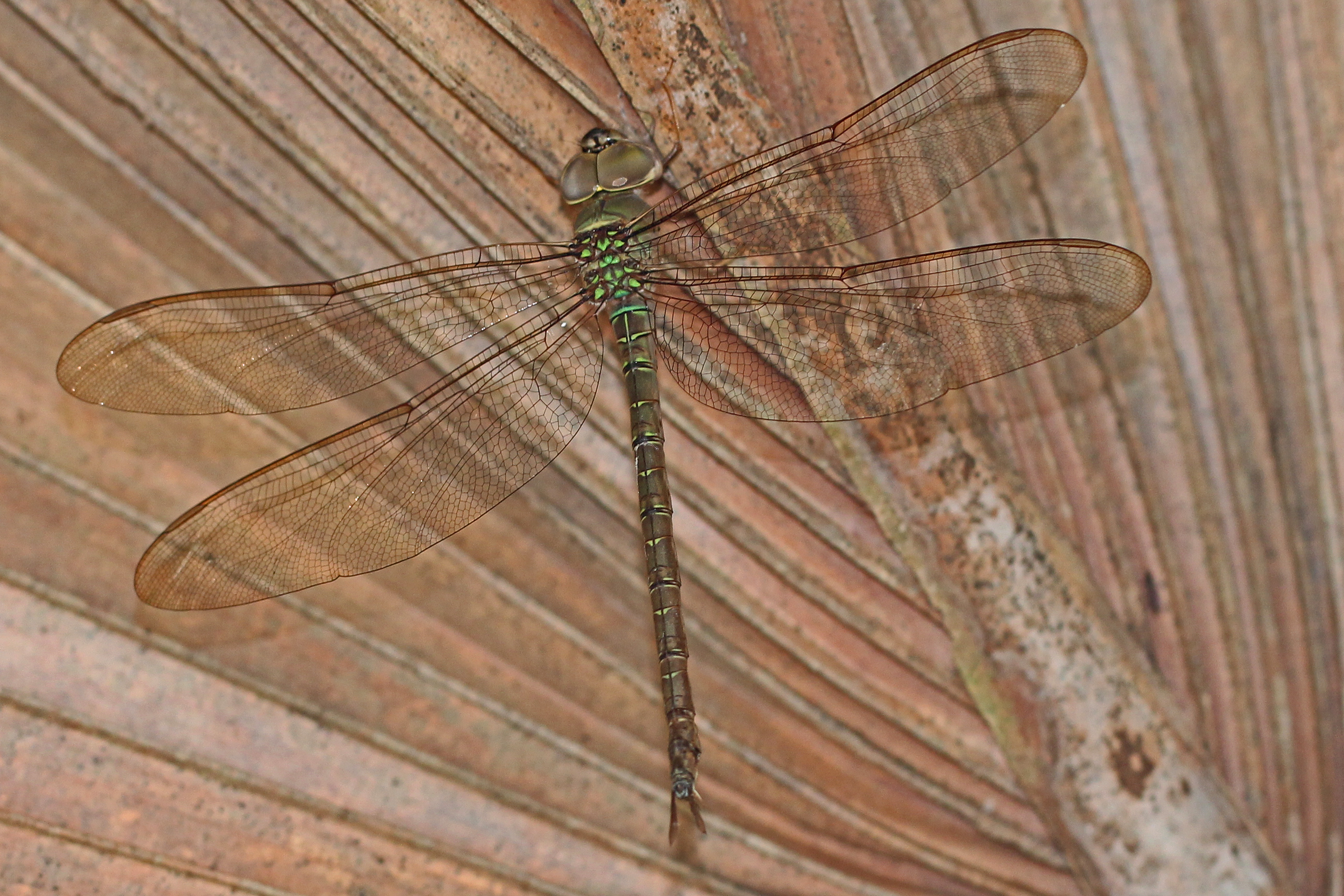
Twilight darner, Gynacantha nervosa

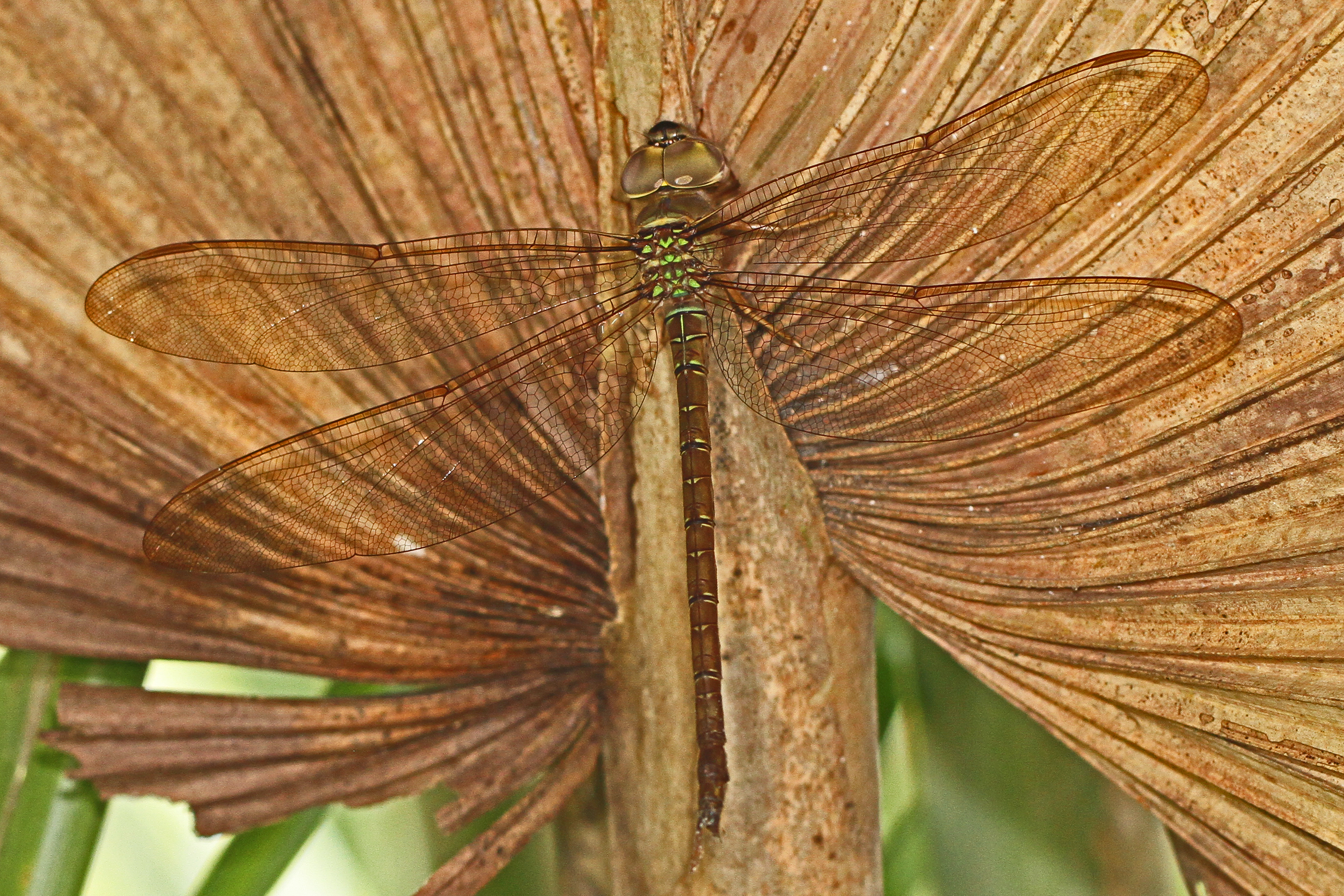
Twilight darner, Gynacantha nervosa
