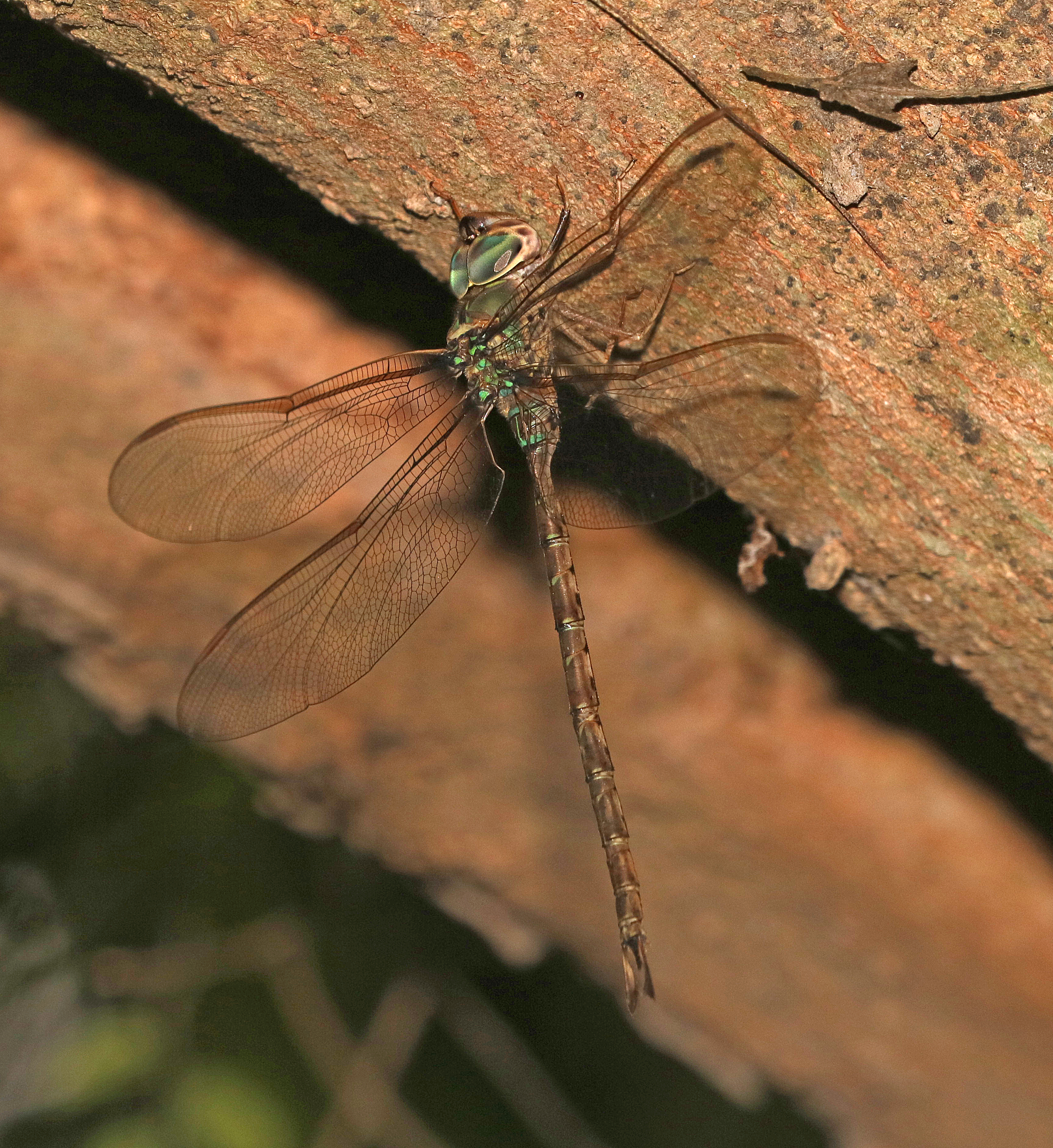

Conservation status
- Least Concern (IUCN 3.1)

Scientific classification
- Kingdom: Animalia
- Phylum: Arthropoda
- Class: Insecta
- Order: Odonata
- Infraorder: Anisoptera
- Family: Aeshnidae
- Genus: Gynacantha
- Species: G. mexicana

Binomial name
- Gynacantha mexicana Selys, 1868

= Gynacantha mexicana =

Species of dragonfly

Gynacantha mexicana, the bar-sided darner, is a species of darner in the dragonfly family Aeshnidae. It is found in Central America, North America, and South America.

The IUCN conservation status of Gynacantha mexicana is "LC", least concern, with no immediate threat to the species' survival. The population is stable. The IUCN status was reviewed in 2017.
