= Gynacantha manderica =

Conservation status
- Least Concern (IUCN 3.1)

Scientific classification
- Kingdom: Animalia
- Phylum: Arthropoda
- Class: Insecta
- Order: Odonata
- Infraorder: Anisoptera
- Family: Aeshnidae
- Genus: Gynacantha
- Species: G. manderica

Binomial name
- Gynacantha manderica Grünberg, 1902

Species of dragonfly

Gynacantha manderica is a species of dragonfly in the family Aeshnidae. It is found in Burundi, the Democratic Republic of the Congo, Ivory Coast, Ghana, Guinea, Kenya, Liberia, Malawi, Namibia, Nigeria, Sierra Leone, Somalia, South Africa, Sudan, Tanzania, Uganda, Zambia, and Zimbabwe. Its natural habitats are subtropical or tropical moist lowland forests, subtropical or tropical moist shrubland, and shrub-dominated wetlands.
