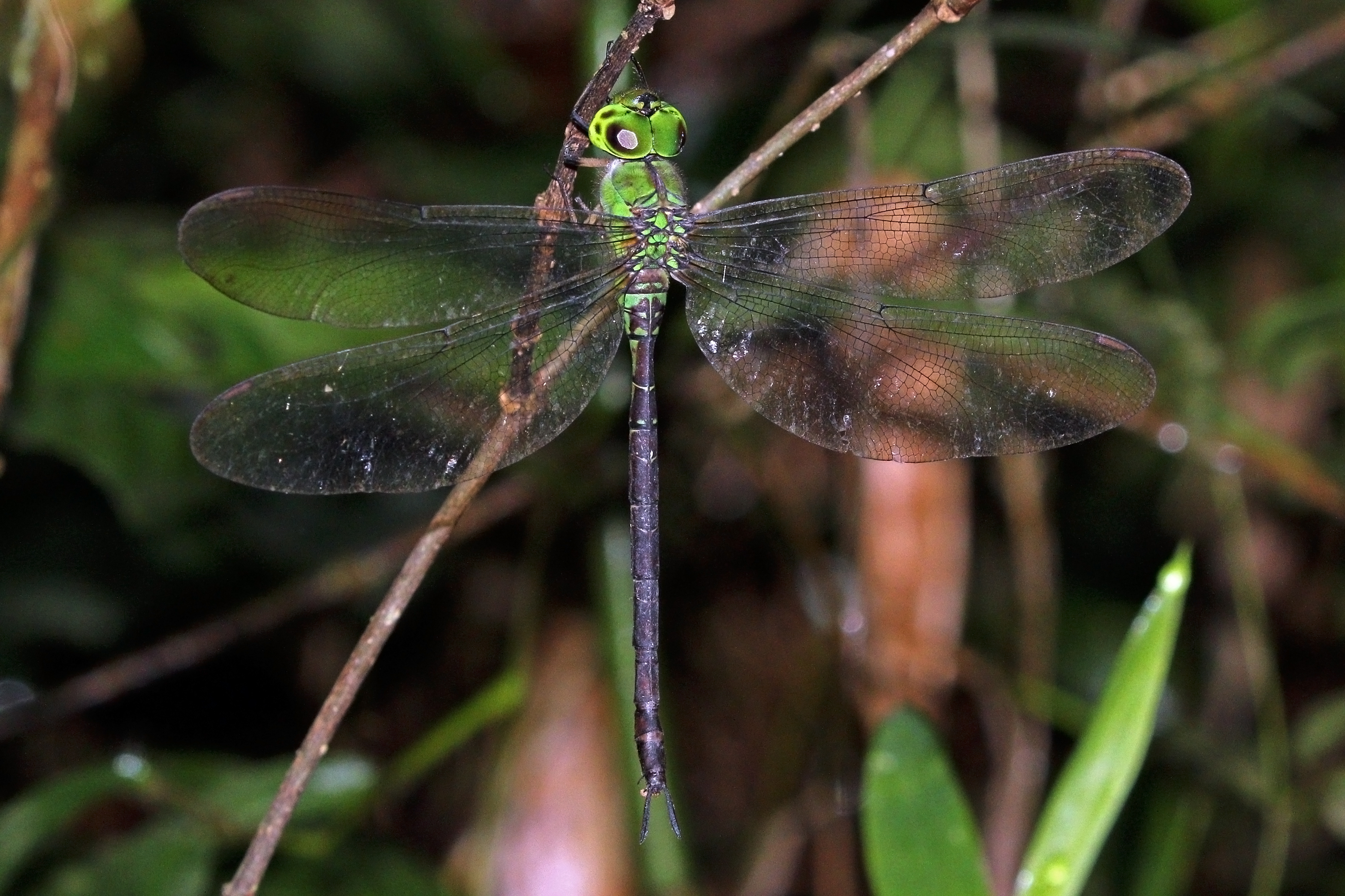
- Female, Aburi Botanical gardens, Ghana

Conservation status
- Least Concern (IUCN 3.1)

Scientific classification
- Kingdom: Animalia
- Phylum: Arthropoda
- Class: Insecta
- Order: Odonata
- Infraorder: Anisoptera
- Family: Aeshnidae
- Genus: Gynacantha
- Species: G. bullata

Binomial name
- Gynacantha bullata Karsch, 1891

= Gynacantha bullata =

Species of dragonfly

Gynacantha bullata, the black-kneed duskhawker, is a species of dragonfly in the family Aeshnidae. It is found in Burundi, Cameroon, Central African Republic, the Republic of the Congo, Ivory Coast, Equatorial Guinea, Gabon, Ghana, Guinea, Kenya, Liberia, Malawi, Nigeria, Sierra Leone, Tanzania, Togo, and Uganda. Its natural habitats are subtropical or tropical moist lowland forests and shrub-dominated wetlands. Gynacantha bullata is a very widespread species, however deforestation is a threat in parts of its range and the impacts of this needs to be monitored. At present, it is not thought that this will cause the global population to decline at a sufficient rate to qualify or nearly qualify the species for a threatened category under criterion A; therefore it is assessed as Least Concern.
