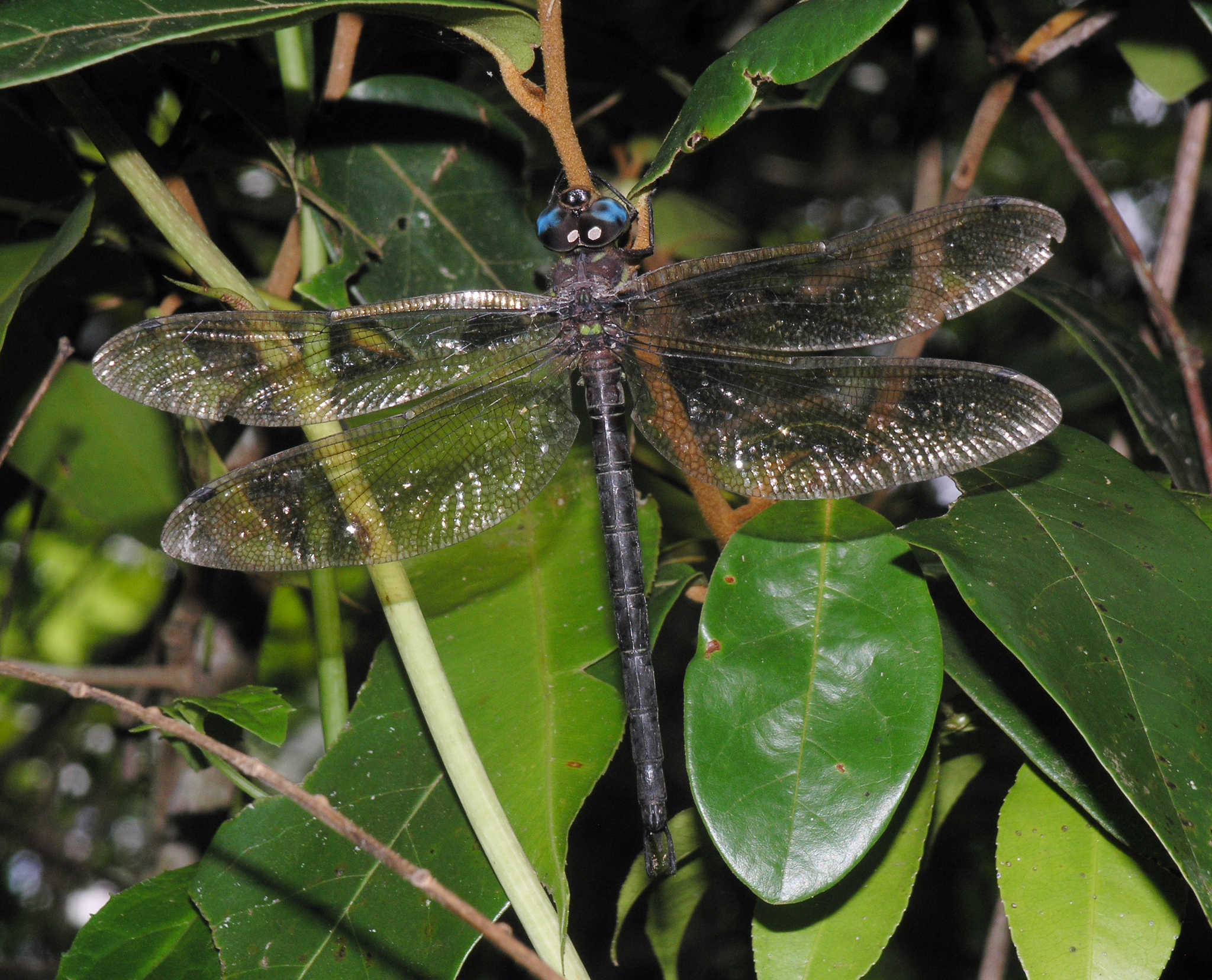
- Tetracanthagyna waterhousei

Scientific classification
- Kingdom: Animalia
- Phylum: Arthropoda
- Clade: Pancrustacea
- Class: Insecta
- Order: Odonata
- Infraorder: Anisoptera
- Family: Aeshnidae
- Subfamily: Aeshninae
- Genus: Tetracanthagyna; Selys, 1883

Type species
- Gynacantha plagiata Waterhouse, 1877

= Tetracanthagyna =

Genus of dragonflies

Tetracanthagyna is an Asian genus of dragonflies in the family Aeshnidae.

T. plagiata is the world's largest dragonfly by wingspan and the female T. plagiata is probably the heaviest living odonate.

The genus contains the following species:

- Tetracanthagyna bakeri Campion in Laidaw, 1928
- Tetracanthagyna brunnea McLachlan, 1898
- Tetracanthagyna degorsi Martin, 1895
- Tetracanthagyna plagiata (Waterhouse, 1877) – giant hawker
- Tetracanthagyna waterhousei McLachlan, 1898 – giant river hawker
