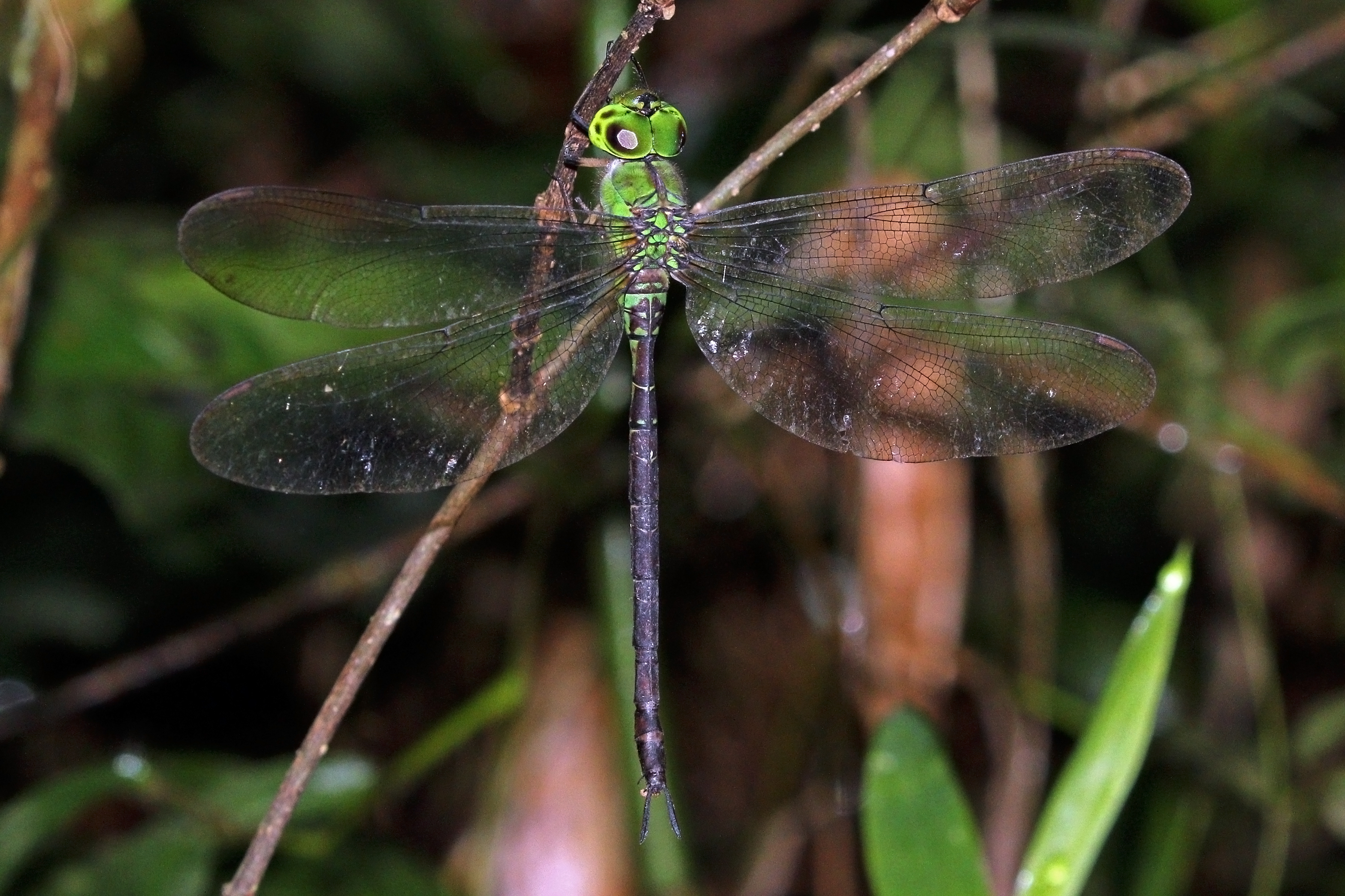
- Black-kneed duskhawker Gynacantha bullata female, Aburi Botanical Gardens, Ghana

Scientific classification
- Kingdom: Animalia
- Phylum: Arthropoda
- Clade: Pancrustacea
- Class: Insecta
- Order: Odonata
- Infraorder: Anisoptera
- Family: Aeshnidae
- Genus: Gynacantha; Rambur, 1842

= Gynacantha =

Genus of dragonflies

Gynacantha is a genus of dragonflies in the family Aeshnidae. The females have two prominent spines under the last abdominal segment. This gives the genus name (from Greek female and thorn) and the common name two-spined darners; they are also known as duskhawkers.

== Etymology ==
The genus name Gynacantha is derived from Greek γυνή (gynē, “woman”) and ἄκανθα (akantha, “thorn”). The name refers to the spines at the end of the female abdomen.

== Species ==
The genus Gynacantha includes the following species:

1. Gynacantha adela Martin, 1909
2. Gynacantha africana (Palisot de Beauvois, 1805) - Giant Duskhawker
3. Gynacantha albistyla Fraser, 1927
4. Gynacantha alcathoe Lieftinck, 1961
5. Gynacantha apiaensis Fraser, 1927
6. Gynacantha apicalis Fraser, 1924
7. Gynacantha arnaudi Asahina, 1984
8. Gynacantha arsinoe Lieftinck, 1948
9. Gynacantha arthuri Lieftinck, 1953
10. Gynacantha auricularis Martin, 1909
11. Gynacantha bainbriggei Fraser, 1922
12. Gynacantha bartai Paulson & von Ellenrieder, 2005
13. Gynacantha basiguttata Selys, 1882
14. Gynacantha bayadera Selys, 1891 (= G. furcata?)
15. Gynacantha bifida Rambur, 1842
16. Gynacantha biharica Fraser, 1927
17. Gynacantha bispina Rambur, 1842
18. Gynacantha bullata Karsch, 1891 - Black-kneed Duskhawker
19. Gynacantha burmana Lieftinck, 1960
20. Gynacantha calliope Lieftinck, 1953
21. Gynacantha calypso Ris, 1915
22. Gynacantha cattienensis Kompier & Holden, 2017
23. Gynacantha caudata Karsch, 1891
24. Gynacantha chaplini Khan, 2021
25. Gynacantha chelifera McLachlan, 1895
26. Gynacantha comorensis Couteyen & Papazian, 2009
27. Gynacantha constricta Hämäläinen, 1991
28. Gynacantha convergens Förster, 1908
29. Gynacantha corbeti Lempert, 1999
30. Gynacantha croceipennis Martin, 1897
31. Gynacantha cylindrata Karsch, 1891 - Greater girdled Duskhawker
32. Gynacantha demeter Ris, 1911
33. Gynacantha dobsoni Fraser, 1951 – lesser duskhawker
34. Gynacantha dohrni Krüger, 1899
35. Gynacantha dravida Lieftinck, 1960
36. Gynacantha ereagris Gundlach, 1888
37. Gynacantha francesca (Martin, 1909)
38. Gynacantha furcata Rambur, 1842
39. Gynacantha gracilis (Burmeister, 1839)
40. Gynacantha helenga Williamson & Williamson, 1930
41. Gynacantha hova Fraser, 1956
42. Gynacantha hyalina Selys, 1882
43. Gynacantha immaculifrons Fraser, 1956 - Pale Duskhawker
44. Gynacantha incisura Fraser, 1935
45. Gynacantha interioris Williamson, 1923
46. Gynacantha japonica Bartenev, 1909
47. Gynacantha jessei Williamson, 1923
48. Gynacantha khasiaca McLachlan, 1896
49. Gynacantha kirbyi Krüger, 1898 – slender duskhawker
50. Gynacantha klagesi Williamson, 1923
51. Gynacantha laticeps Williamson, 1923
52. Gynacantha limbalis Karsch, 1892
53. Gynacantha litoralis Williamson, 1923
54. Gynacantha maclachlani Förster, 1899
55. Gynacantha malgassica Fraser, 1962
56. Gynacantha manderica Grünberg, 1902 – little duskhawker
57. Gynacantha membranalis Karsch, 1891
58. Gynacantha mexicana Selys, 1868 – bar-sided darner
59. Gynacantha mocsaryi Förster, 1898 – paddle-tipped duskhawker
60. Gynacantha musa Karsch, 1892
61. Gynacantha nausicaa Ris, 1915
62. Gynacantha nervosa Rambur, 1842 – twilight darner
63. Gynacantha nigeriensis (Gambles, 1956) – yellow-legged duskhawker
64. Gynacantha nourlangie Theischinger & Watson, 1991 – cave duskhawker
65. Gynacantha odoneli Fraser, 1922
66. Gynacantha pasiphae Lieftinck, 1948
67. Gynacantha penelope Ris, 1915
68. Gynacantha phaeomeria Lieftinck, 1960
69. Gynacantha radama Fraser, 1956
70. Gynacantha rammohani Mitra & Lahiri, 1975
71. Gynacantha remartinia Navás, 1934
72. Gynacantha risi Laidlaw, 1931
73. Gynacantha rolandmuelleri Hämäläinen, 1991
74. Gynacantha rosenbergi Kaup in Brauer, 1867 – grey duskhawker
75. Gynacantha rotundata Navás, 1930
76. Gynacantha ryukyuensis Asahina, 1962
77. Gynacantha saltatrix Martin, 1909
78. Gynacantha sextans McLachlan, 1896 - Dark-rayed Duskhawker
79. Gynacantha stenoptera Lieftinck, 1934
80. Gynacantha stevensoni Fraser, 1927
81. Gynacantha stylata Martin, 1896
82. Gynacantha subinterrupta Rambur, 1842
83. Gynacantha tenuis Martin, 1909
84. Gynacantha tibiata Karsch, 1891
85. Gynacantha usambarica Sjöstedt, 1909 – Usambara duskhawker
86. Gynacantha vargasi Haber, 2019
87. Gynacantha vesiculata Karsch, 1891
88. Gynacantha villosa Grünberg, 1902 – hairy duskhawker
