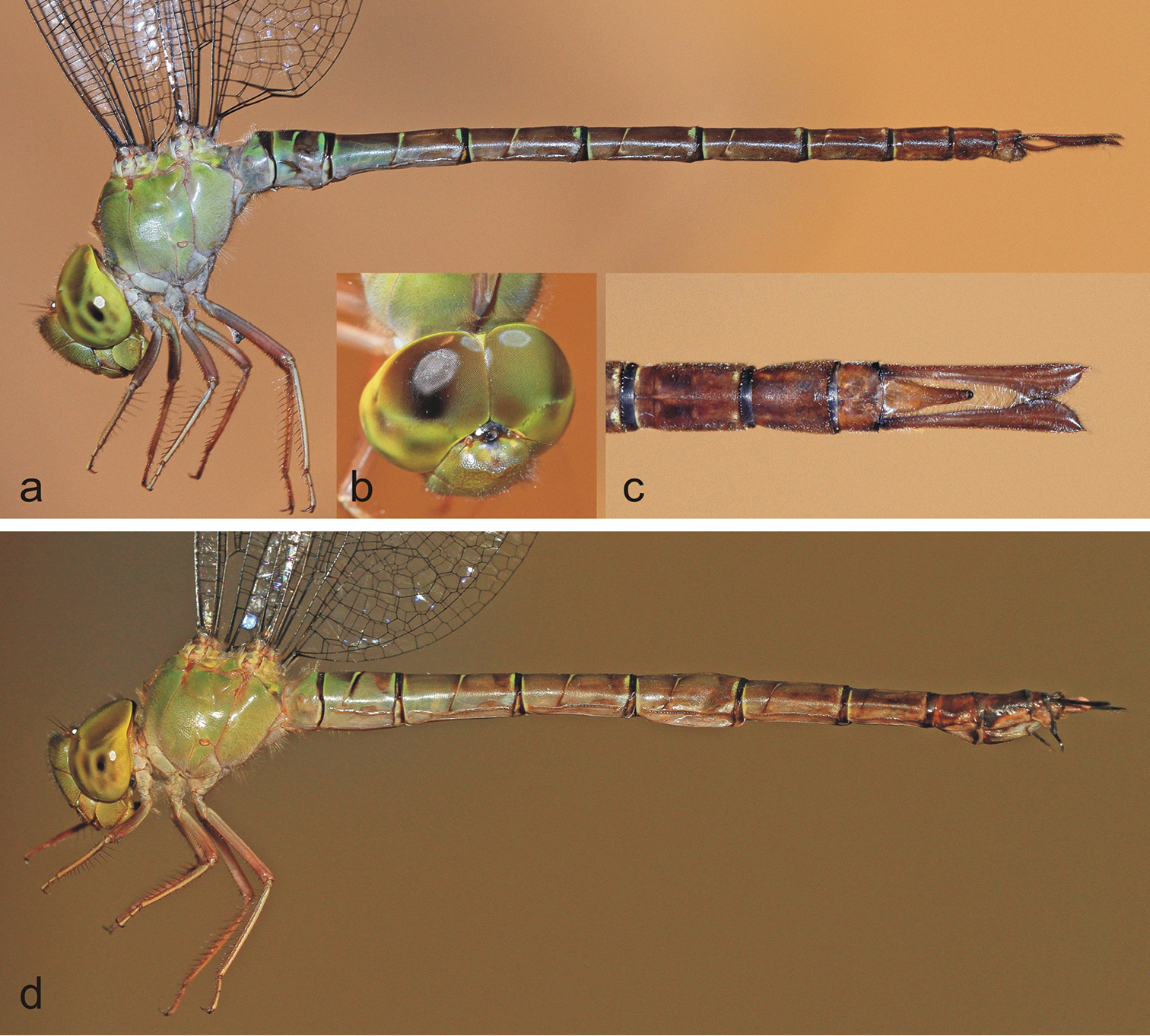
- male (top) and female (bottom)

Conservation status
- Least Concern (IUCN 3.1)

Scientific classification
- Kingdom: Animalia
- Phylum: Arthropoda
- Class: Insecta
- Order: Odonata
- Infraorder: Anisoptera
- Family: Aeshnidae
- Genus: Gynacantha
- Species: G. immaculifrons

Binomial name
- Gynacantha immaculifrons Fraser, 1956

= Gynacantha immaculifrons =

Species of dragonfly

Gynacantha immaculifrons is a species of dragonfly in the family Aeshnidae. It is found in the Democratic Republic of the Congo, Malawi, and Tanzania. Its natural habitats are subtropical or tropical moist lowland forests and shrub-dominated wetlands. It is threatened by habitat loss.
