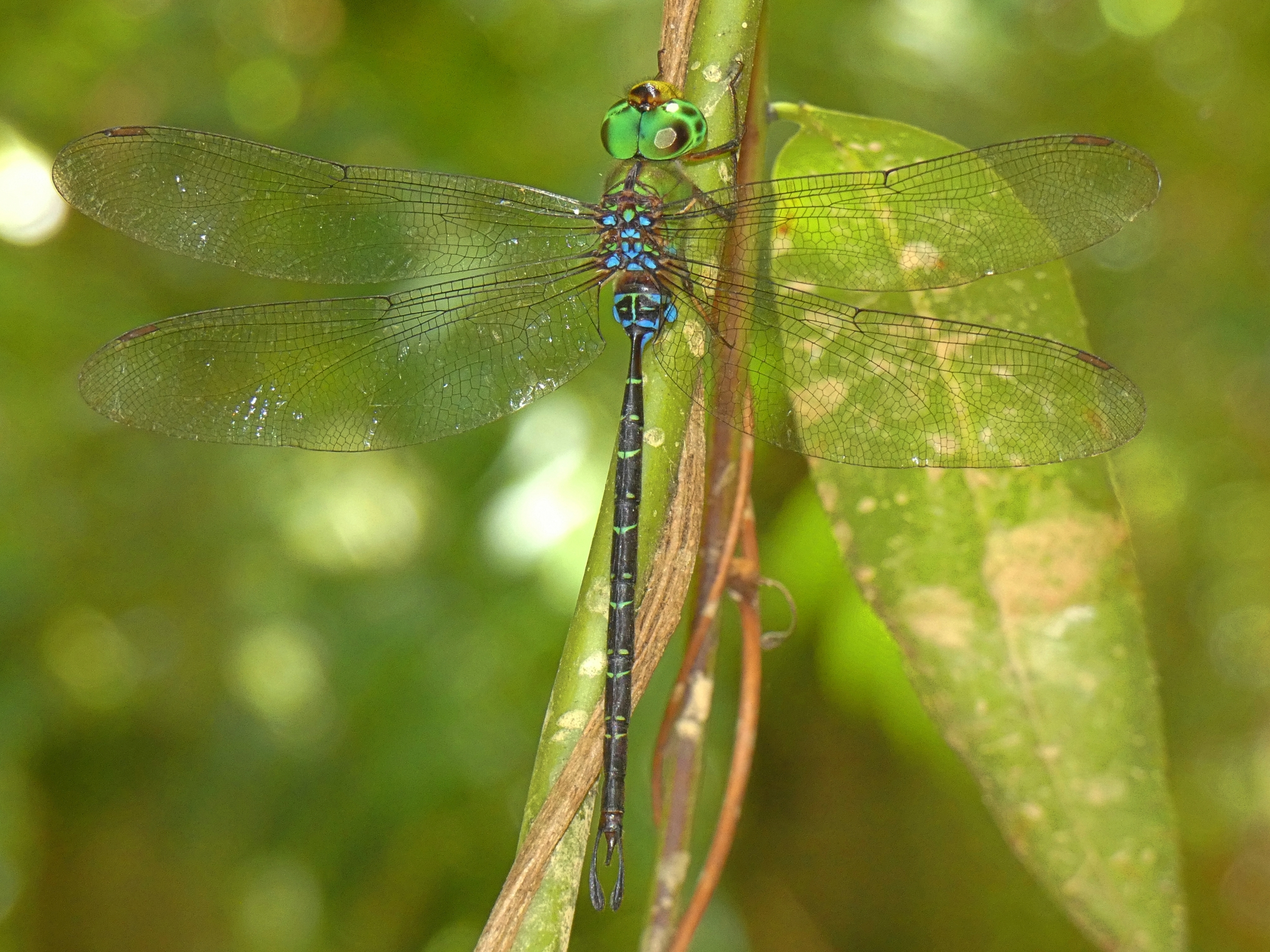
- Male
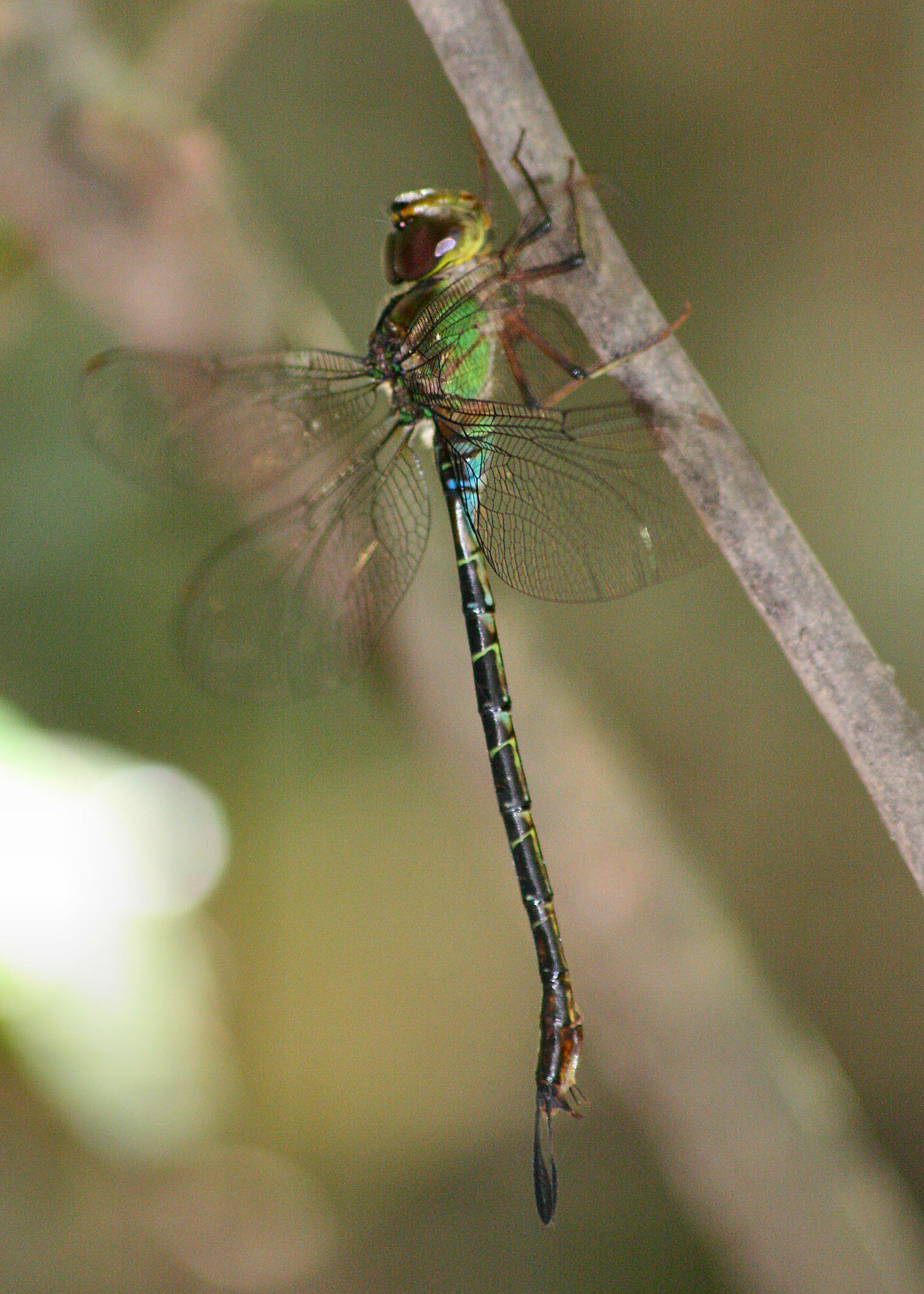
- Female

Conservation status
- Least Concern (IUCN 3.1)

Scientific classification
- Kingdom: Animalia
- Phylum: Arthropoda
- Clade: Pancrustacea
- Class: Insecta
- Order: Odonata
- Infraorder: Anisoptera
- Family: Aeshnidae
- Genus: Gynacantha
- Species: G. mocsaryi

Binomial name
- Gynacantha mocsaryi Förster, 1898

Synonyms
- Gynacantha simillima Förster, 1900

= Gynacantha mocsaryi =

Paddle-tipped duskhawker

Species of dragonfly

Gynacantha mocsaryi is a species of dragonfly in the family Aeshnidae, known as the paddle-tipped duskhawker. It is found in northern Queensland, Australia, the Maluku Islands and New Guinea.

Gynacantha mocsaryi is a large, dark coloured dragonfly with a strongly constricted waist in its abdomen at segment 3. Adult males have a blue colouring. It is a crepuscular insect and flies at dawn and dusk.

== Etymology ==
The genus name Gynacantha is derived from Greek γυνή (gynē, “woman”) and ἄκανθα (akantha, “thorn”). The name refers to the spines at the end of the female abdomen.

In 1898, Friedrich Förster named this species mocsaryi, an eponym honouring the entomologist Alexander Mocsáry (1841–1915), custodian of the Hungarian National Museum.

== Gallery ==
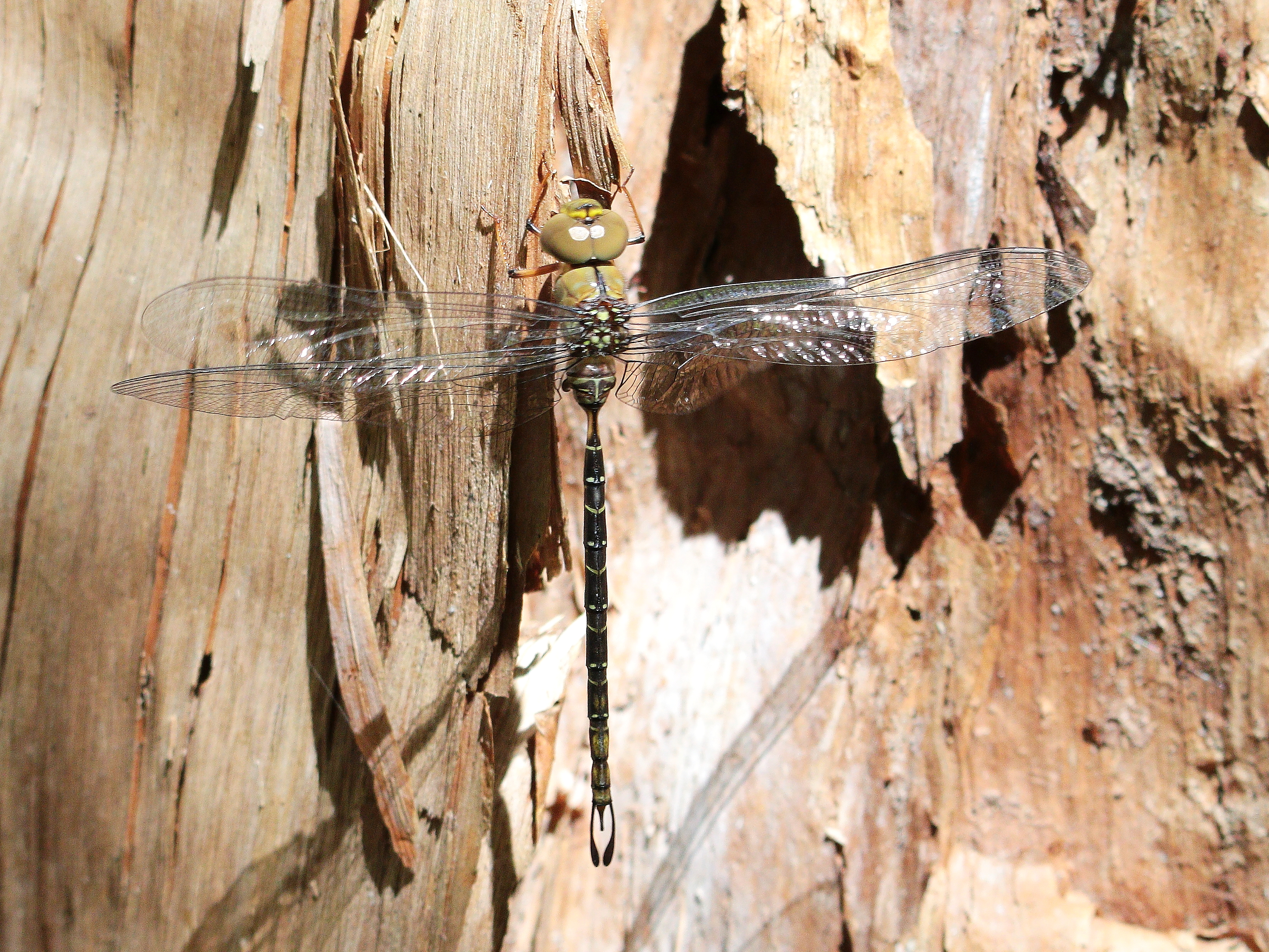
Recently emerged male, Cairns

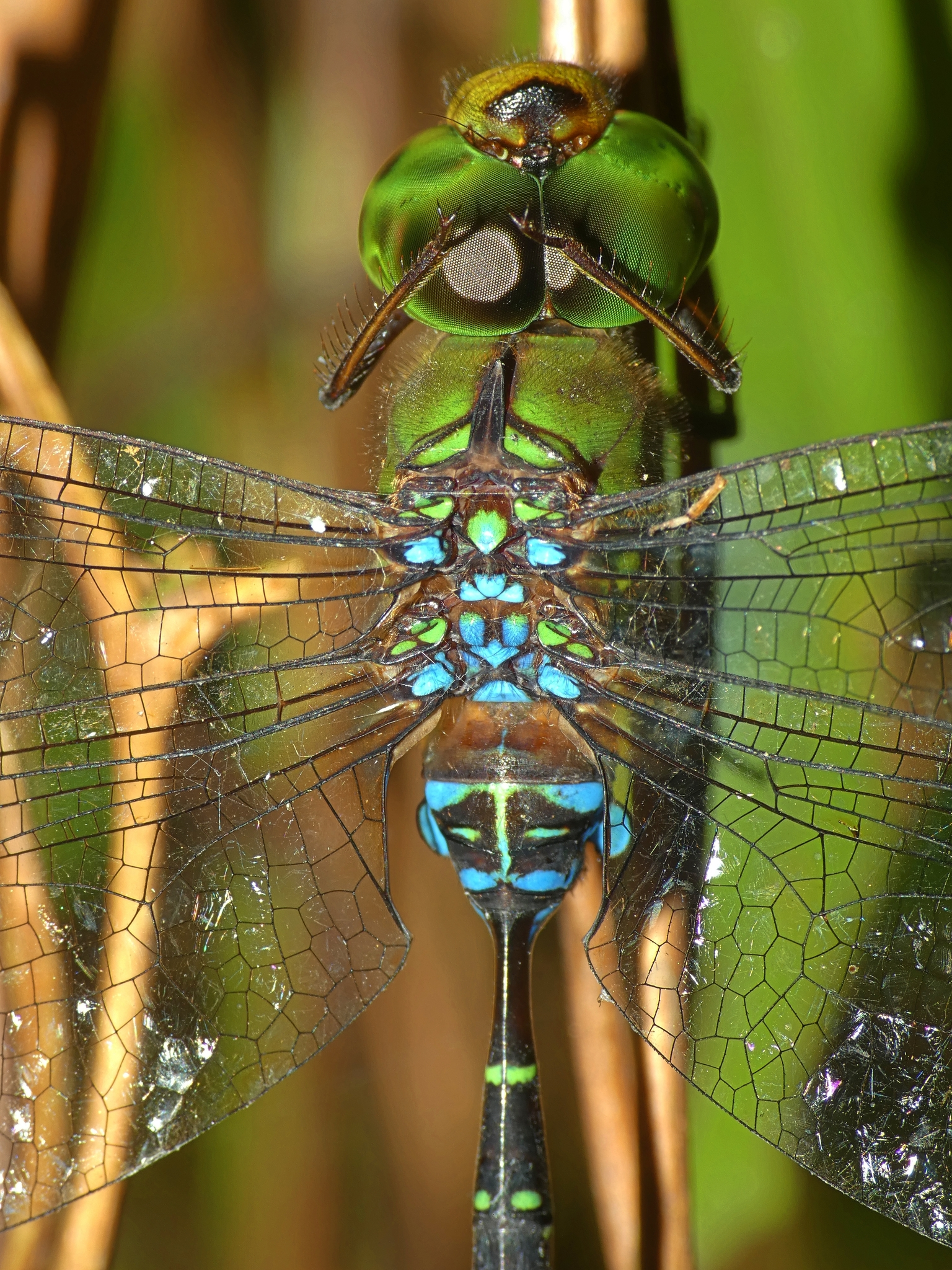
Abdomen is strongly constricted at segment 3

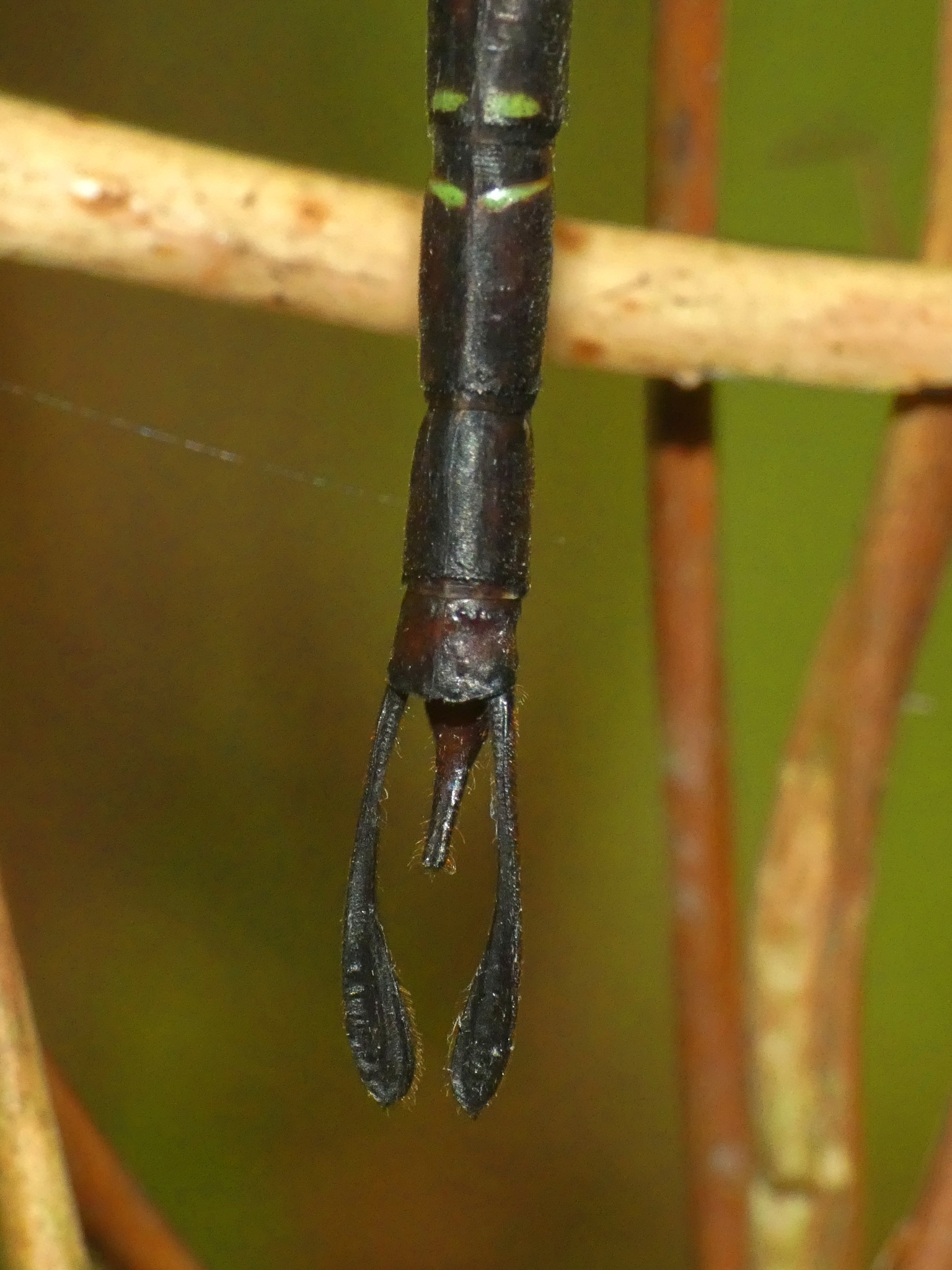
Male appendages

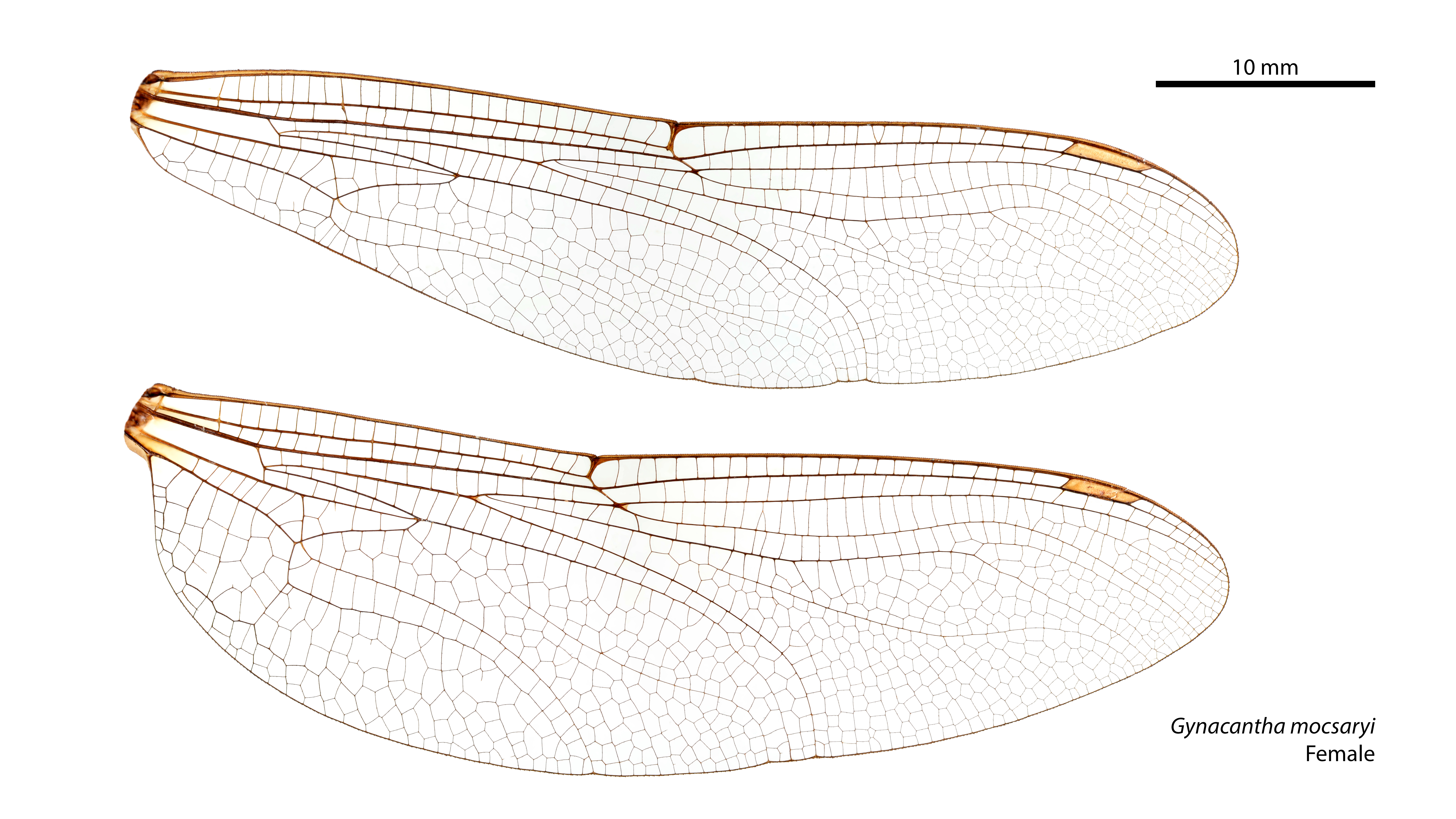
Female wings

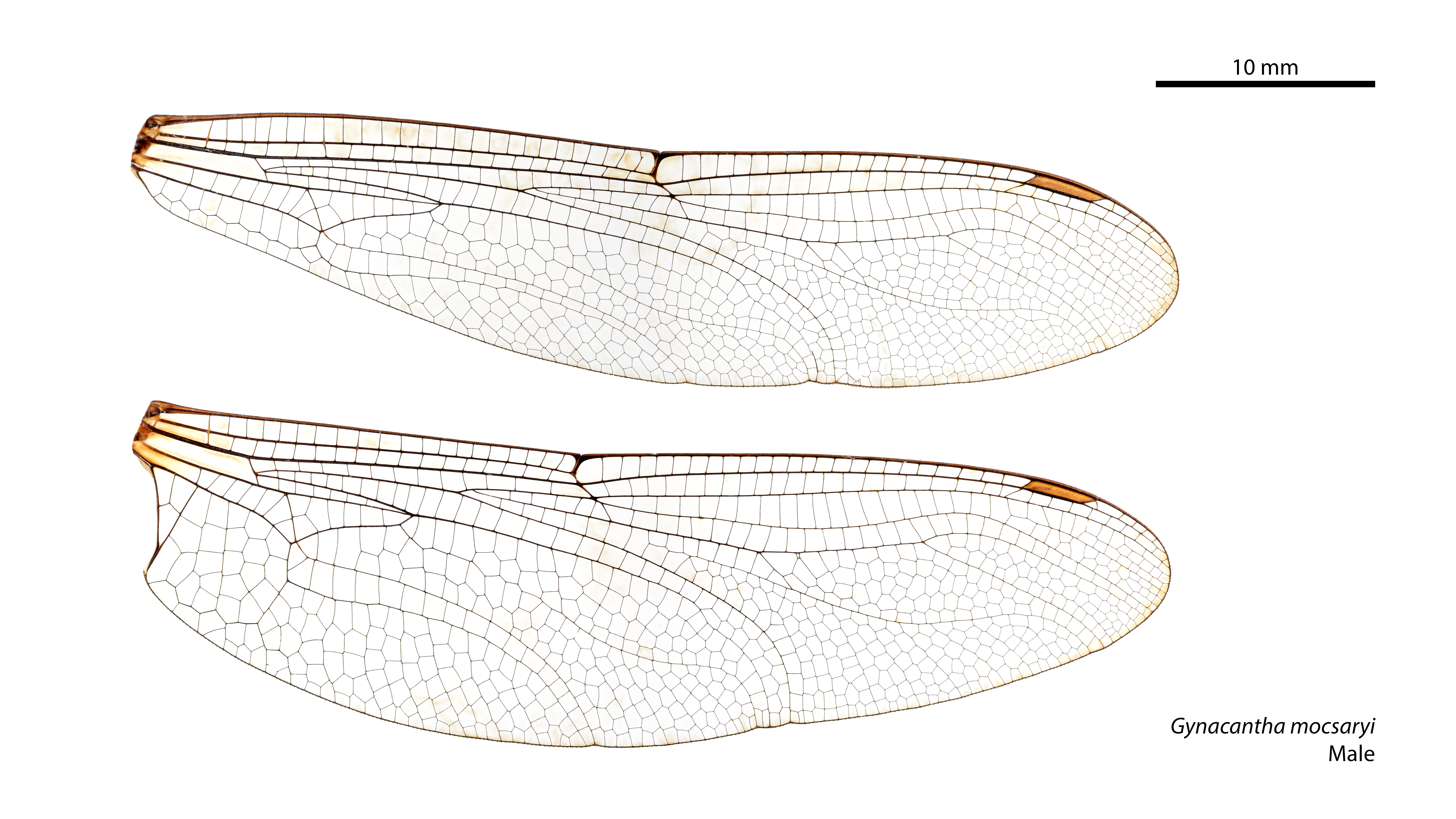
Male wings

== See also ==
- List of Odonata species of Australia
