= Gynacantha cylindrata =

Conservation status
- Least Concern (IUCN 3.1)

Scientific classification
- Kingdom: Animalia
- Phylum: Arthropoda
- Class: Insecta
- Order: Odonata
- Infraorder: Anisoptera
- Family: Aeshnidae
- Genus: Gynacantha
- Species: G. cylindrata

Binomial name
- Gynacantha cylindrata Karsch, 1891

Species of dragonfly

Gynacantha cylindrata is a species of dragonfly in the family Aeshnidae. It is found in Cameroon, Ivory Coast, Equatorial Guinea, Gabon, Ghana, Guinea, Liberia, Nigeria, Sierra Leone, Tanzania, Uganda, and possibly Somalia. Its natural habitats are subtropical or tropical moist lowland forests and shrub-dominated wetlands.
