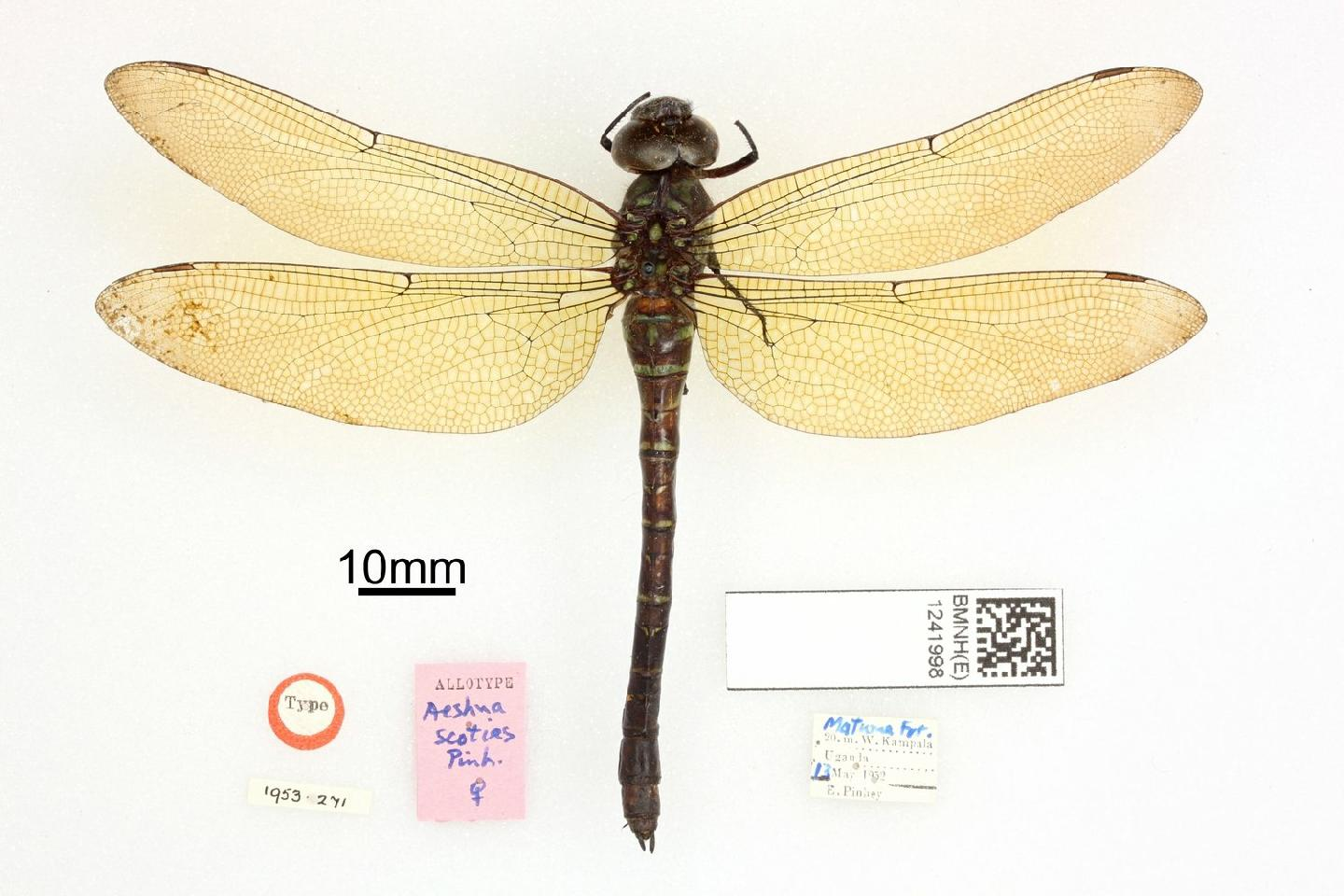

Conservation status
- Least Concern (IUCN 3.1)

Scientific classification
- Kingdom: Animalia
- Phylum: Arthropoda
- Class: Insecta
- Order: Odonata
- Infraorder: Anisoptera
- Family: Aeshnidae
- Genus: Afroaeschna; Peters & Theischinger, 2011
- Species: A. scotias

Binomial name
- Afroaeschna scotias (Pinhey, 1952)

Synonyms
- Aeshna scotias

= Afroaeschna =

Genus of dragonflies

Afroaeschna scotias is a species of dragonfly in the family Aeshnidae. It is found in Cameroon, Nigeria, Uganda, and Zambia. Its natural habitats are subtropical or tropical moist lowland forests and rivers. It is the only species in the genus Afroaeschna.
