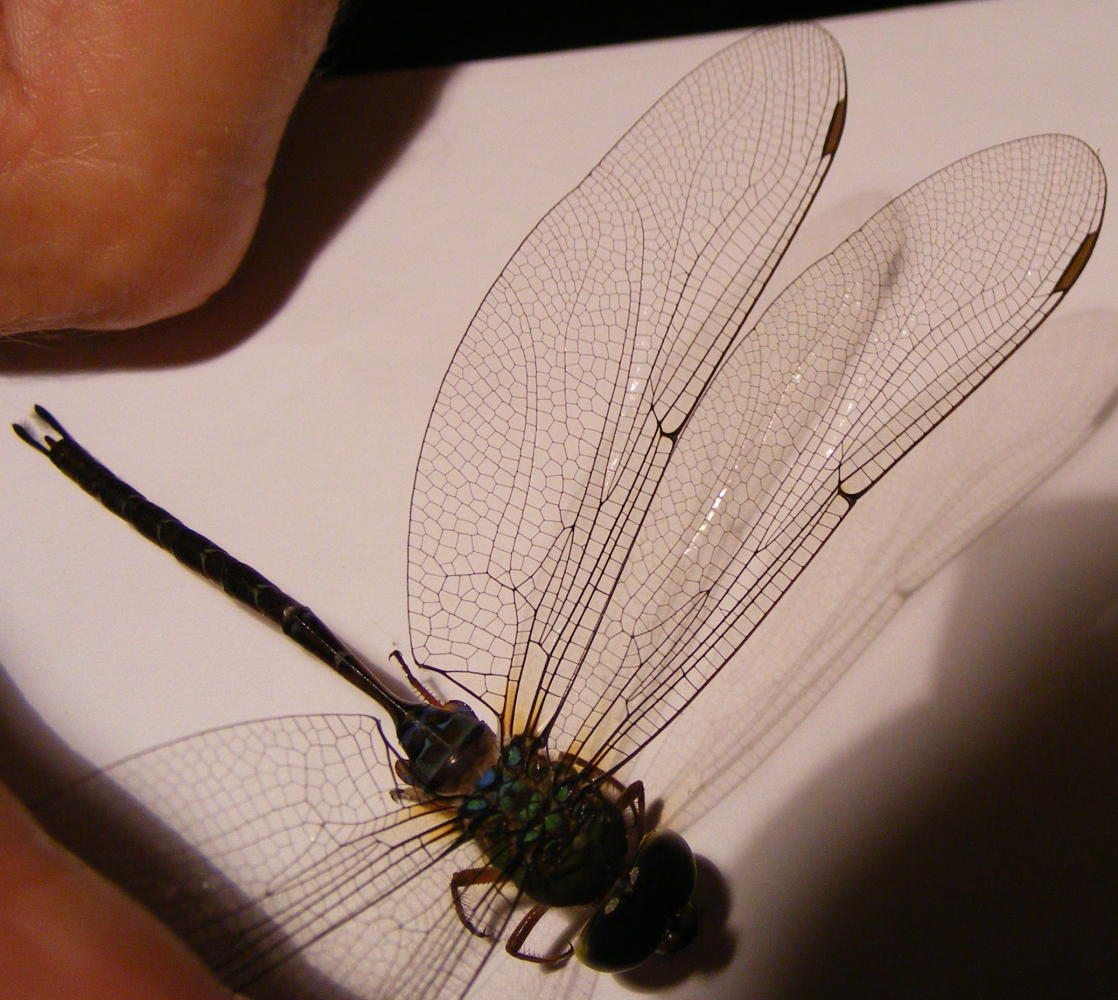

Conservation status
- Least Concern (IUCN 3.1)

Scientific classification
- Kingdom: Animalia
- Phylum: Arthropoda
- Class: Insecta
- Order: Odonata
- Infraorder: Anisoptera
- Family: Aeshnidae
- Genus: Gynacantha
- Species: G. usambarica

Binomial name
- Gynacantha usambarica Sjöstedt, 1909

= Gynacantha usambarica =

Species of dragonfly

Gynacantha usambarica is a species of dragonfly in the family Aeshnidae. It is found in Kenya, Malawi, Mozambique, South Africa, Tanzania, and Zimbabwe. Its natural habitats are subtropical or tropical moist lowland forests and shrub-dominated wetlands.
