= Gynacantha vesiculata =

Conservation status
- Least Concern (IUCN 3.1)

Scientific classification
- Kingdom: Animalia
- Phylum: Arthropoda
- Class: Insecta
- Order: Odonata
- Infraorder: Anisoptera
- Family: Aeshnidae
- Genus: Gynacantha
- Species: G. vesiculata

Binomial name
- Gynacantha vesiculata Karsch, 1891

Species of dragonfly

Gynacantha vesiculata is a species of dragonfly in the family Aeshnidae. It is found in Angola, Cameroon, the Republic of the Congo, Ethiopia, Ghana, Guinea, Liberia, Malawi, Mozambique, Nigeria, Sierra Leone, Tanzania, Uganda, and Zambia. Its natural habitats are subtropical or tropical moist lowland forests and shrub-dominated wetlands.
