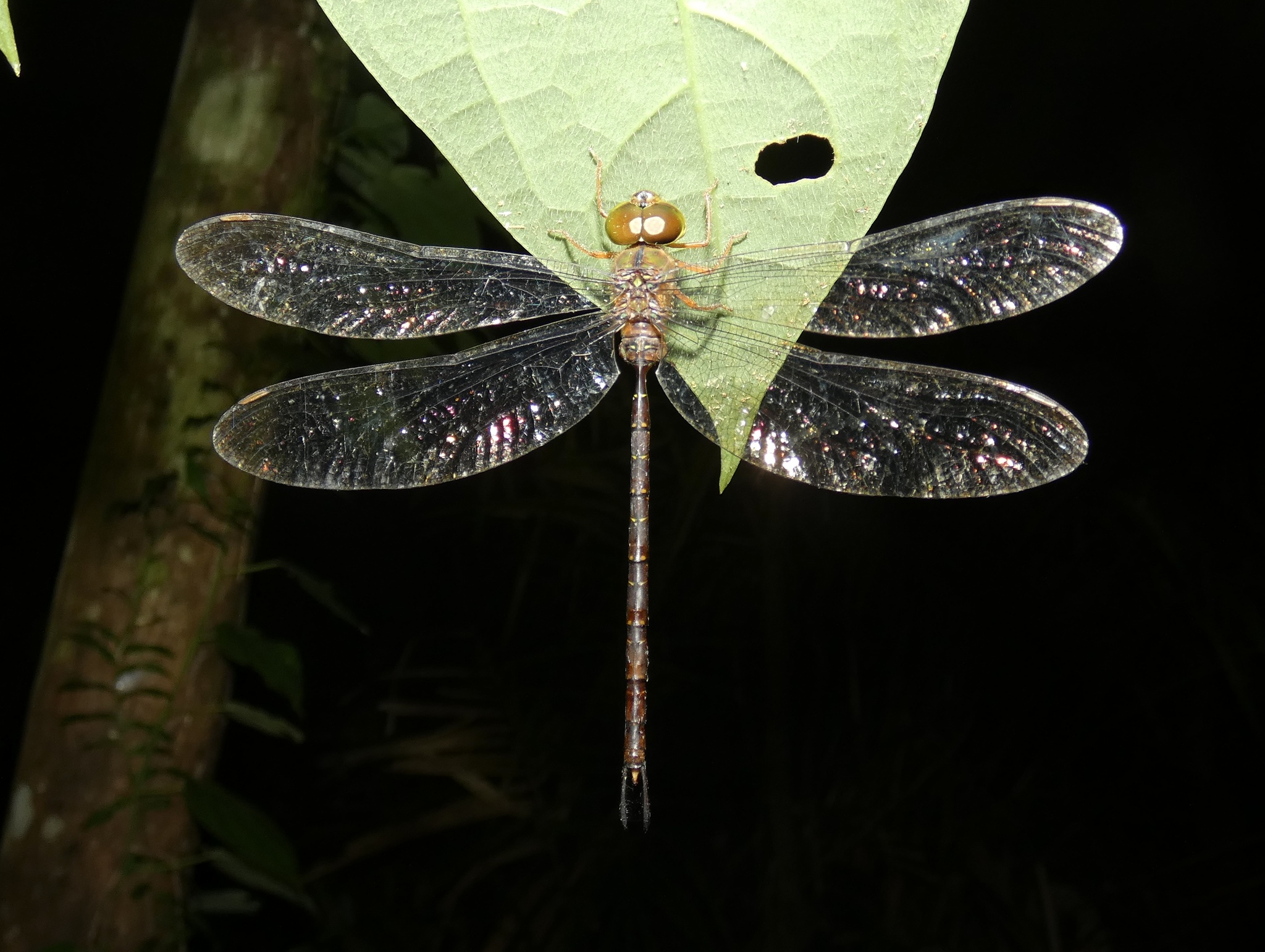
- Male

Conservation status
- Least Concern (IUCN 3.1)

Scientific classification
- Kingdom: Animalia
- Phylum: Arthropoda
- Clade: Pancrustacea
- Class: Insecta
- Order: Odonata
- Infraorder: Anisoptera
- Family: Aeshnidae
- Genus: Gynacantha
- Species: G. kirbyi

Binomial name
- Gynacantha kirbyi Krüger, 1898

= Gynacantha kirbyi =

Slender duskhawker

Species of dragonfly

Gynacantha kirbyi is a species of dragonfly in the family Aeshnidae, known as the slender duskhawker. It is found in northern Queensland, Australia, the Maluku Islands, Tanimbar and New Guinea.

Gynacantha kirbyi is a large, dull-coloured dragonfly with a strongly constricted waist in its abdomen at segment 3. Wings of the female have a brown colouring near their base. It is a crepuscular insect and flies at dawn and dusk.

== Etymology ==
The genus name Gynacantha is derived from Greek γυνή (gynē, “woman”) and ἄκανθα (akantha, “thorn”). The name refers to the spines at the end of the female abdomen.

In 1898, Leopold Krüger named this species kirbyi, an eponym honouring the English entomologist William Forsell Kirby (1844–1912).

== Gallery ==
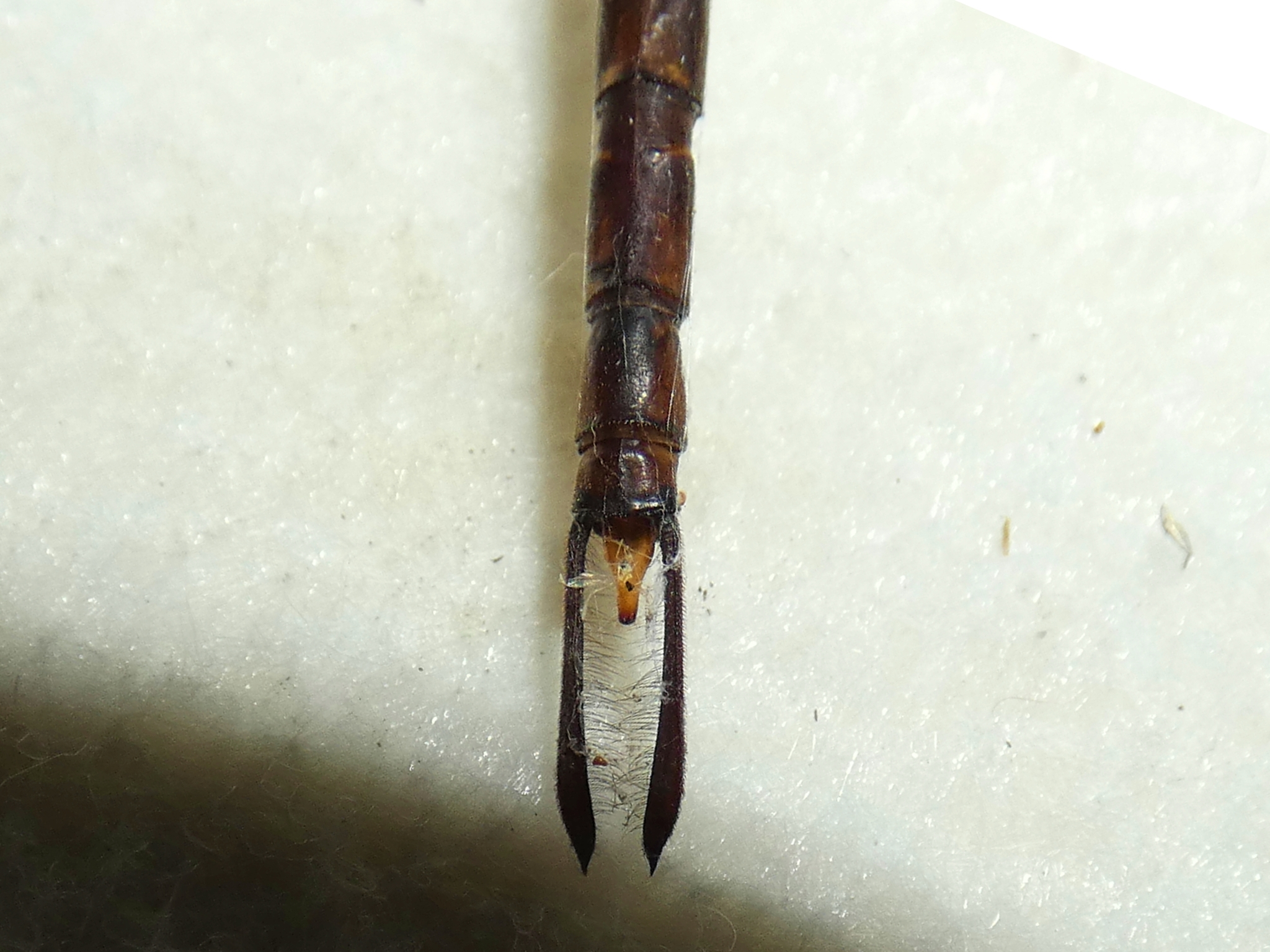
Male appendages

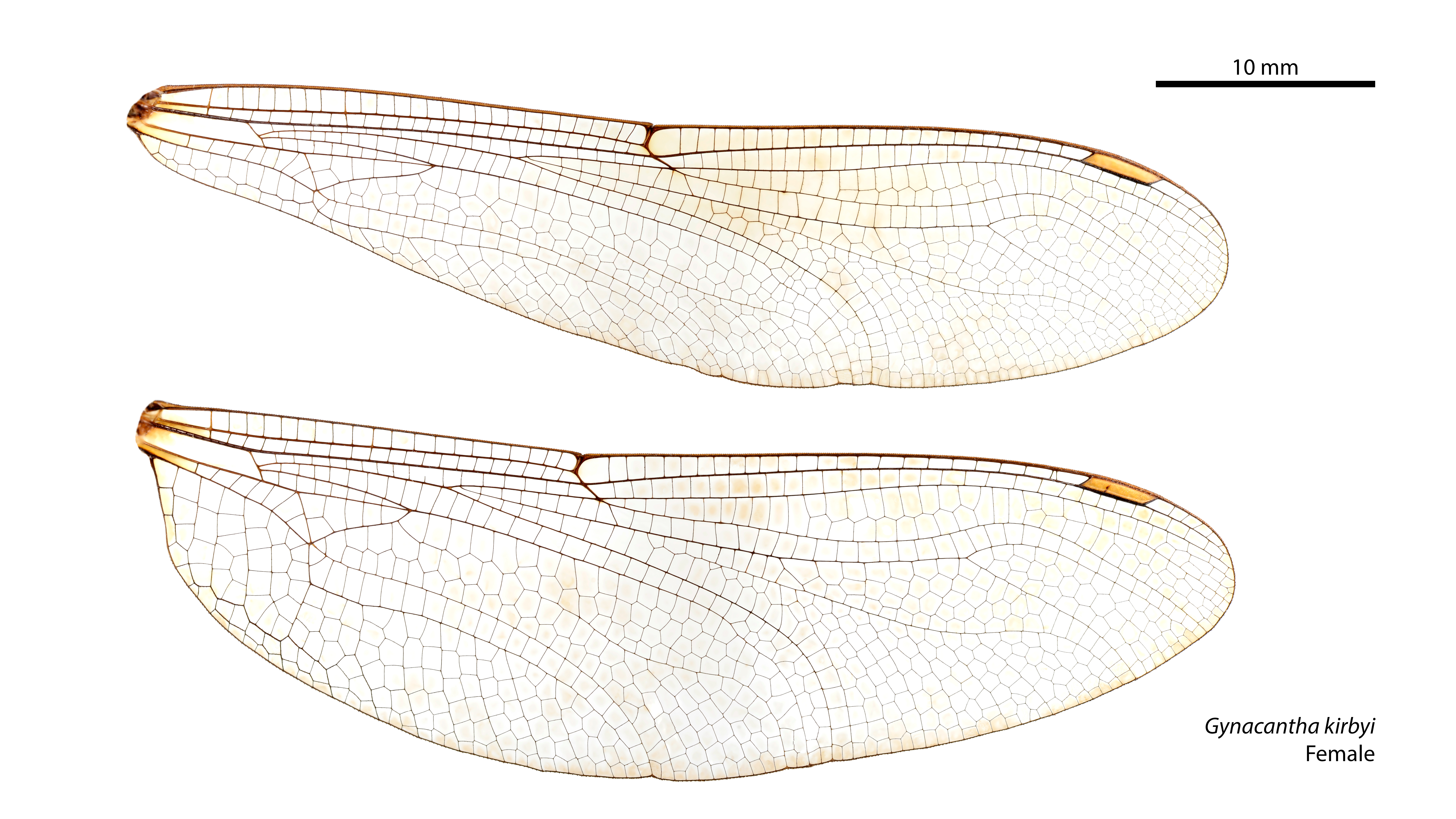
Female wings

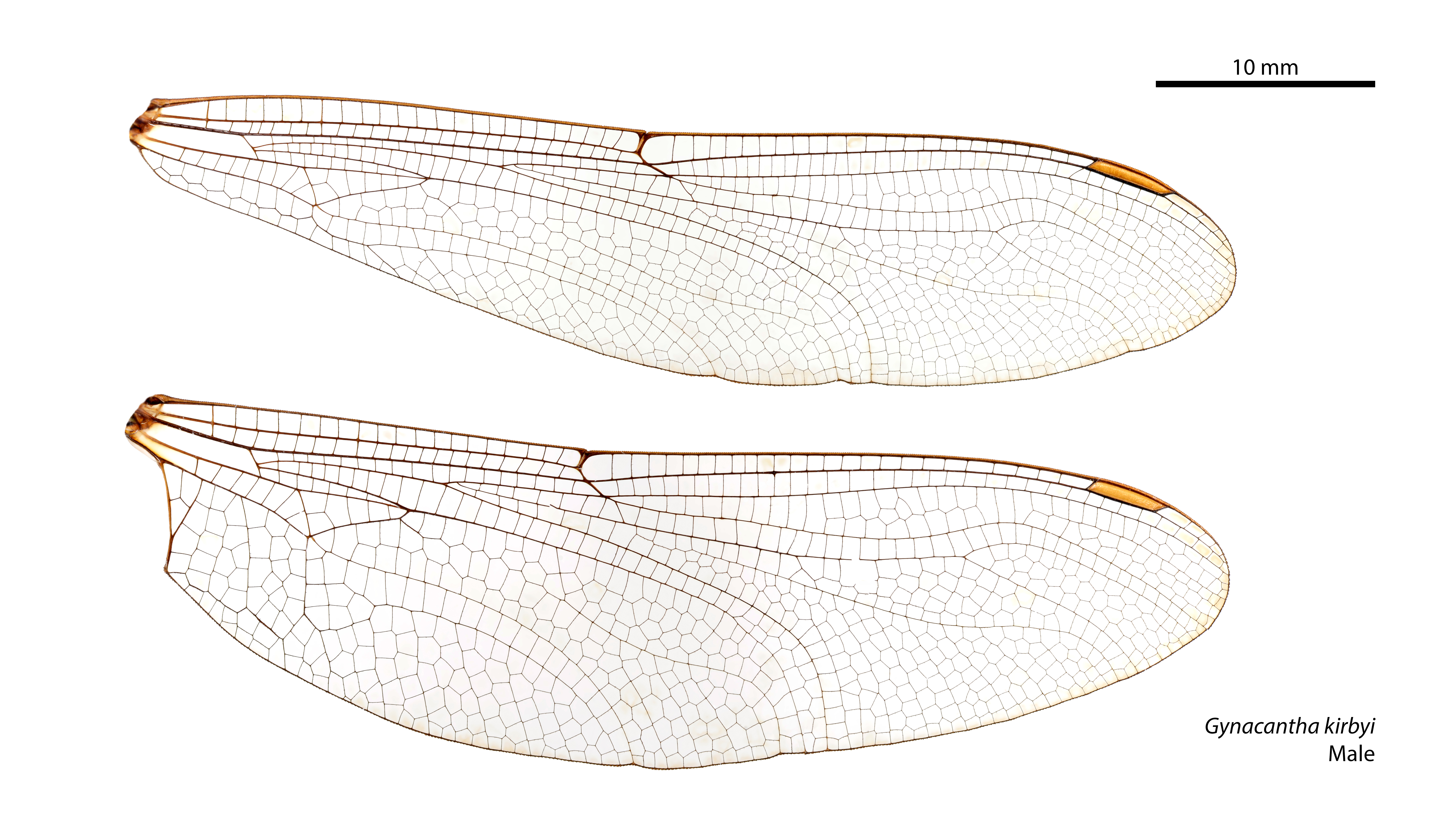
Male wings

== See also ==
- List of Odonata species of Australia
