= Gynacantha nourlangie =

Cave duskhawker
- Female Cave Duskhawker, Chillagoe

Conservation status
- Least Concern (IUCN 3.1)

Scientific classification
- Kingdom: Animalia
- Phylum: Arthropoda
- Clade: Pancrustacea
- Class: Insecta
- Order: Odonata
- Suborder: Anisoptera
- Family: Aeshnidae
- Genus: Gynacantha
- Species: G. nourlangie

Binomial name
- Gynacantha nourlangie Theischinger & Watson, 1991

Species of dragonfly

Gynacantha nourlangie is a species of dragonfly in the family Aeshnidae, known as the cave duskhawker. It inhabits pools in caves in northern Australia.

Gynacantha nourlangie is a large, sandy brown dragonfly with a constricted waist in its abdomen at segment 3. It is a crepuscular insect and flies at dawn and dusk. It is widely distributed across northern Australia, from the Kimberley in Western Australia, through the north of Northern Territory and Cape York in Queensland.

== Etymology ==
The genus name Gynacantha is derived from Greek γυνή (gynē, “woman”) and ἄκανθα (akantha, “thorn”). The name refers to the spines at the end of the female abdomen.

The species name nourlangie refers to Nourlangie Creek in western Arnhem Land, Northern Territory, where the species was first recorded.

== Gallery ==
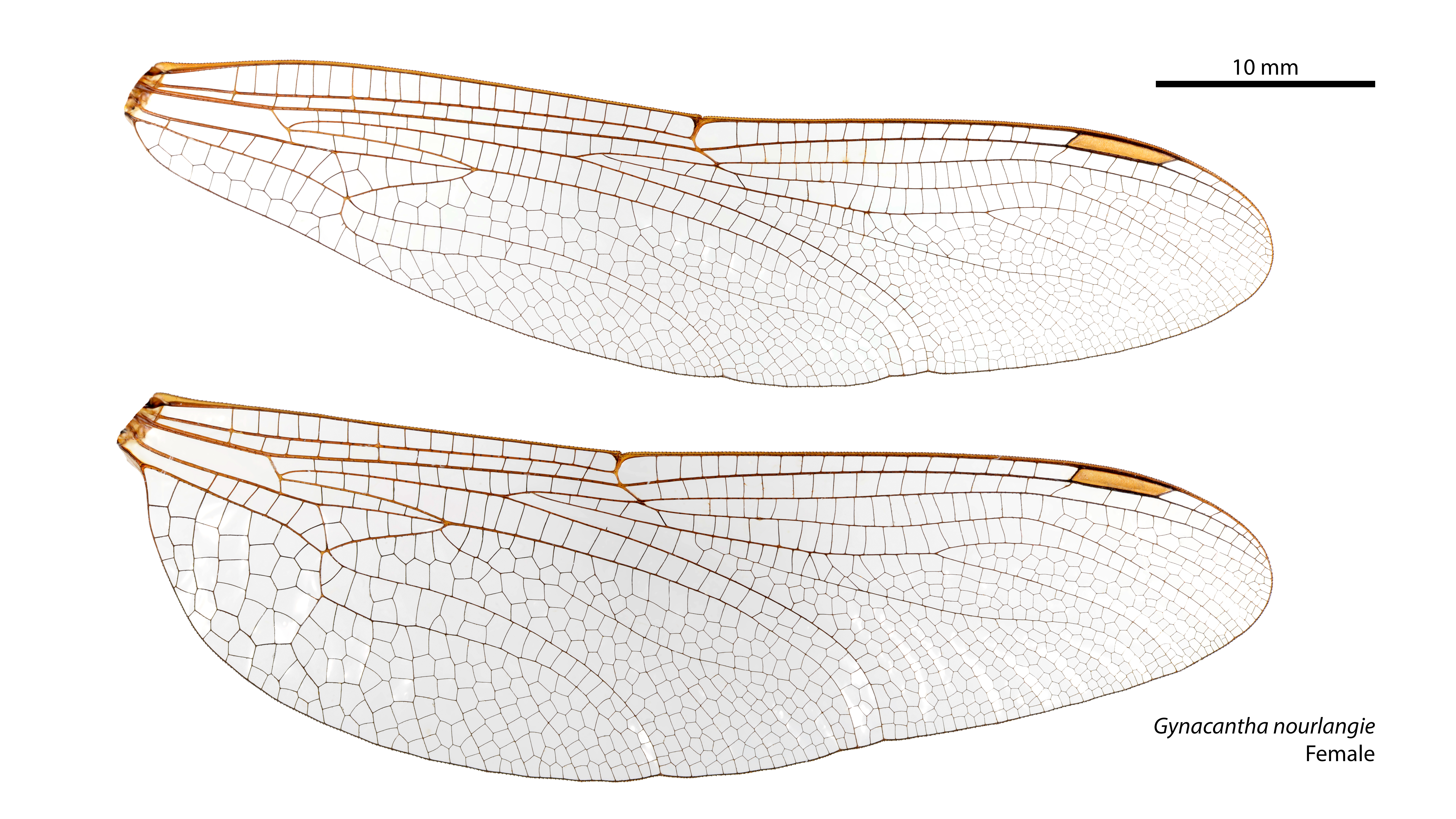
Female wings

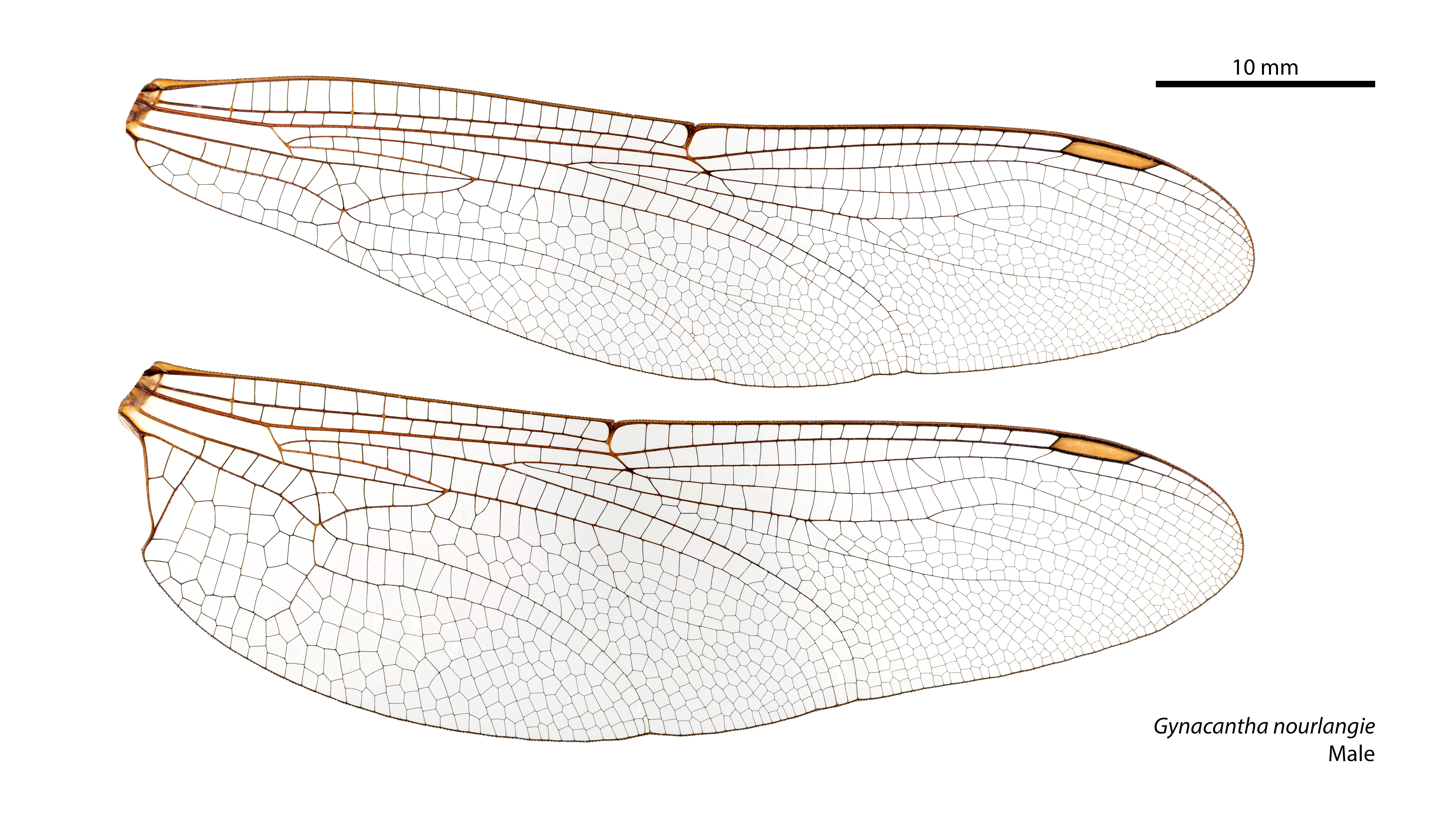
Male wings

== See also ==
- List of Odonata species of Australia
