= Sarasaeschna kunigamiensis =

Conservation status
- Endangered (IUCN 2.3)

Scientific classification
- Kingdom: Animalia
- Phylum: Arthropoda
- Class: Insecta
- Order: Odonata
- Infraorder: Anisoptera
- Family: Aeshnidae
- Genus: Sarasaeschna
- Species: S. kunigamiensis

Binomial name
- Sarasaeschna kunigamiensis (Ishida, 1972)

Synonyms
- Jagoria kunigamiensis Ishida, 1972; Oligoaeschna kunigamiensis (Ishida, 1972)

Species of dragonfly

Sarasaeschna kunigamiensis is a species of dragonfly in the family Aeshnidae. It is endemic to Japan.
