= Gynacantha nigeriensis =

Conservation status
- Least Concern (IUCN 3.1)

Scientific classification
- Kingdom: Animalia
- Phylum: Arthropoda
- Class: Insecta
- Order: Odonata
- Infraorder: Anisoptera
- Family: Aeshnidae
- Genus: Gynacantha
- Species: G. nigeriensis

Binomial name
- Gynacantha nigeriensis (Gambles, 1956)

Species of dragonfly

Gynacantha nigeriensis is a species of dragonfly in the family Aeshnidae. It is found in Cameroon, the Republic of the Congo, Ethiopia, Ghana, Guinea, Nigeria, Sierra Leone, Uganda, Zambia, and possibly Tanzania. Its natural habitats are subtropical or tropical moist lowland forests and shrub-dominated wetlands.
