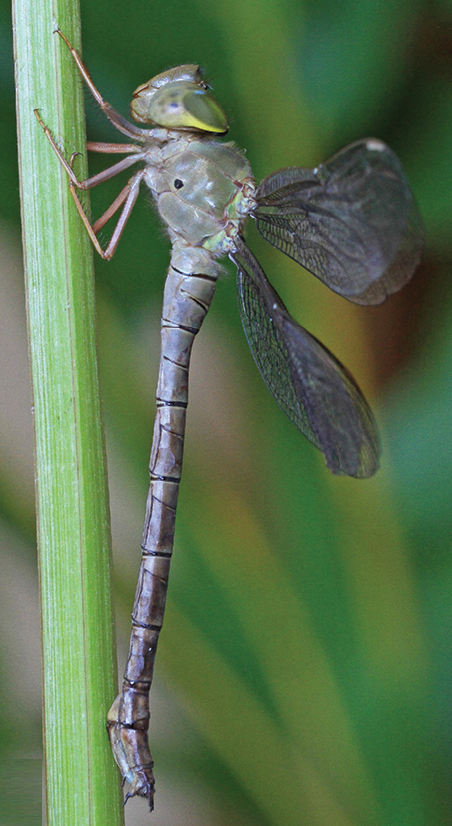

Conservation status
- Least Concern (IUCN 3.1)

Scientific classification
- Kingdom: Animalia
- Phylum: Arthropoda
- Class: Insecta
- Order: Odonata
- Infraorder: Anisoptera
- Family: Aeshnidae
- Genus: Gynacantha
- Species: G. villosa

Binomial name
- Gynacantha villosa Grünberg, 1902

= Gynacantha villosa =

Species of dragonfly

Gynacantha villosa is a species of dragonfly in the family Aeshnidae. It is found in Botswana, Burundi, Central African Republic, the Democratic Republic of the Congo, Ethiopia, Kenya, Malawi, Mozambique, South Africa, Tanzania, Uganda, Zambia, and possibly Burkina Faso. Its natural habitats are subtropical or tropical moist lowland forests and shrub-dominated wetlands.
