= Gynacantha sextans =

Conservation status
- Least Concern (IUCN 3.1)

Scientific classification
- Kingdom: Animalia
- Phylum: Arthropoda
- Class: Insecta
- Order: Odonata
- Infraorder: Anisoptera
- Family: Aeshnidae
- Genus: Gynacantha
- Species: G. sextans

Binomial name
- Gynacantha sextans McLachlan, 1896

Species of dragonfly

Gynacantha sextans is a species of dragonfly in the family Aeshnidae. It is found in Angola, Cameroon, the Democratic Republic of the Congo, Ivory Coast, Equatorial Guinea, Ghana, Guinea, Nigeria, Uganda, and Zambia. Its natural habitats are subtropical or tropical moist lowland forests and shrub-dominated wetlands.
