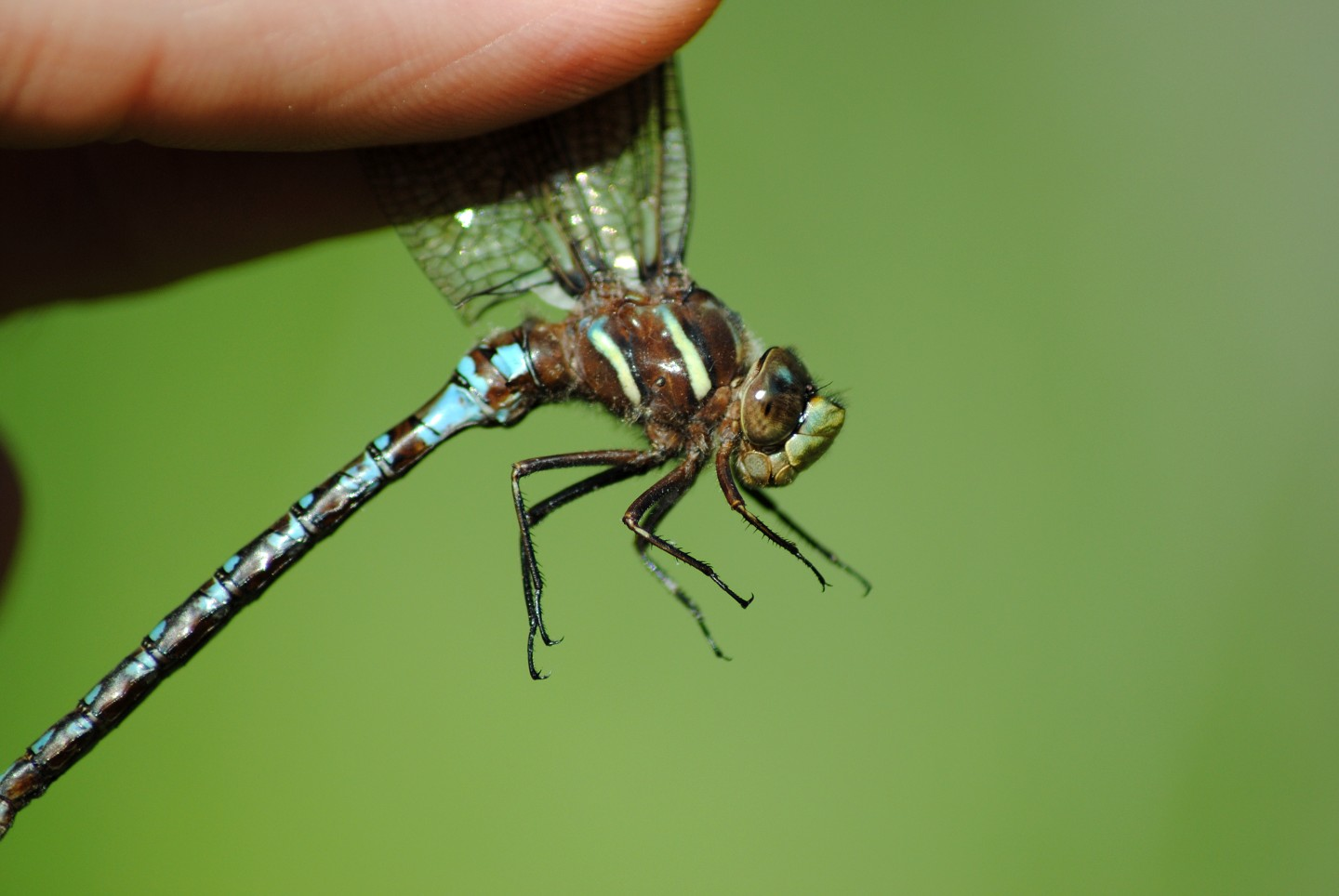

Scientific classification
- Kingdom: Animalia
- Phylum: Arthropoda
- Class: Insecta
- Order: Odonata
- Infraorder: Anisoptera
- Family: Aeshnidae
- Genus: Basiaeschna; Sélys, 1883
- Species: B. janata

Binomial name
- Basiaeschna janata (Say, 1840)

= Basiaeschna =

Springtime darner Temporal range: Late Paleocene/Early Eocene to present

Genus of dragonflies

Basiaeschna janata, the springtime darner, is a species of dragonfly in the monotypic genus Basiaeshna in the family Aeshnidae. It is a small, bluish darner that flies early in the year.

A fossil species, †Basiaeschna alaskaensis Garrouste & Nel, 2019 is known from the Chickaloon Formation of Alaska, around the time of the Paleocene-Eocene Thermal Maximum. It is the only definitive fossil member of this genus, and its presence in Alaska suggests that the ancestral Basiaeschna likely migrated from Eurasia to North America across Beringia. Two other fossil darner previously placed in this genus have been transferred into the extinct genus †Oligaeschna.
