= Brachytronidae =

Scientific classification
- Kingdom: Animalia
- Phylum: Arthropoda
- Clade: Pancrustacea
- Class: Insecta
- Order: Odonata
- Infraorder: Anisoptera
- Superfamily: Aeshnoidea
- Family: Brachytronidae; Cockerell, 1913

Historical grouping of damselflies

Brachytronidae was formerly considered a distinct family of dragonflies occurring in Australia. Up until recently, Dendroaeschna had been its only genus, and that is now placed in the family Aeshnidae. Brachytronidae is no longer recognised.
