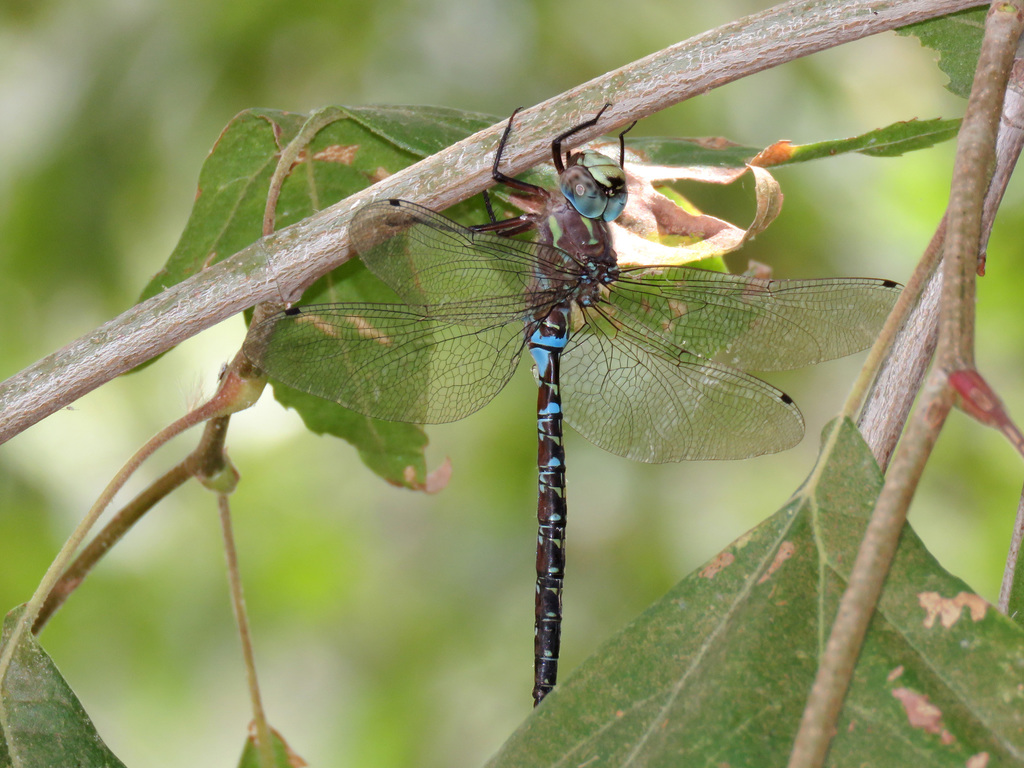

Conservation status
- Least Concern (IUCN 3.1)

Scientific classification
- Kingdom: Animalia
- Phylum: Arthropoda
- Class: Insecta
- Order: Odonata
- Infraorder: Anisoptera
- Family: Aeshnidae
- Genus: Oplonaeschna
- Species: O. armata

Binomial name
- Oplonaeschna armata (Hagen, 1861)

= Oplonaeschna armata =

Species of dragonfly

Oplonaeschna armata, the riffle darner, is a species of darner in the dragonfly family Aeshnidae. It is found in Central America and North America.

The IUCN conservation status of Oplonaeschna armata is "LC", least concern, with no immediate threat to the species' survival. The population is stable. The IUCN status was reviewed in 2017.
