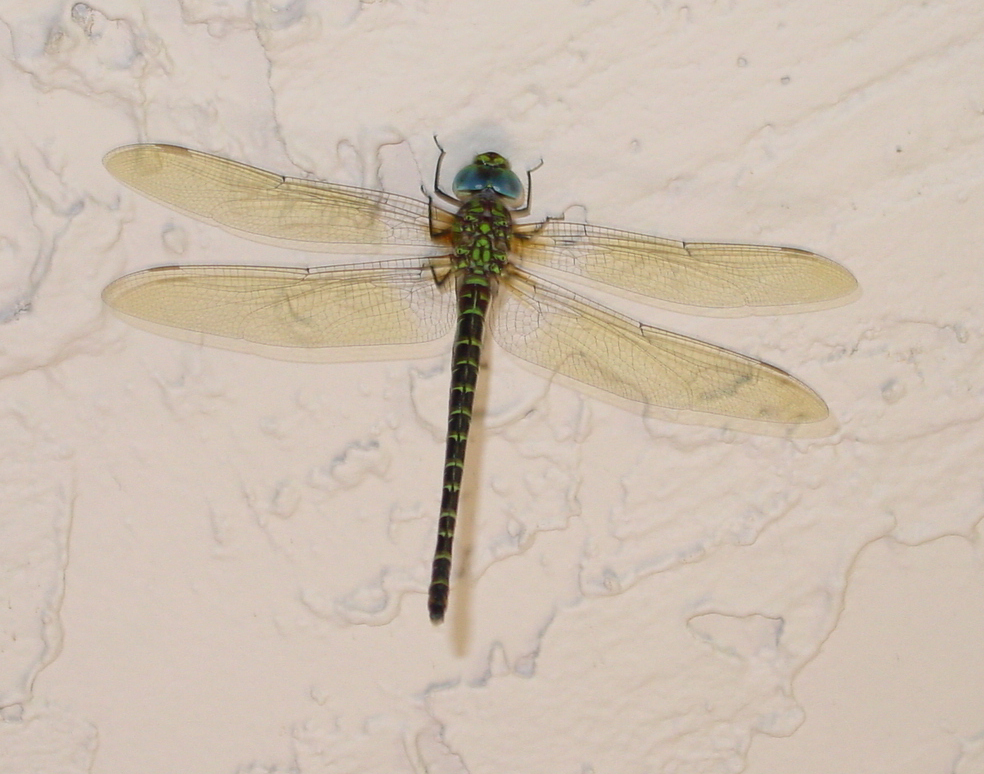

Conservation status
- Least Concern (IUCN 3.1)

Scientific classification
- Kingdom: Animalia
- Phylum: Arthropoda
- Class: Insecta
- Order: Odonata
- Infraorder: Anisoptera
- Family: Aeshnidae
- Genus: Coryphaeschna
- Species: C. ingens

Binomial name
- Coryphaeschna ingens (Rambur, 1842)

= Coryphaeschna ingens =

Species of dragonfly

Coryphaeschna ingens, the regal darner, is a species of darner in the dragonfly family Aeshnidae. It is found in the Caribbean Sea and North America.

The IUCN conservation status of Coryphaeschna ingens is "LC", least concern, with no immediate threat to the species' survival. The population is stable. The IUCN status was reviewed in 2017.
