= Agyrtacantha dirupta =

Trifid duskhawker

Conservation status
- Least Concern (IUCN 3.1)

Scientific classification
- Kingdom: Animalia
- Phylum: Arthropoda
- Clade: Pancrustacea
- Class: Insecta
- Order: Odonata
- Infraorder: Anisoptera
- Family: Aeshnidae
- Genus: Agyrtacantha
- Species: A. dirupta

Binomial name
- Agyrtacantha dirupta (Karsch, 1889)

Synonyms
- Triacanthagyna dirupta Karsch, 1889; Platacantha foersteri Martin, 1909

Species of dragonfly

Agyrtacantha dirupta is a species of dragonfly in the family Aeshnidae, commonly known as the trifid duskhawker. It has been found from the Maluku Islands through Australia to the Pacific.

Agyrtacantha dirupta is a large, dark dragonfly with green, brown and black colour variations. It inhabits still and brackish water. Adults are nomadic and fly at dusk.

== Etymology ==
The genus name Agyrtacantha combines the Greek ἀγύρτης (agyrtēs, "imposter" or "charlatan"), referring to confusion surrounding its earlier classification, with ἄκανθα (akantha, "thorn" or "spine"), referring to the spines at the tip of the female abdomen.

The species name dirupta is derived from the Latin dirumpo ("to break apart" or "rupture"), possibly referring to the unexpected discovery of this species far from the previously known range of the genus Triacanthagyna.

== Gallery ==
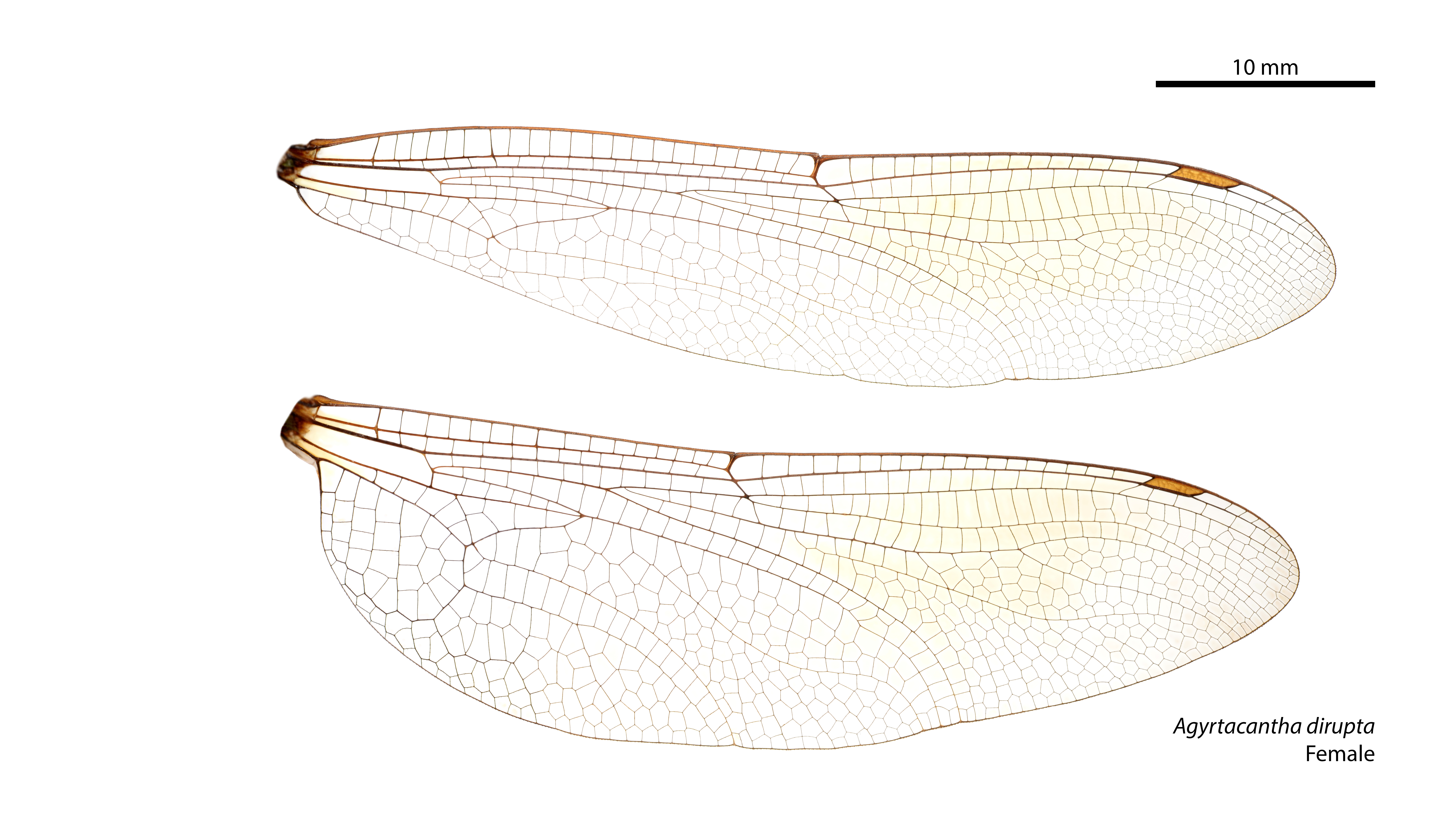
Female wings

== See also ==
- List of dragonflies of Australia
