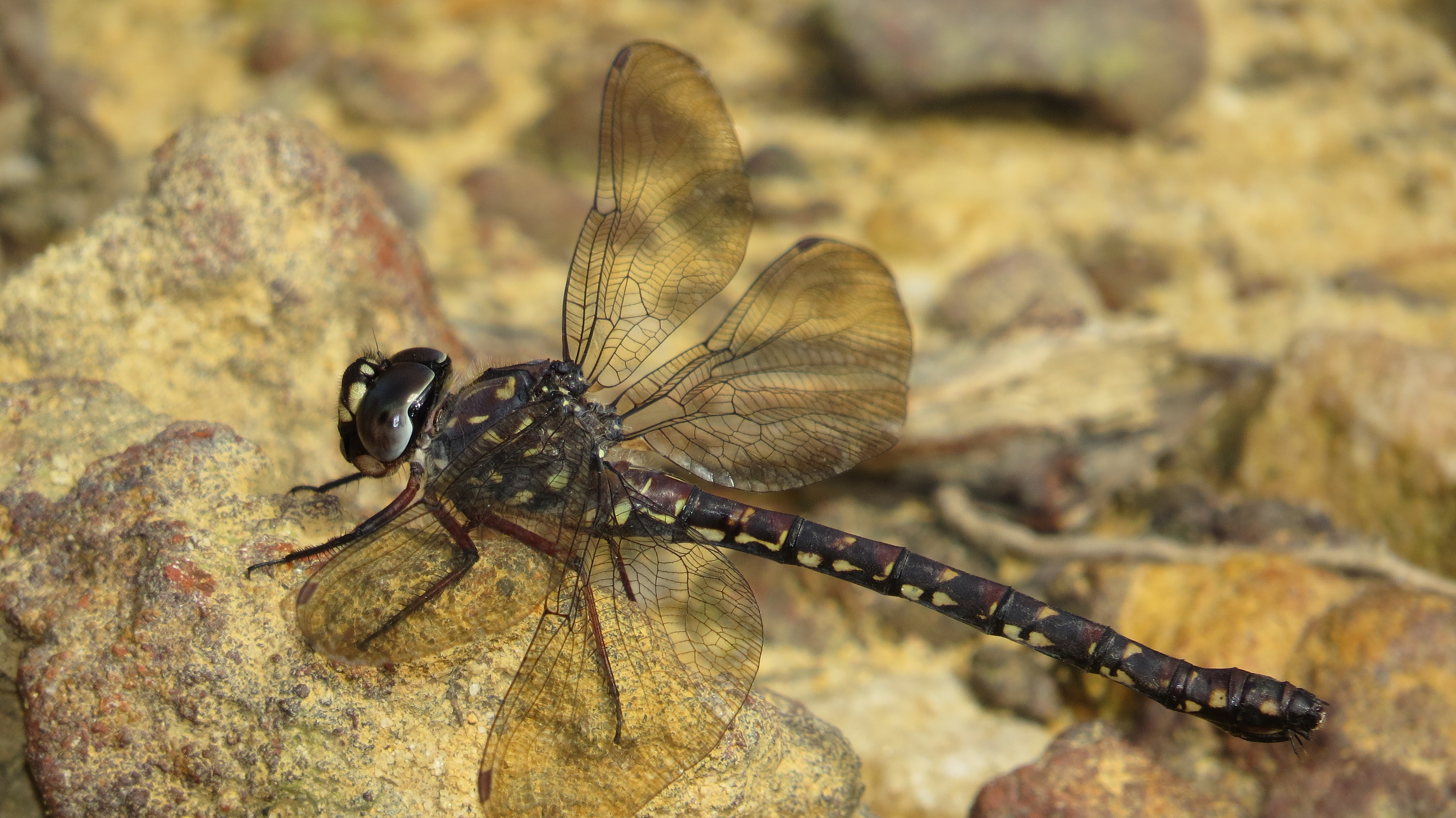
- Female Austroaeschna obscura

Conservation status
- Least Concern (IUCN 3.1)

Scientific classification
- Kingdom: Animalia
- Phylum: Arthropoda
- Clade: Pancrustacea
- Class: Insecta
- Order: Odonata
- Suborder: Anisoptera
- Family: Aeshnidae
- Genus: Austroaeschna
- Species: A. obscura

Binomial name
- Austroaeschna obscura Theischinger, 1982

= Austroaeschna obscura =

Sydney mountain darner

Species of dragonfly

Austroaeschna obscura is a large species of dragonfly in the family Aeshnidae, known as the Sydney mountain darner. It is found in the Sydney Basin in Australia, where it inhabits rivers and streams.

Austroaeschna obscura is a very dark dragonfly with distinct pale markings. It appears similar to the more widespread multi-spotted darner, Austroaeschna multipunctata.

== Etymology ==
The genus name Austroaeschna combines the prefix austro- (from Latin auster, meaning “south wind”, hence “southern”) with Aeshna, a genus of dragonflies.

The species name obscura is derived from the Latin obscurus ("dark" or "obscured"), referring to its darker colouring compared with Austroaeschna multipunctata.

== Gallery ==
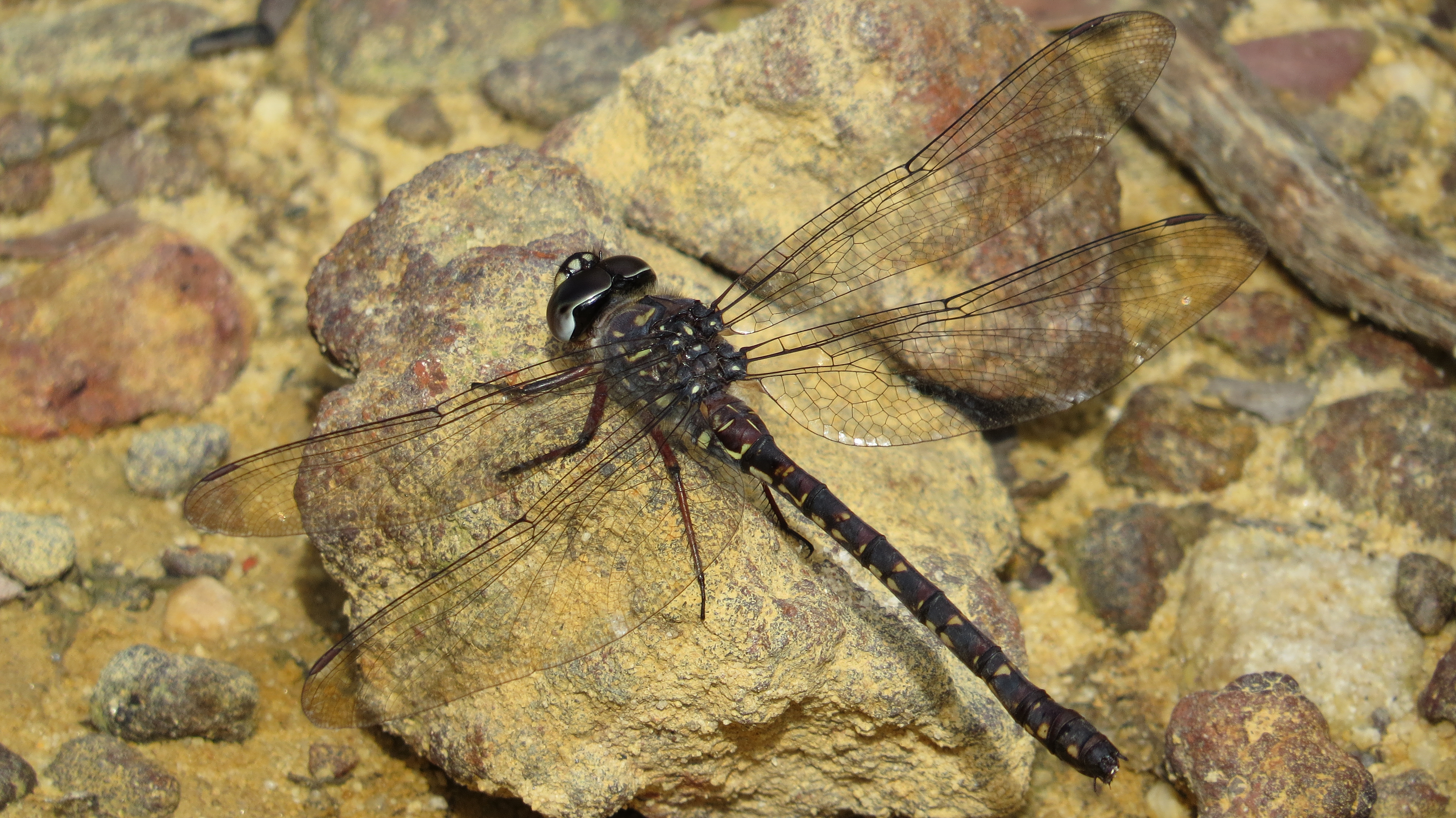
Female Austroaeschna obscura

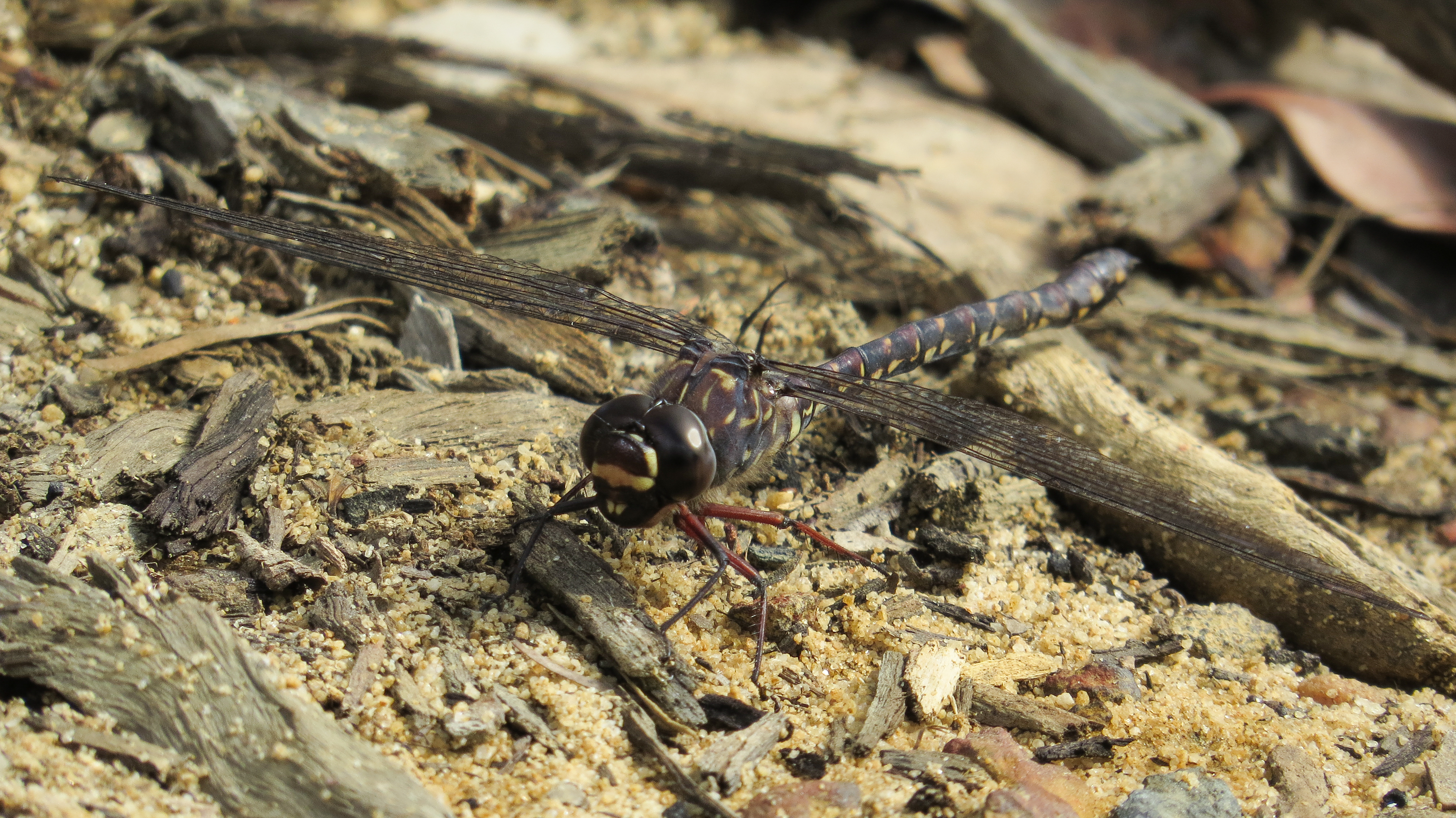
Female face

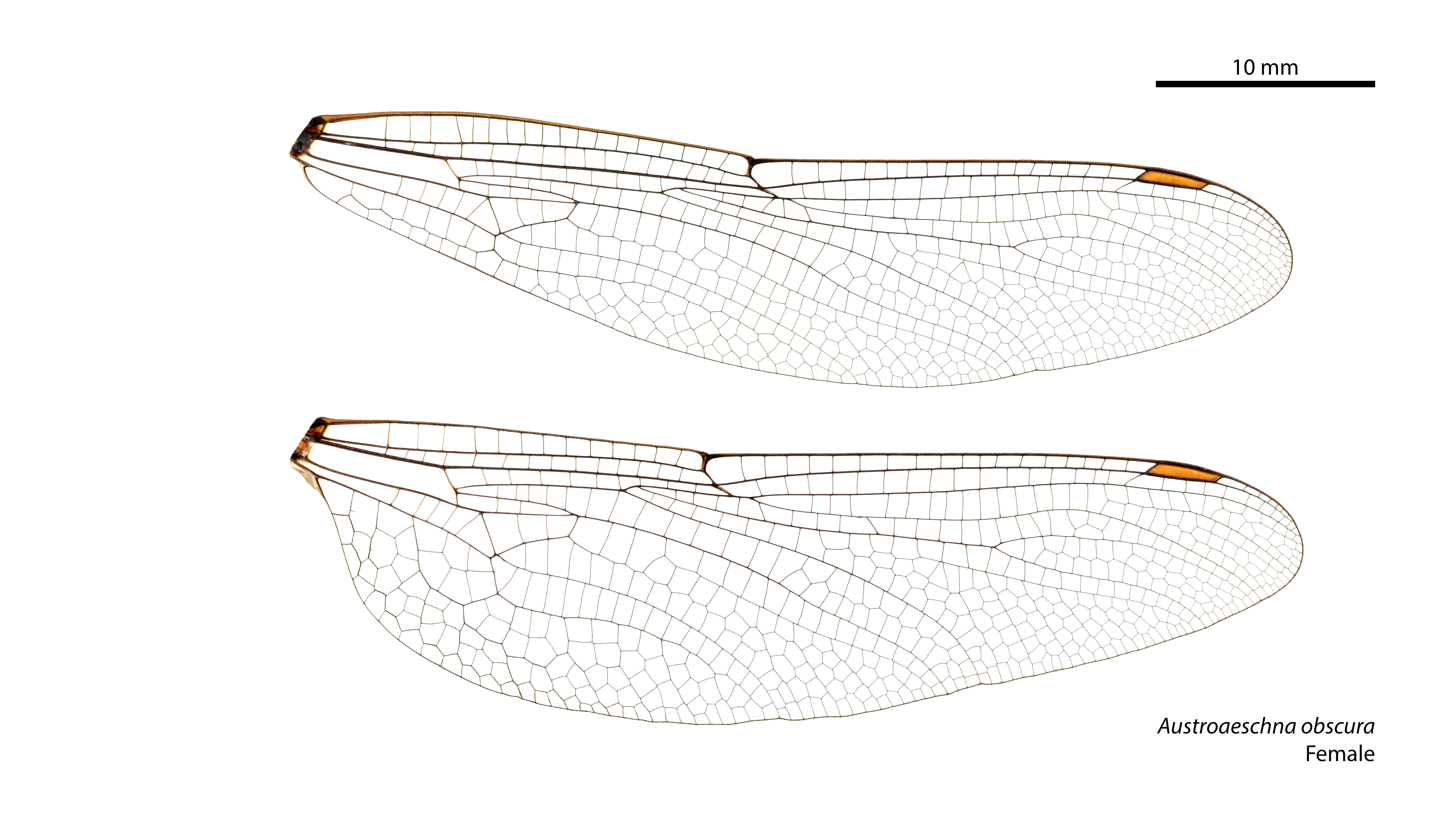
Female wings

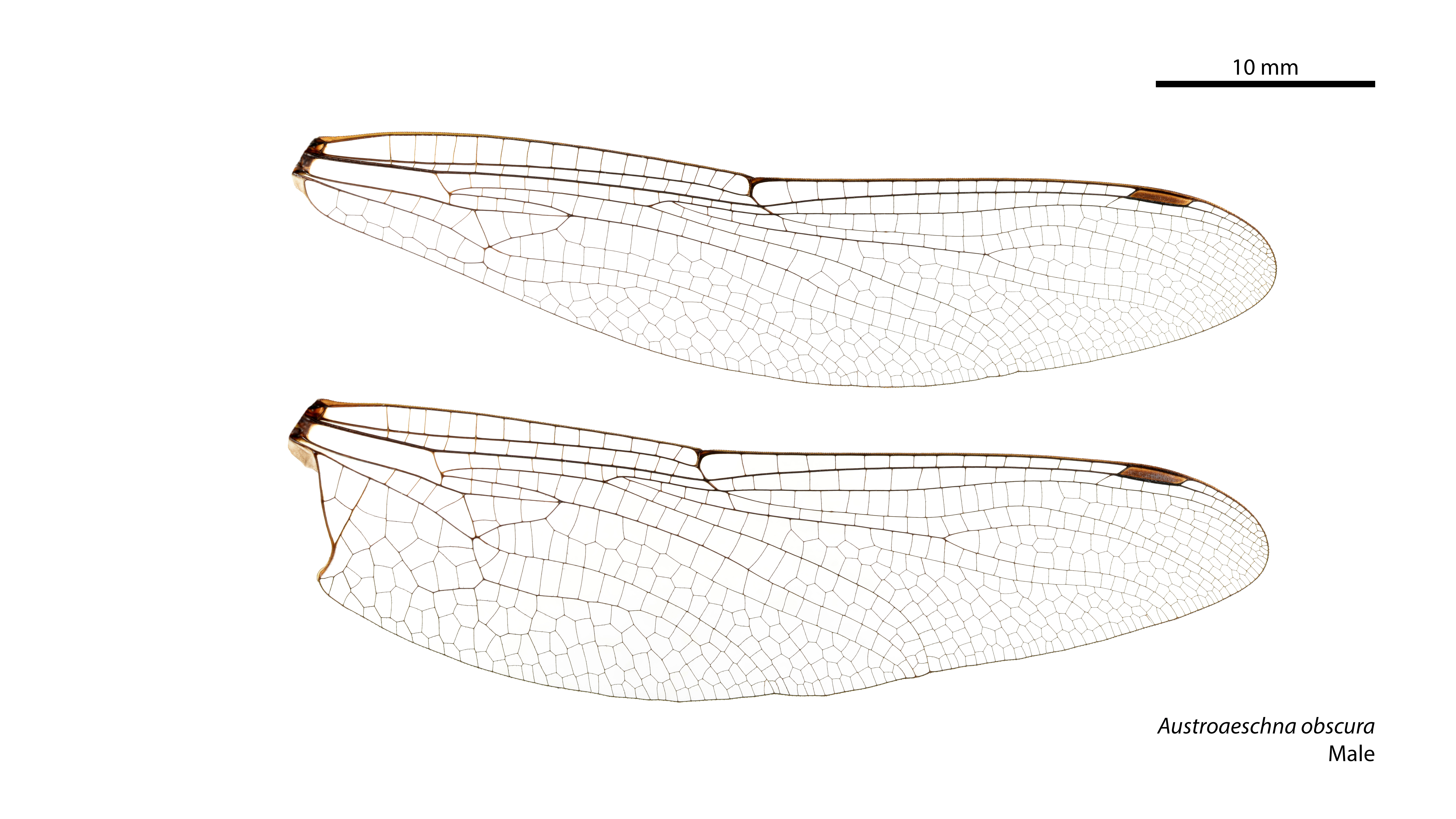
Male wings

== See also ==
- List of dragonflies of Australia
