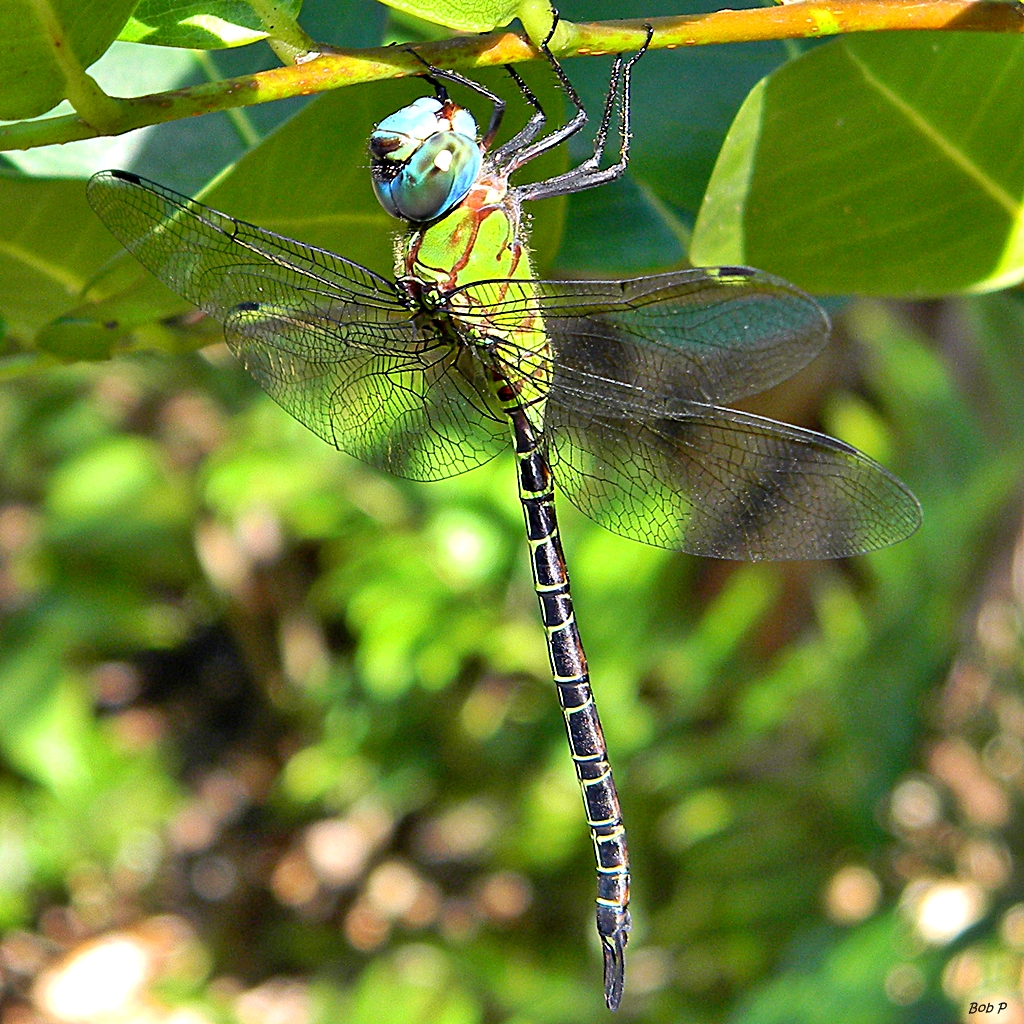

Conservation status
- Least Concern (IUCN 3.1)

Scientific classification
- Kingdom: Animalia
- Phylum: Arthropoda
- Class: Insecta
- Order: Odonata
- Infraorder: Anisoptera
- Family: Aeshnidae
- Genus: Coryphaeschna
- Species: C. adnexa

Binomial name
- Coryphaeschna adnexa (Hagen, 1861)

= Coryphaeschna adnexa =

Species of dragonfly

Coryphaeschna adnexa, the blue-faced darner, is a species of darner in the dragonfly family Aeshnidae. It is found in the Caribbean Sea, Central America, North America, and South America.

The IUCN conservation status of Coryphaeschna adnexa is "LC", least concern, with no immediate threat to the species' survival. The population is stable. The IUCN status was reviewed in 2017.

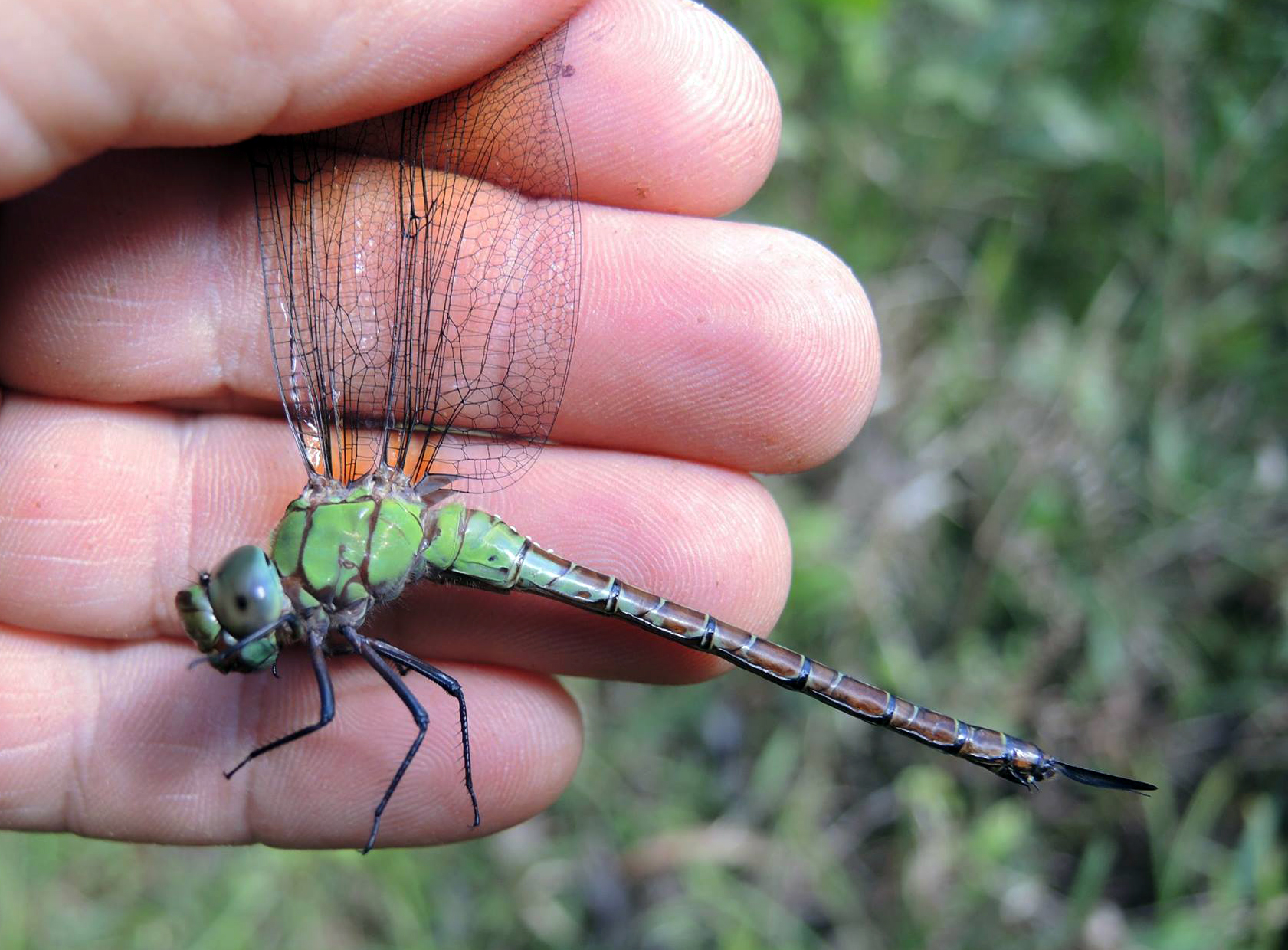
female

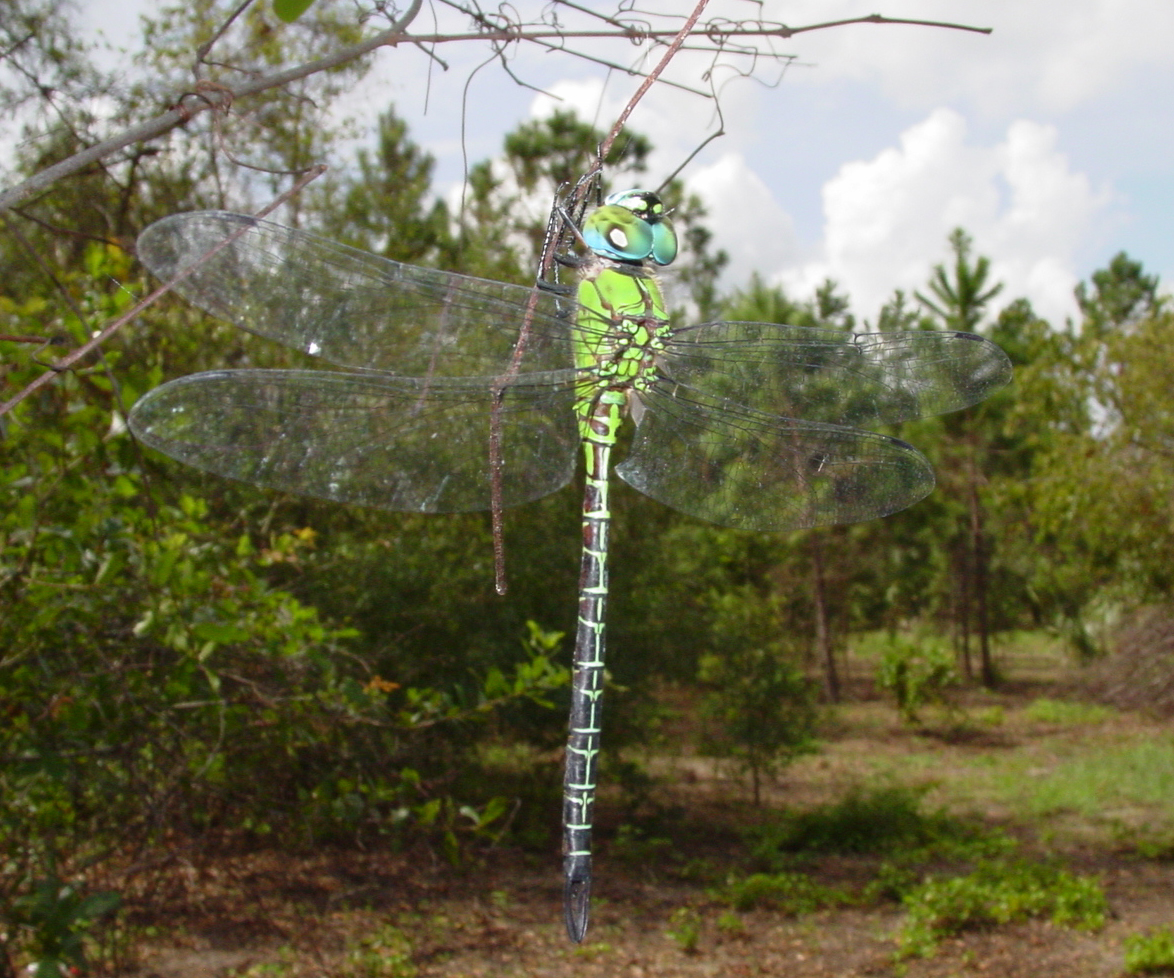

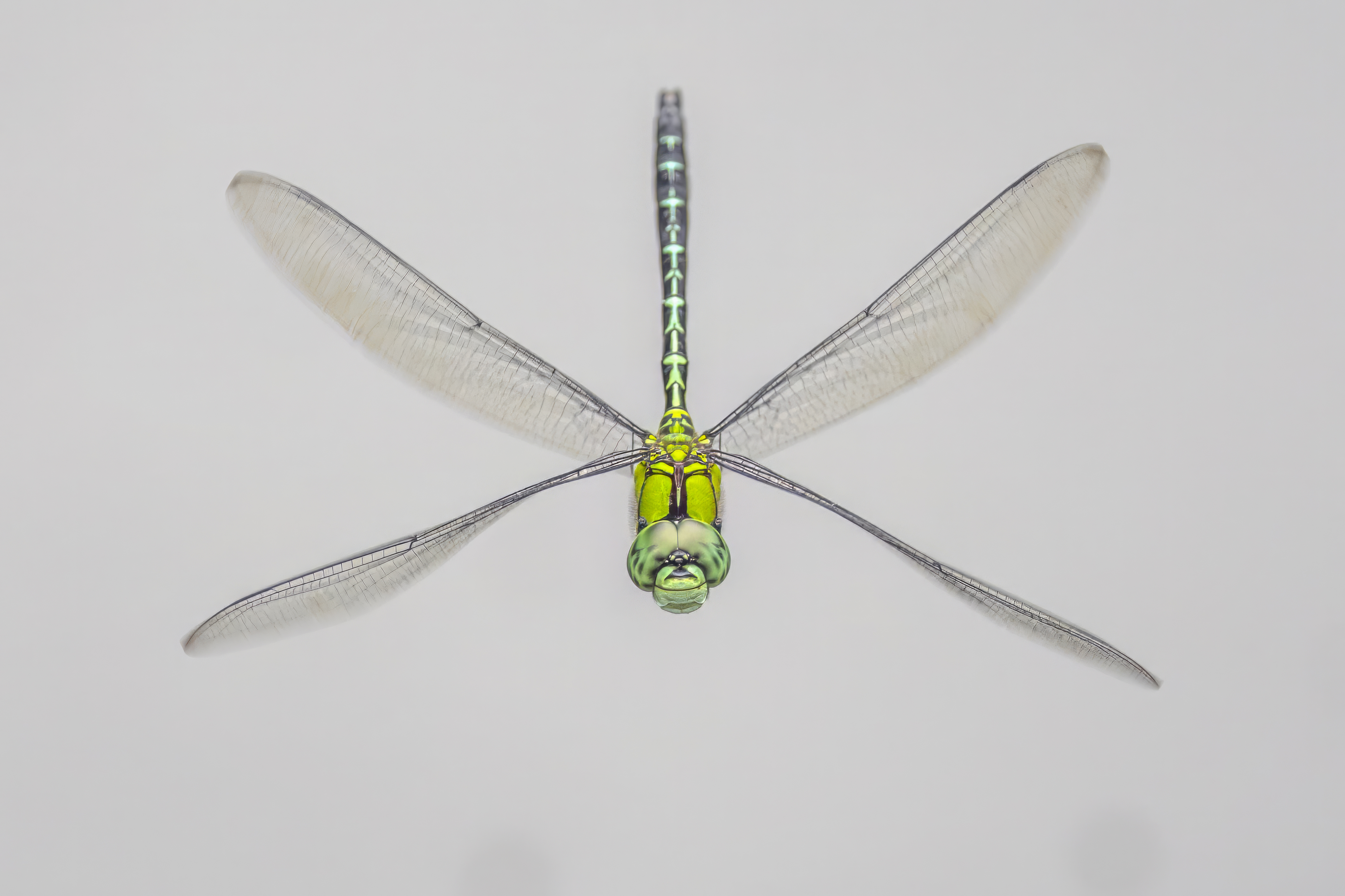
male
