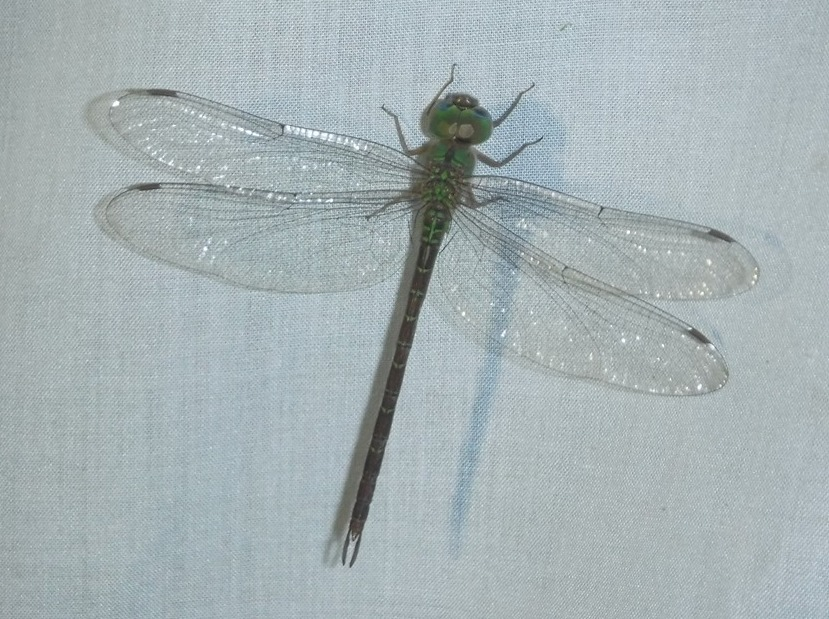

Scientific classification
- Kingdom: Animalia
- Phylum: Arthropoda
- Clade: Pancrustacea
- Class: Insecta
- Order: Odonata
- Infraorder: Anisoptera
- Family: Aeshnidae
- Genus: Triacanthagyna
- Species: T. septima

Binomial name
- Triacanthagyna septima (Selys in Sagra, 1857)

= Triacanthagyna septima =

Species of dragonfly

Triacanthagyna septima, the pale green darner, is a species of dragonfly in the family Aeshnidae. It is found in southern Texas.

== Description ==
Triacanthagyna septima is a relatively small darner growing to a total length of 59 to 66 mm (2.3 to 2.6 in) with a wingspan of 68 to 86 mm (2.7 to 3.4 in). The head of the male is olive and the eyes bluish-green. The thorax is pale green with a brownish wash on the front and the legs are pale. The abdomen is mostly brown, segments 1 and 2 having greenish sides and a slender greenish dorsal stripe. The female is very similar in coloration to the male but has greenish-brown eyes and has three long, slender cerci (appendages) on the last segment. These may break off in mature individuals which then closely resemble males.
