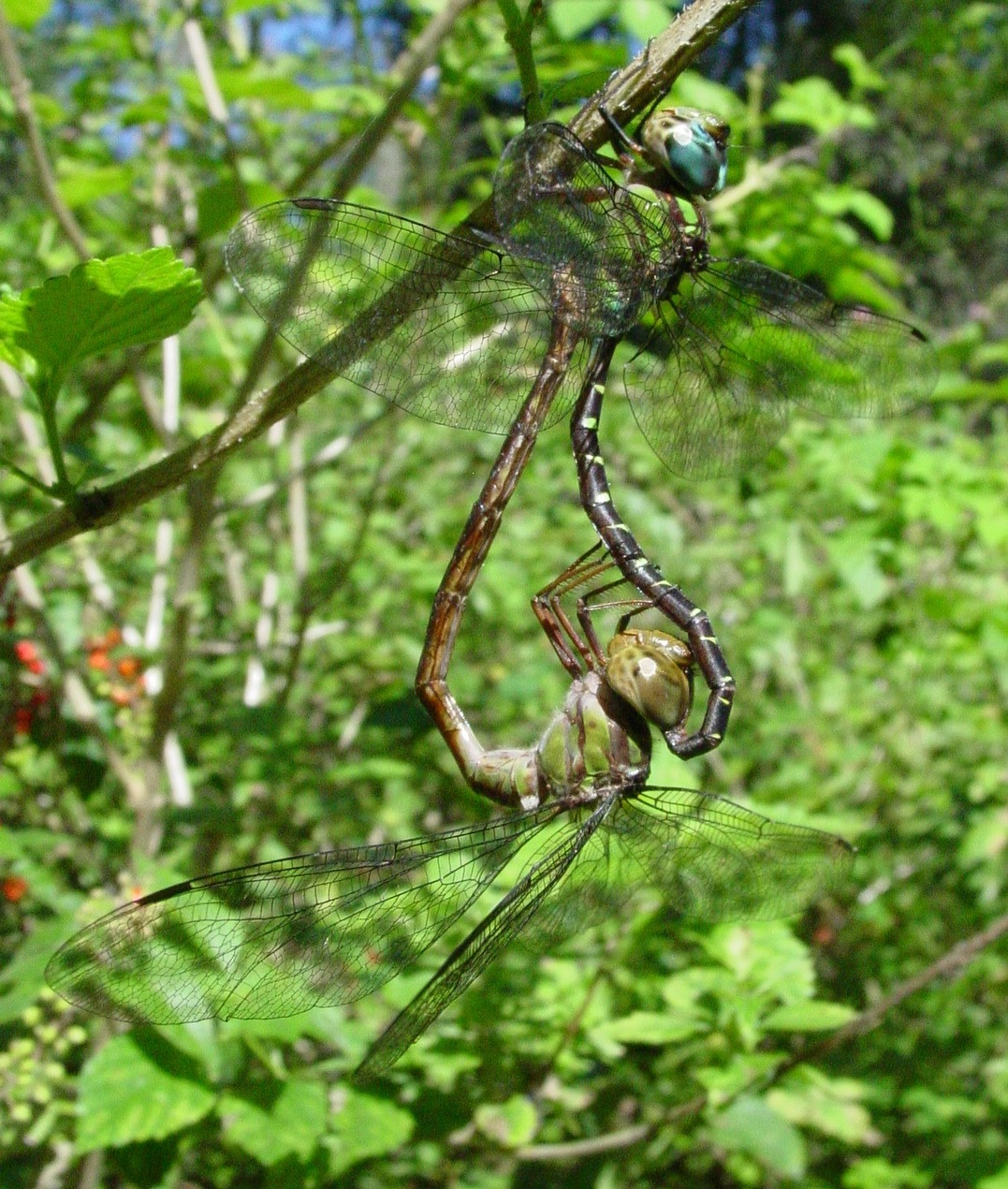

Scientific classification
- Kingdom: Animalia
- Phylum: Arthropoda
- Clade: Pancrustacea
- Class: Insecta
- Order: Odonata
- Infraorder: Anisoptera
- Family: Aeshnidae
- Genus: Triacanthagyna; Selys, 1883

= Triacanthagyna =

Genus of dragonflies

Triacanthagyna is a genus of dragonflies in the family Aeshnidae from the Americas. The species have large eyes and broad wings. The females have three prominent spines under the last abdominal segment which gives the genus its name. They are commonly known as three-spined darners.

The genus contains the following species:

- Triacanthagyna caribbea Williamson, 1923 - Caribbean Darner
- Triacanthagyna dentata (Geijskes, 1943)
- Triacanthagyna ditzleri Williamson, 1923
- Triacanthagyna nympha (Navás, 1933)
- Triacanthagyna obscuripennis (Blanchard, 1847)
- Triacanthagyna satyrus (Martin, 1909)
- Triacanthagyna septima (Selys in Sagra, 1857) - Pale-green Darner
- Triacanthagyna trifida (Rambur, 1842) - Phantom Darner
- Triacanthagyna williamsoni von Ellenrieder & Garrison, 2003
