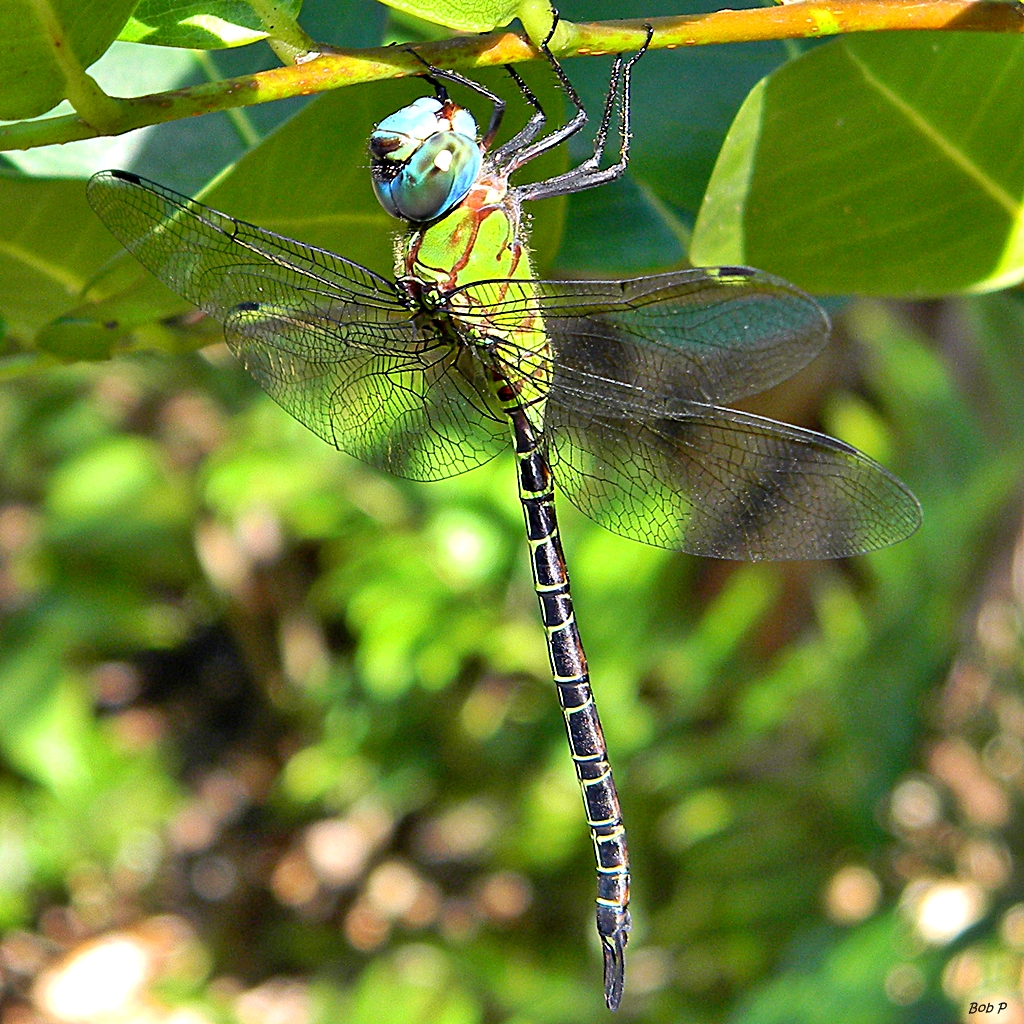
- Coryphaeschna adnexa

Scientific classification
- Domain: Eukaryota
- Kingdom: Animalia
- Phylum: Arthropoda
- Class: Insecta
- Order: Odonata
- Infraorder: Anisoptera
- Family: Aeshnidae
- Genus: Coryphaeschna; Williamson, 1903

= Coryphaeschna =

Genus of dragonflies

Coryphaeschna is a genus of pilot darners in the dragonfly family Aeshnidae. There are about 10 described species in Coryphaeschna.

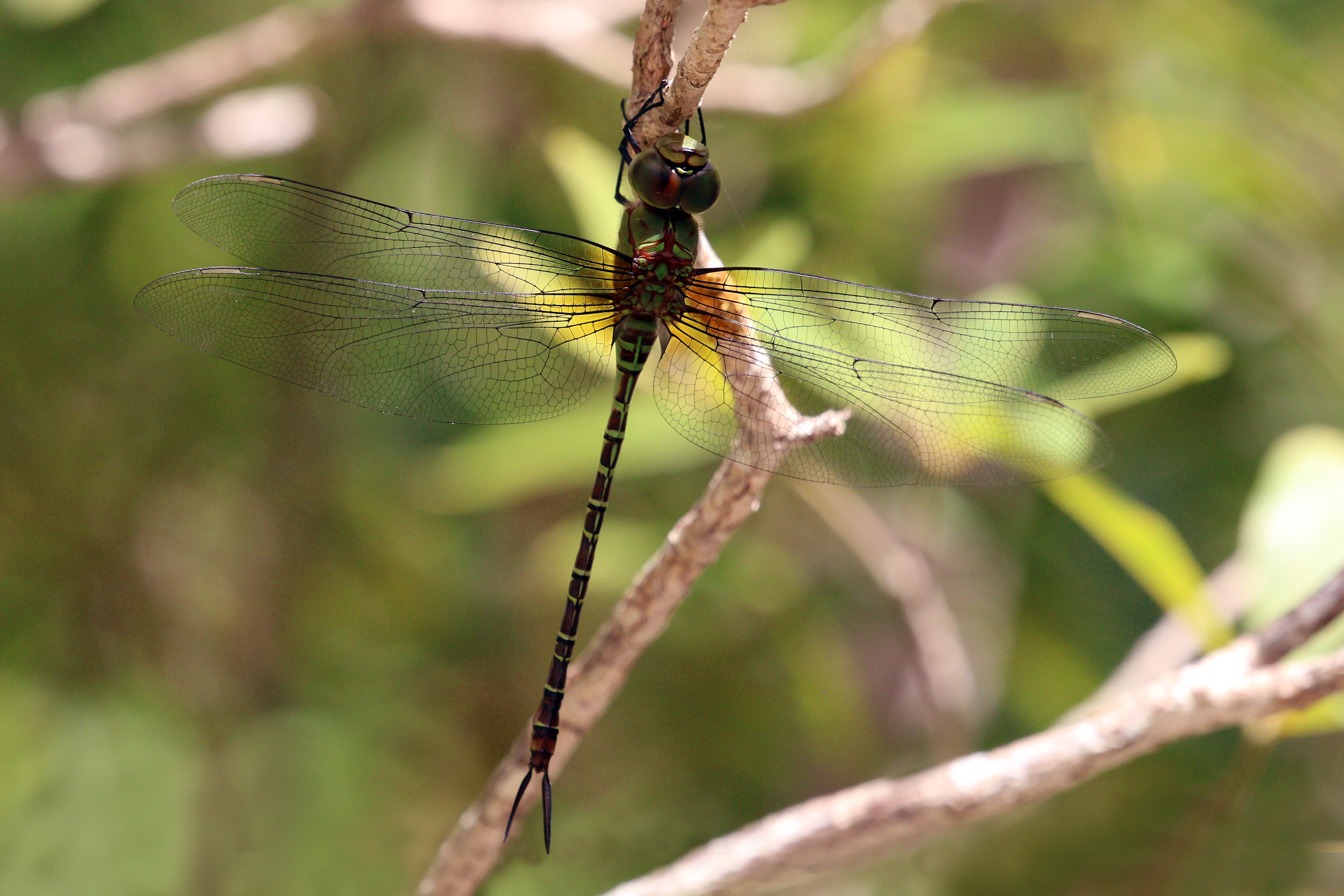
Coryphaeschna viriditas

== Species ==
These 10 species belong to the genus Coryphaeschna:

- Coryphaeschna adnexa (Hagen, 1861) (blue-faced darner)
- Coryphaeschna amazonica De Marmels, 1989
- Coryphaeschna apeora Paulson, 1994
- Coryphaeschna diapyra Paulson, 1994
- Coryphaeschna huaorania Tennessen, 2001
- Coryphaeschna ingens (Rambur, 1842) (regal darner)
- Coryphaeschna longfieldae Kimmins
- Coryphaeschna perrensi (McLachlan, 1887)
- Coryphaeschna secreta Calvert
- Coryphaeschna viriditas Calvert, 1952 (mangrove darner)
