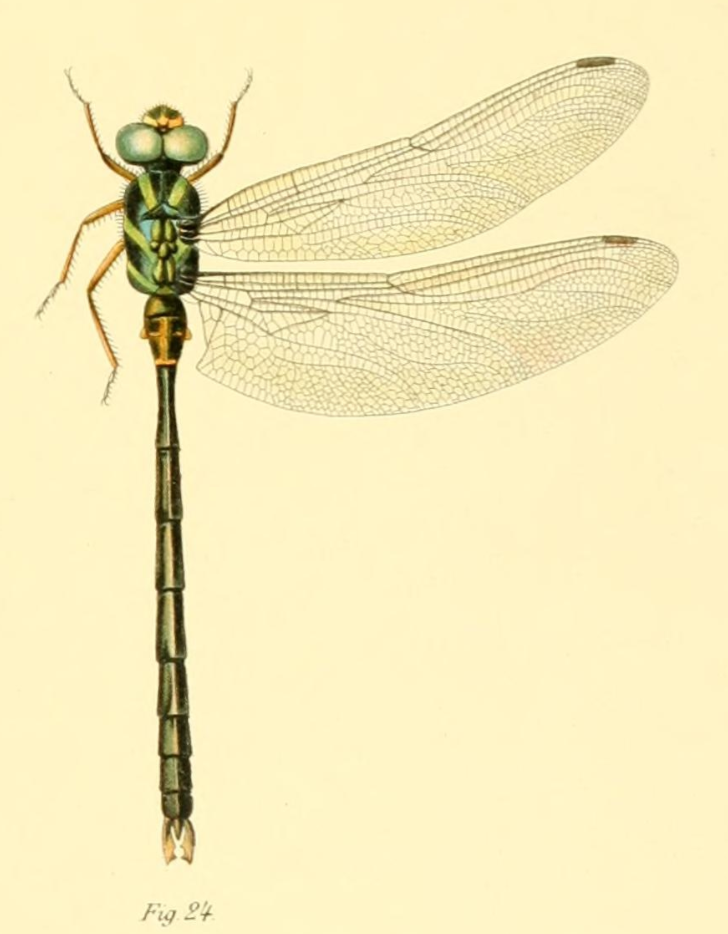
- N. claviforcipata ♂.

Scientific classification
- Kingdom: Animalia
- Phylum: Arthropoda
- Clade: Pancrustacea
- Class: Insecta
- Order: Odonata
- Infraorder: Anisoptera
- Family: Aeshnidae
- Genus: Neuraeschna; Hagen, 1867

Type species
- Aeschna costalis Burmeister, 1839

Species
- Neuraeschna calverti Kimmins, 1951; Neuraeschna capillata Machet, 1990; Neuraeschna claviforcipata Martin, 1909; Neuraeschna clavulata Machet, 1990; Neuraeschna cornuta Belle, 1989; Neuraeschna costalis (Burmeister, 1839); Neuraeschna dentigera Martin, 1909; Neuraeschna harpya Martin, 1909; Neuraeschna maxima Belle, 1989; Neuraeschna maya Belle, 1989; Neuraeschna mayoruna Belle, 1989; Neuraeschna mina Williamson and Williamson, 1930; Neuraeschna producta Kimmins, 1933; Neuraeschna tapajonica Machado, 2002; Neuraeschna titania Belle, 1989

= Neuraeschna =

Genus of dragonflies

Neuraeschna is a genus of dragonflies in the family Aeshnidae. Its species are found from Peru and Brazil up through Honduras.

== Species ==
Neuraeschna has fifteen species:

- Neuraeschna calverti Kimmins, 1951
- Neuraeschna capillata Machet, 1990
- Neuraeschna claviforcipata Martin, 1909
- Neuraeschna clavulata Machet, 1990
- Neuraeschna cornuta Belle, 1989
- Neuraeschna costalis (Burmeister, 1839)
  - syn. N. ferox (Erichson, 1848)
- Neuraeschna dentigera Martin, 1909
  - syn. N. inarmata Kimmins, 1951
- Neuraeschna harpya Martin, 1909
- Neuraeschna maxima Belle, 1989
- Neuraeschna maya Belle, 1989
- Neuraeschna mayoruna Belle, 1989
- Neuraeschna mina Williamson and Williamson, 1930
- Neuraeschna producta Kimmins, 1933
- Neuraeschna tapajonica Machado, 2002
- Neuraeschna titania Belle, 1989
