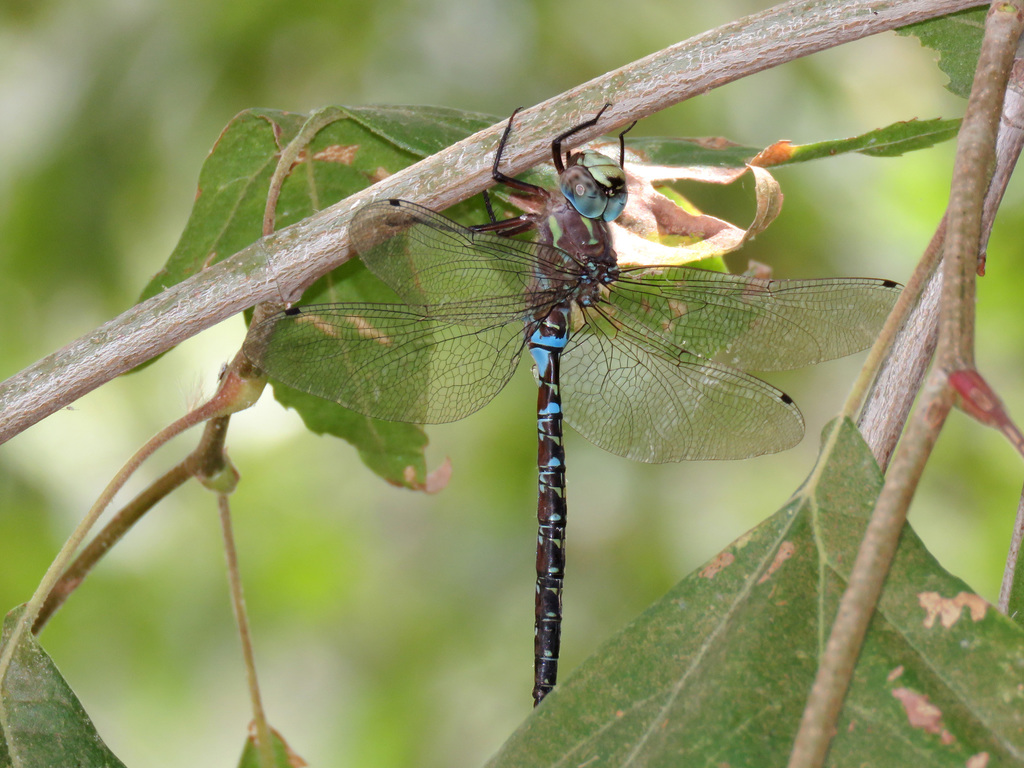
- Oplonaeschna armata

Scientific classification
- Kingdom: Animalia
- Phylum: Arthropoda
- Clade: Pancrustacea
- Class: Insecta
- Order: Odonata
- Infraorder: Anisoptera
- Family: Aeshnidae
- Genus: Oplonaeschna; Selys, 1883

= Oplonaeschna =

Genus of dragonflies

Oplonaeschna is a genus of riffle darners in the dragonfly family Aeshnidae. There are about five described species in Oplonaeschna.

== Species ==
These five species belong to the genus Oplonaeschna:

- Oplonaeschna armata (Hagen, 1861) (riffle darner)
- Oplonaeschna magna González & Novelo, 1998
- † Oplonaeschna lapidaria Cockerell & Counts
- † Aeschna metis (Heer, 1849)
- † Oplonaeschna staurophlebioides Henriksen, 1922
