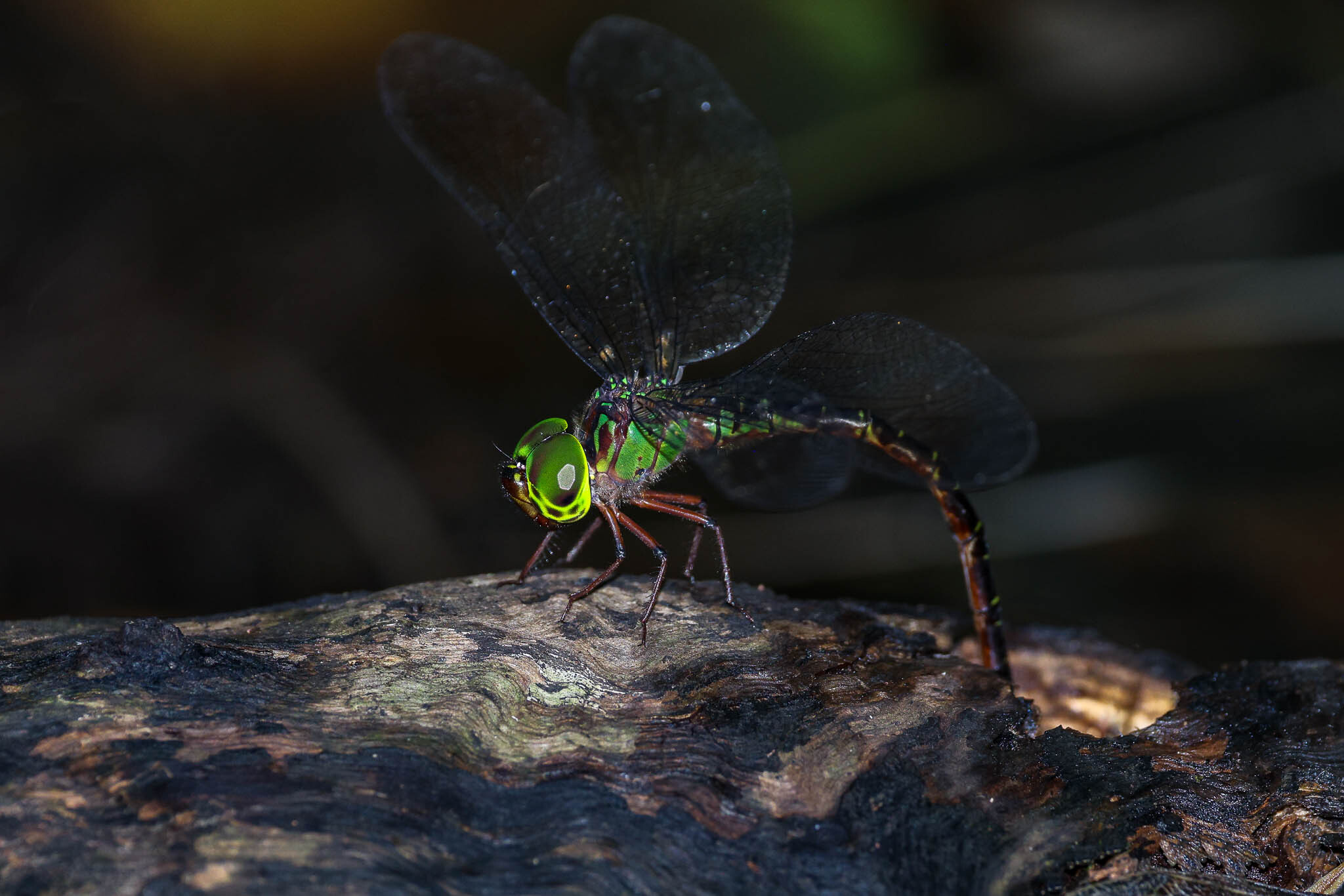
- Female ovipositing

Scientific classification
- Kingdom: Animalia
- Phylum: Arthropoda
- Clade: Pancrustacea
- Class: Insecta
- Order: Odonata
- Infraorder: Anisoptera
- Family: Aeshnidae
- Genus: Agyrtacantha; Lieftinck, 1937

= Agyrtacantha =

Genus of dragonflies

Agyrtacantha is a genus of dragonflies in the family Aeshnidae. Species of Agyrtacantha can be large, dull-coloured dragonflies.

== Species ==
The genus Agyrtacantha includes the following species:

- Agyrtacantha browni Marinov & Theischinger, 2012
- Agyrtacantha dirupta (Karsch, 1889) – trifid dusthawker
- Agyrtacantha microstigma (Selys, 1878)
- Agyrtacantha othello Lieftinck, 1942
- Agyrtacantha picta Theischinger & Richards, 2019
- Agyrtacantha tumidula Lieftinck, 1937

== Etymology ==
The genus name Agyrtacantha combines the Greek ἀγύρτης (agyrtēs, "imposter" or "charlatan"), referring to confusion surrounding its earlier classification, with ἄκανθα (akantha, "thorn" or "spine"), referring to the spines at the tip of the female abdomen.
