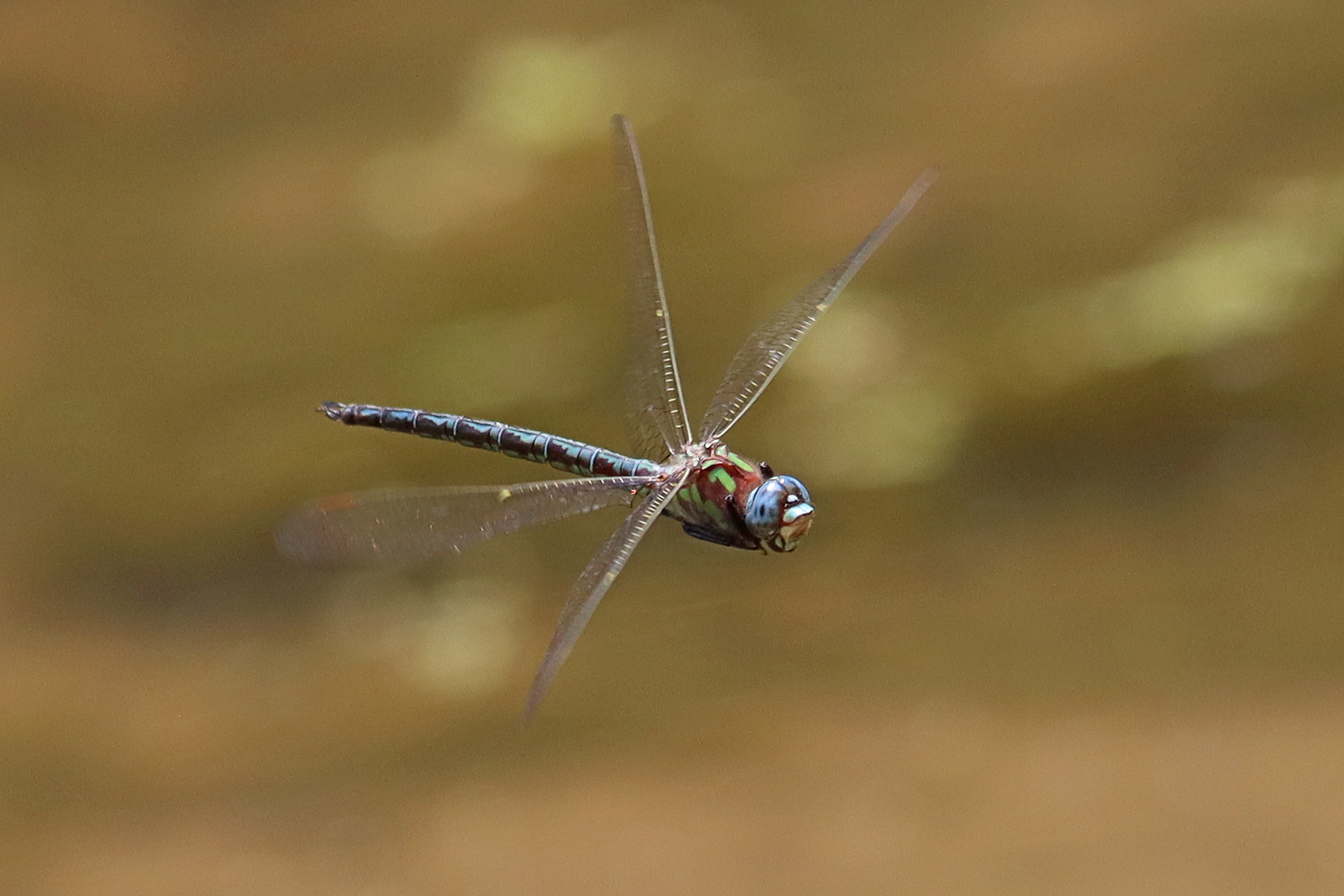

Conservation status
- Least Concern (IUCN 3.1)

Scientific classification
- Kingdom: Animalia
- Phylum: Arthropoda
- Clade: Pancrustacea
- Class: Insecta
- Order: Odonata
- Suborder: Anisoptera
- Family: Aeshnidae
- Genus: Nasiaeschna; Selys in Förster, 1900
- Species: N. pentacantha

Binomial name
- Nasiaeschna pentacantha (Rambur, 1842)

= Nasiaeschna =

Nasiaeschna Temporal range: Late Miocene to present

Genus of dragonflies

Nasiaeschna pentacantha, the Cyrano darner, is a species of dragonfly in the family Aeshnidae, and the only extant species in the genus Nasiaeschna. It is native to eastern North America. A single fossil species, †Nasiaeschna miocenica Claisse, Brisac & Nel, 2019, is known from the Late Miocene of France, suggesting they persisted in Europe up until relatively recently.

== Description ==
The cyrano darner is a stocky greenish dragonfly. It has blue eyes and a large, projecting frons. The thorax is brown with characteristic green stripes on the front and sides. The abdomen has longitudinal brown and green stripes and tapers along its length.

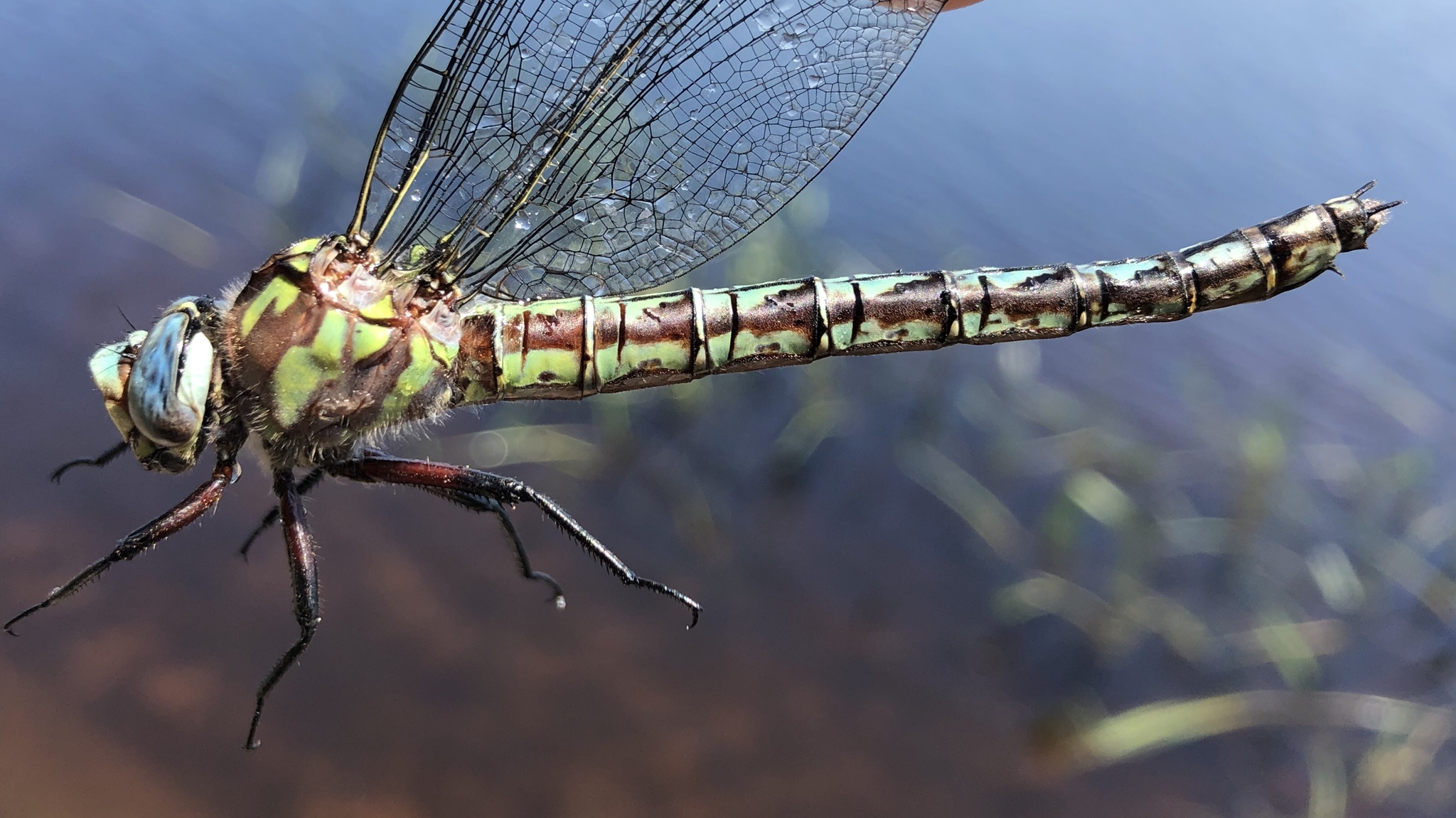
Lateral view

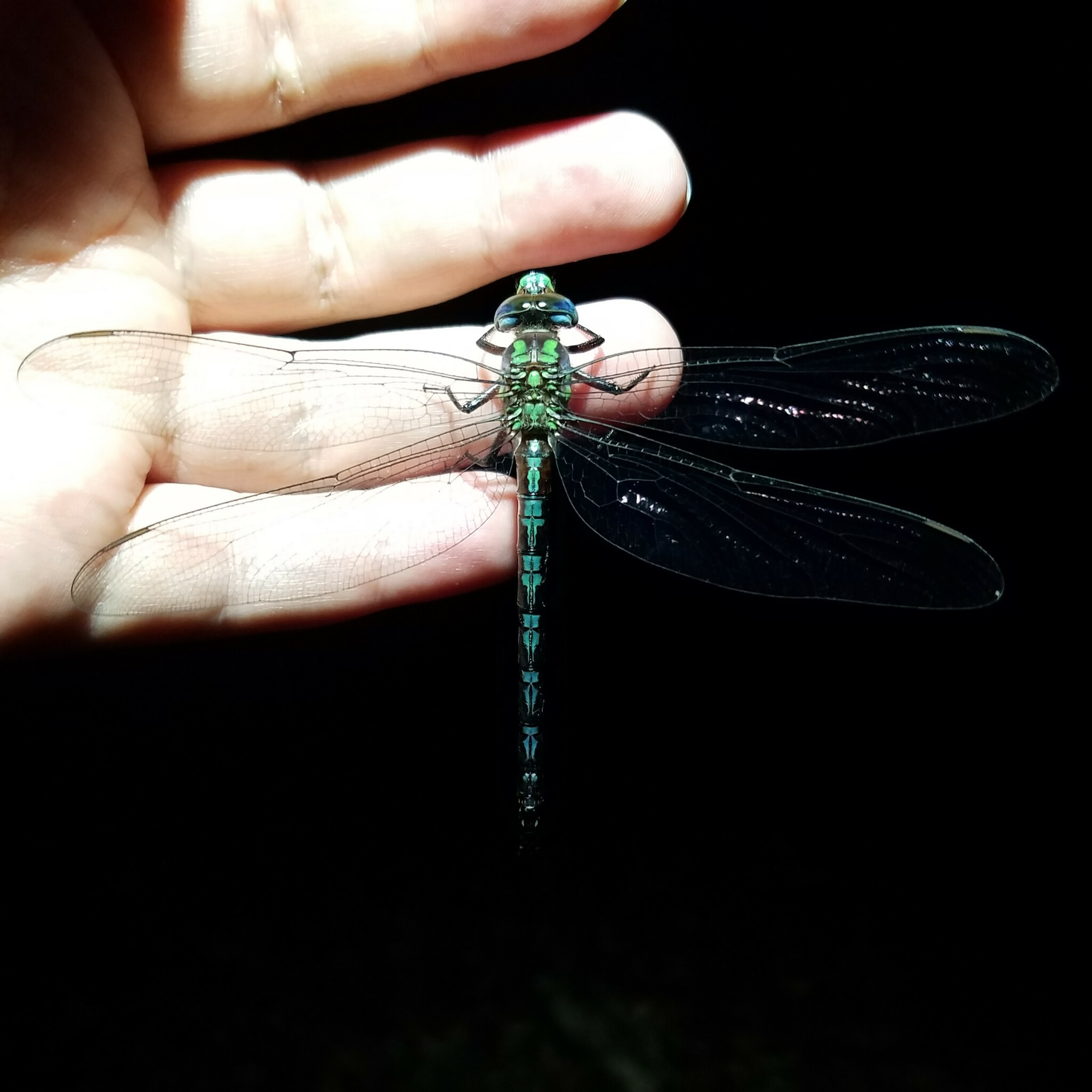
Dorsal view

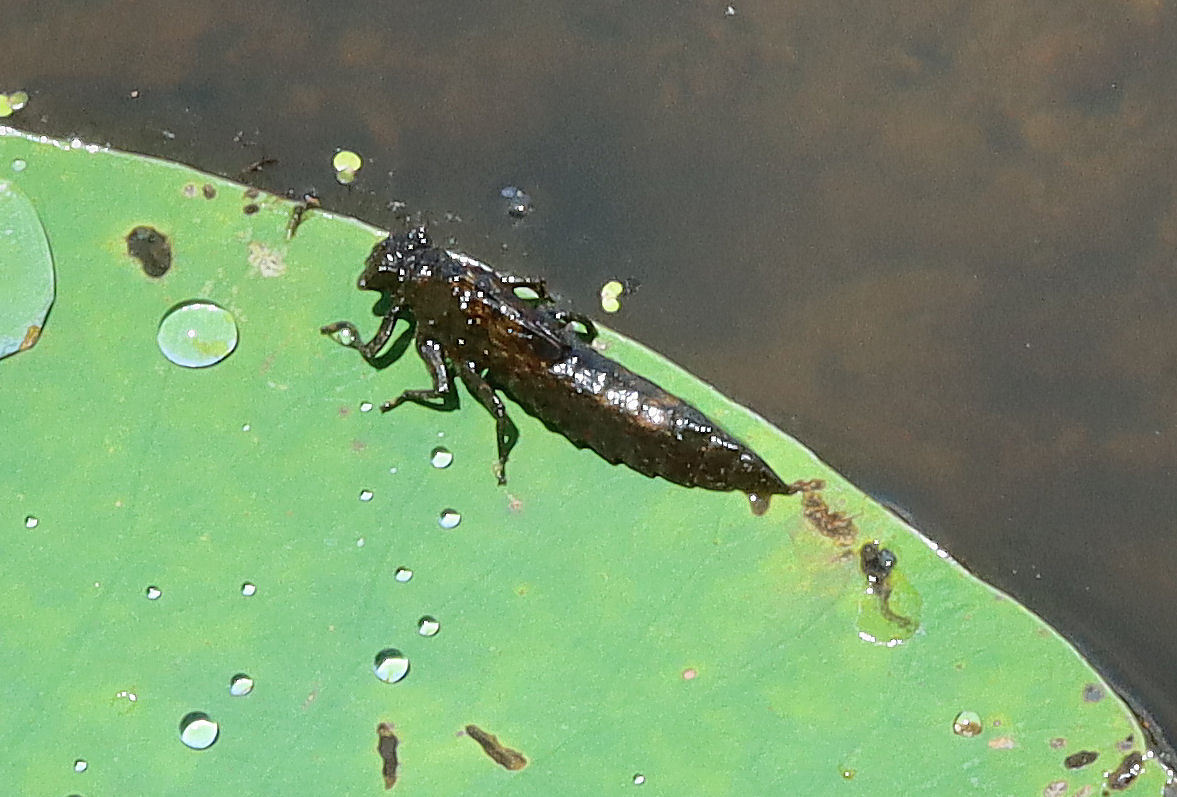
Nymph

Nymph development spans 15 instars, reaching a length of approximately 40 millimetres (1.6 in). Nymphs are mostly dark brown, with some abdominal segments paler. Nasiaeschna pentacantha eggs are pale yellow, measuring approximately 0.3 millimetres (0.012 in) by 1.5 millimetres (0.059 in).

== Etymology ==
The genus name Nasiaeschna is the combination of "nose" and Aeshna, referring to the projection of the frons in this species. The specific epithet pentacantha ("five-spined") refers to the patches of spines under the tip of the female's abdomen.

The common name "cyrano darner" is similarly based on the facial projection, alluding to the large nose of Cyrano de Bergerac.

== Behavior ==
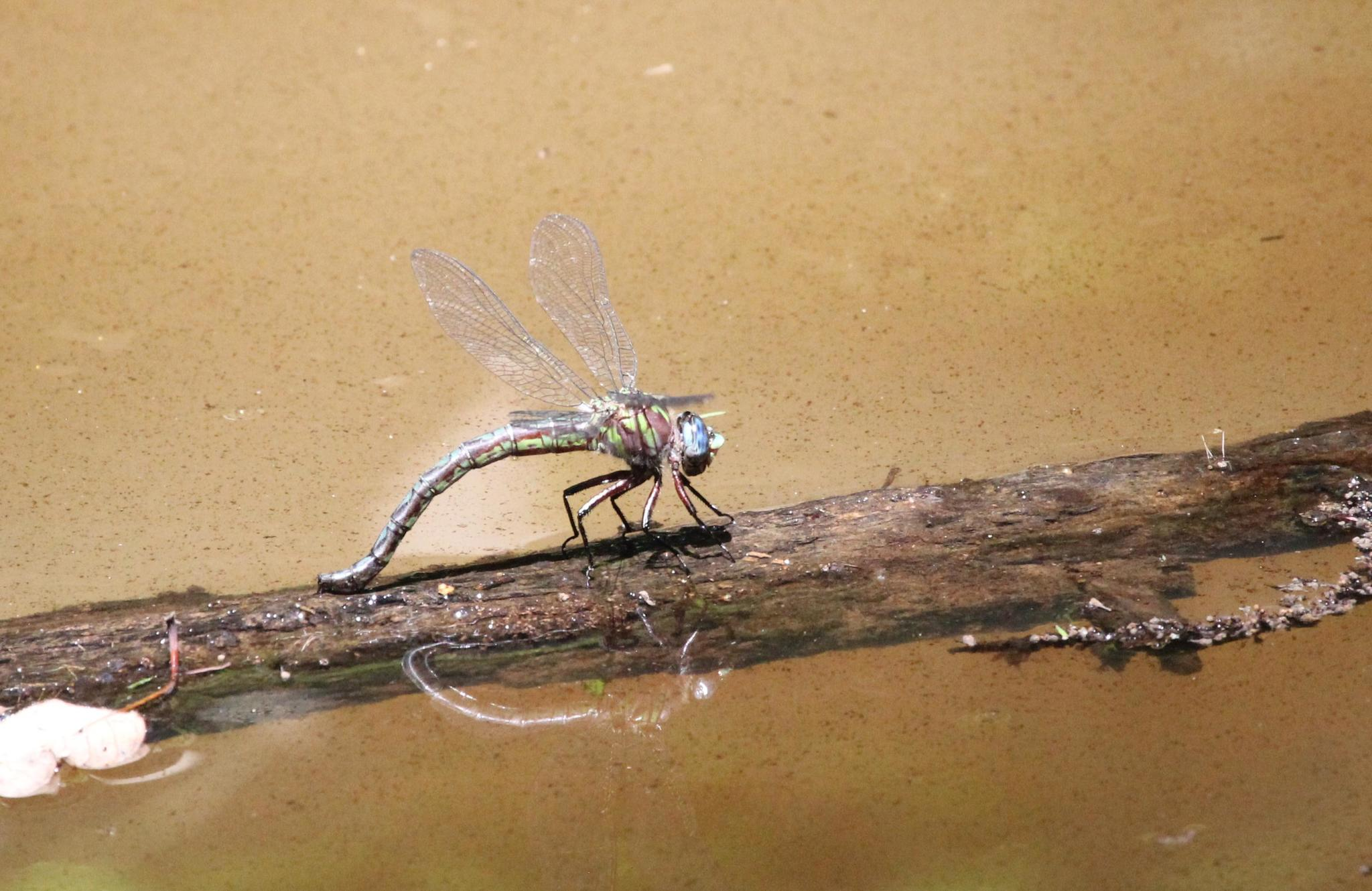
A cyrano darner ovipositing.

The cyrano darner flies regular beats about waist- to head-height over open water or forest clearings with wings continuously fluttering. The abdomen is often slightly arched in flight. They pluck prey (including other Odonates) from vegetation and carry it to a perch to eat.

Females oviposit on sodden logs or stumps at the water's edge. This species is documented to complete one generation every year.

This species is quite territorial, making it unusual to see more than one at a time.

== Distribution ==
The cyrano darner is found throughout the eastern United States and southeastern Canada.

== Habitat ==
The cyrano darner inhabits standing and slow-moving water such as swampy pools, forested ponds, and canals. A wooded or shrubby border around the water may be necessary.
