= Oligoaeschna =

Scientific classification
- Kingdom: Animalia
- Phylum: Arthropoda
- Class: Insecta
- Order: Odonata
- Infraorder: Anisoptera
- Family: Aeshnidae
- Genus: Oligoaeschna; Selys, 1889

Genus of dragonflies

Oligoaeschna is a genus of dragonfly in the family Aeshnidae. It contains the following species:

- Oligoaeschna amata (Förster, 1903)
- Oligoaeschna amani Chhotani, Lahiri & Mitra, 1983
- Oligoaeschna aquilonaris Wilson, 2005
- Oligoaeschna buehri (Förster, 1903)
- Oligoaeschna elacatura (Needham, 1907)
- Oligoaeschna foliacea Lieftinck, 1968)
- Oligoaeschna modiglianii Selys, 1889
- Oligoaeschna mutata Lieftinck, 1940
- Oligoaeschna petalura Lieftinck, 1968
- Oligoaeschna platyura Lieftinck, 1940
- Oligoaeschna poeciloptera (Karsch, 1889)
- Oligoaeschna pseudosumatrana Karube, 1997
- Oligoaeschna sumatrana Lieftinck, 1953
- Oligoaeschna uemurai Asahina, 1990
- Oligoaeschna uropetala Lieftinck, 1968
- Oligoaeschna venatrix (Förster, 1903)
- Oligoaeschna venusta Lieftinck, 1968
- Oligoaeschna zambo Needham & Gyger, 1937
