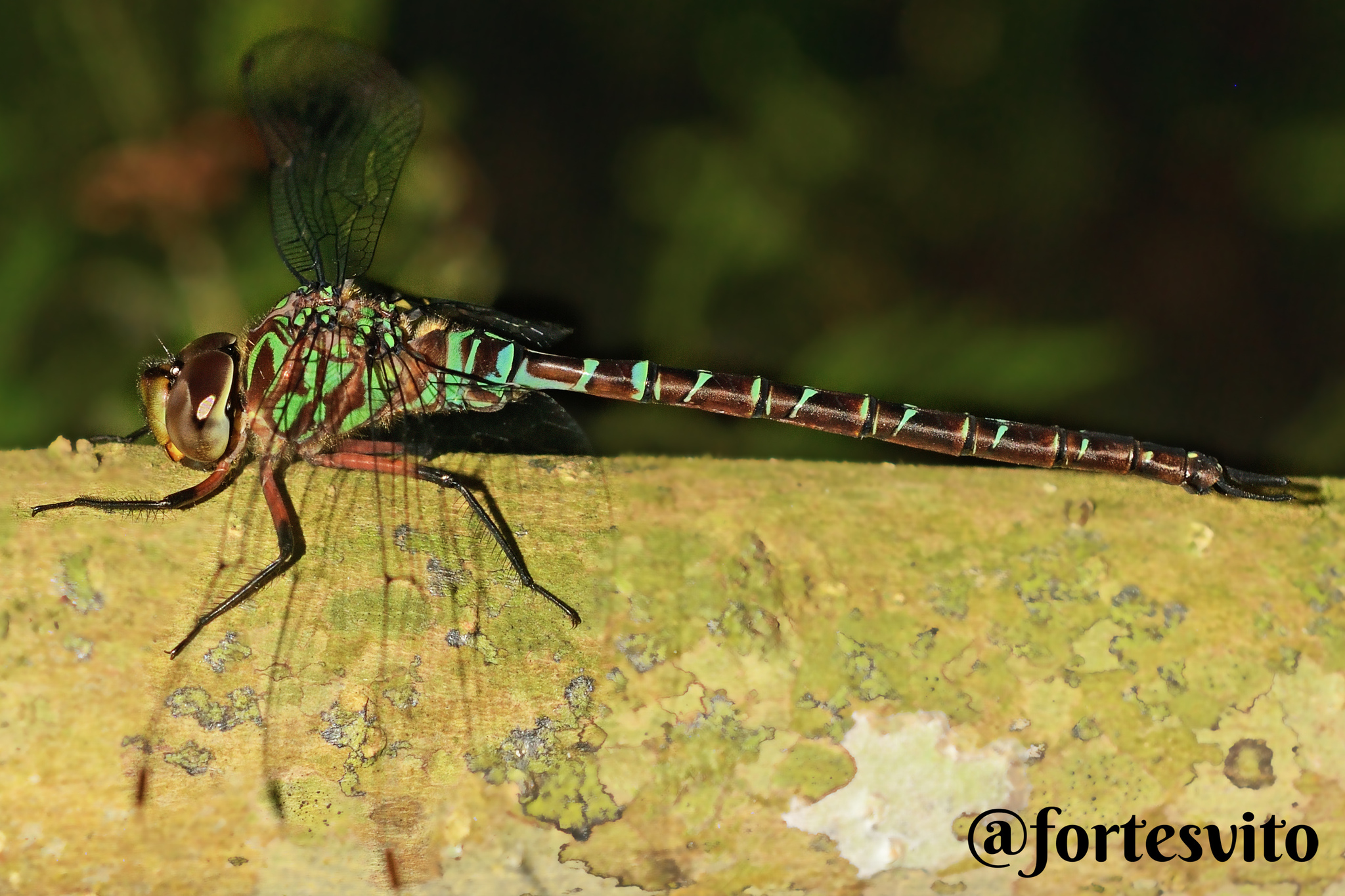
- L. antarcticum (Male; Brazil)

Scientific classification
- Kingdom: Animalia
- Phylum: Arthropoda
- Clade: Pancrustacea
- Class: Insecta
- Order: Odonata
- Infraorder: Anisoptera
- Family: Aeshnidae
- Genus: Limnetron; Förster, 1907

Type species
- Limnetron antarcticum Förster, 1907

Species
- Limnetron antarcticum Förster, 1907; Limnetron debile (Karsch, 1891)

= Limnetron =

Genus of dragonflies

Limnetron is a genus of dragonflies in the family Aeshnidae. It consists of two species: Limnetron antarcticum Förster, 1907, and Limnetron debile (Karsch, 1891), though some experts speculate that there are additional, undiscovered species. They are found in forest streams in Paraguay, south-eastern Brazil, northern Argentina, and Peru.
