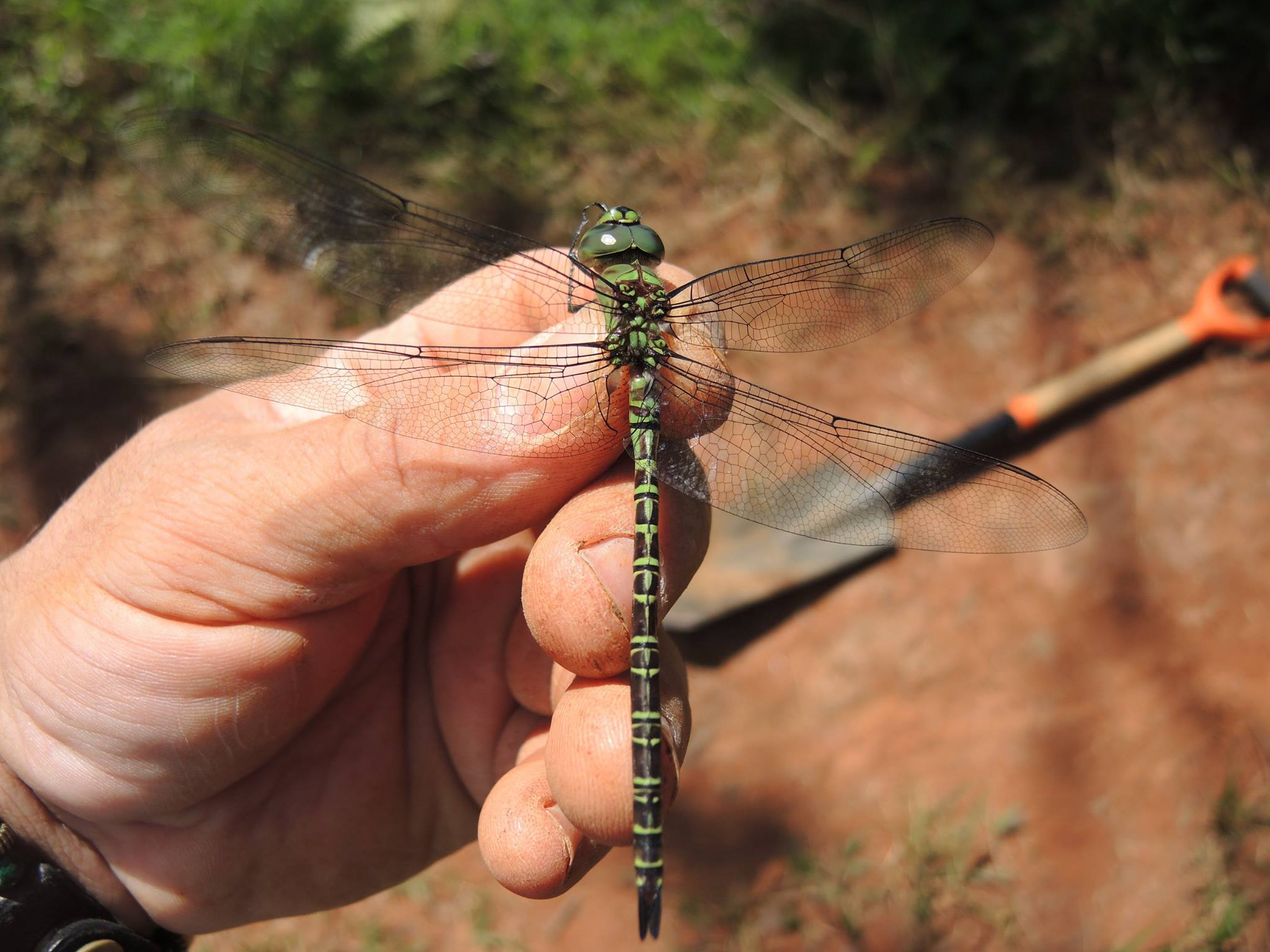

Conservation status
- Least Concern (IUCN 3.1)

Scientific classification
- Domain: Eukaryota
- Kingdom: Animalia
- Phylum: Arthropoda
- Class: Insecta
- Order: Odonata
- Infraorder: Anisoptera
- Family: Aeshnidae
- Genus: Coryphaeschna
- Species: C. viriditas

Binomial name
- Coryphaeschna viriditas Calvert, 1952

= Coryphaeschna viriditas =

Species of dragonfly

Coryphaeschna viriditas, the mangrove darner, is a species of darner in the family Aeshnidae. It is found in the Caribbean, Central America, North America, and South America.

The IUCN conservation status of Coryphaeschna viriditas is "LC", least concern, with no immediate threat to the species' survival. The population is stable.

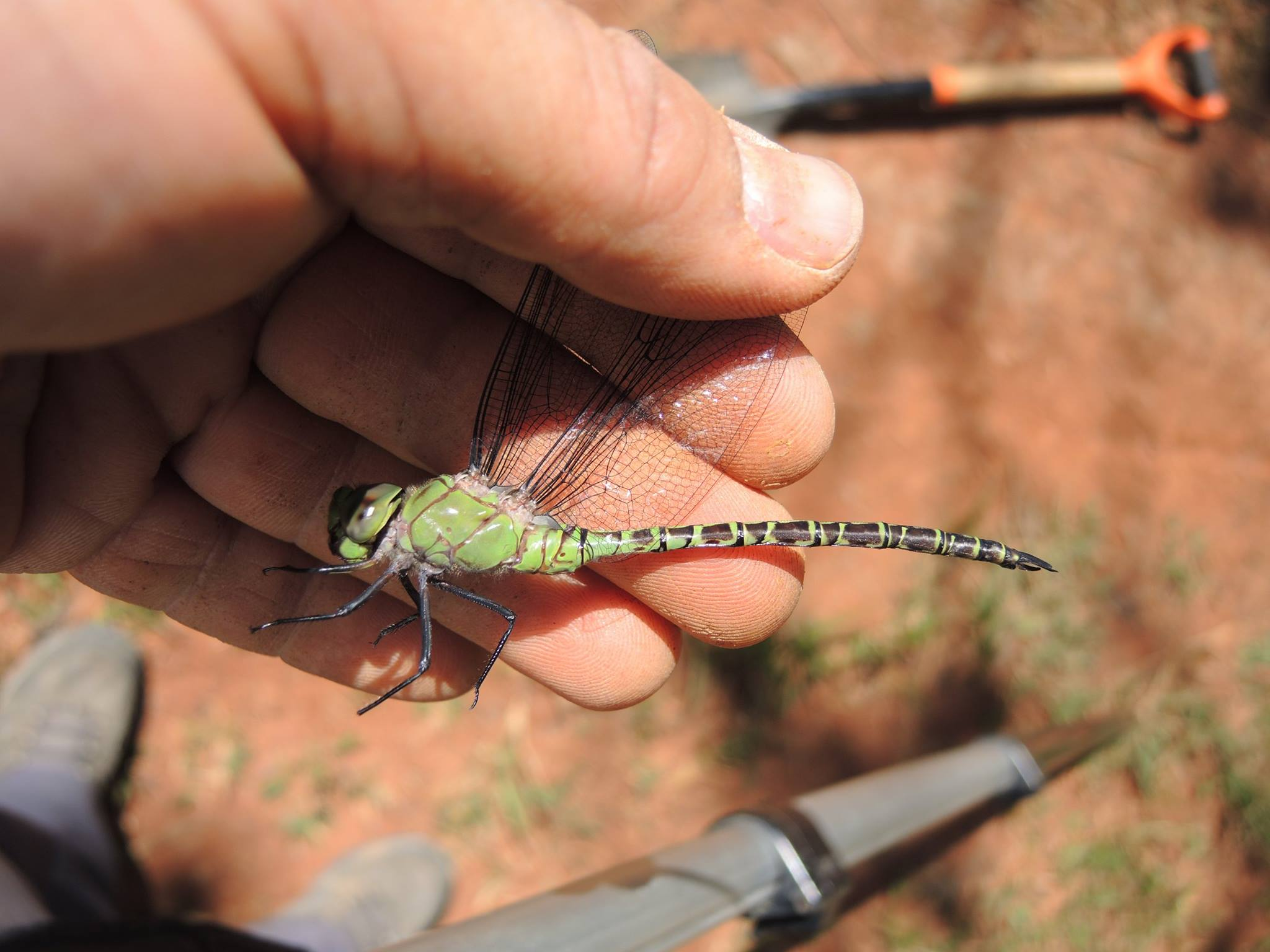
mangrove darner, Coryphaeschna viriditas

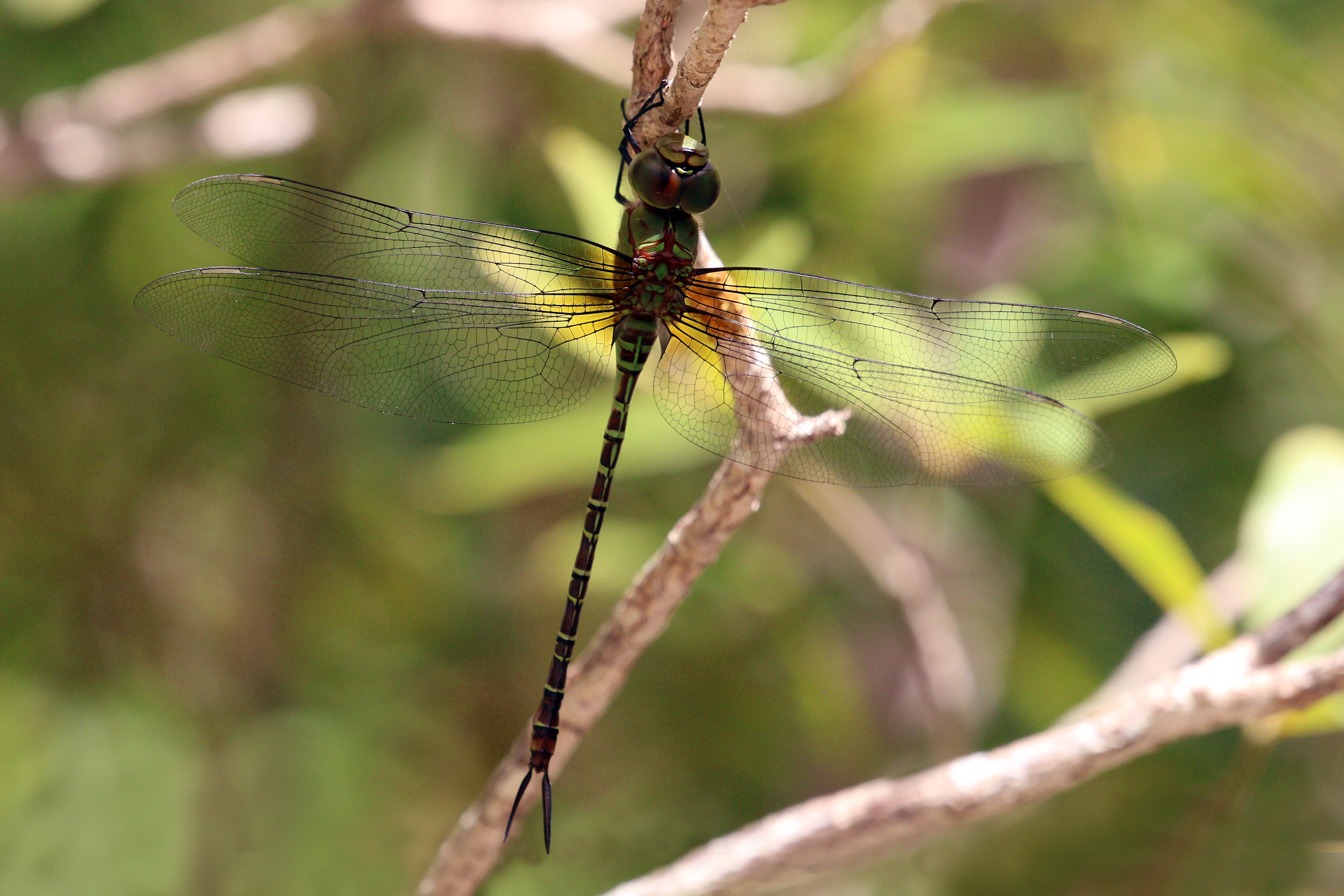
mangrove darner, Coryphaeschna viriditas
