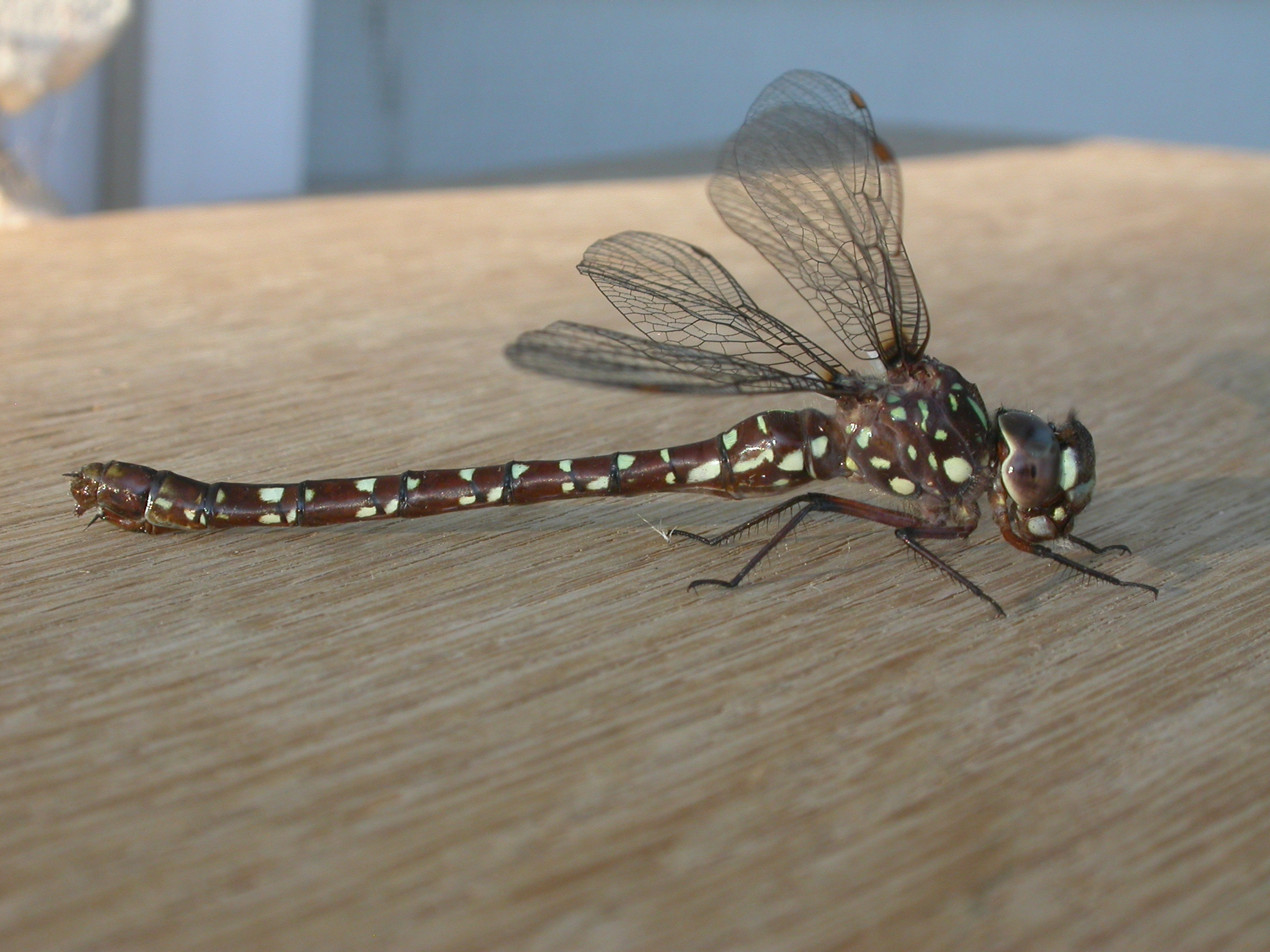
- Female Dendroaeschna conspersa Canberra Australia

Conservation status
- Least Concern (IUCN 3.1)

Scientific classification
- Kingdom: Animalia
- Phylum: Arthropoda
- Clade: Pancrustacea
- Class: Insecta
- Order: Odonata
- Suborder: Anisoptera
- Family: Aeshnidae
- Genus: Dendroaeschna; Tillyard, 1916
- Species: D. conspersa

Binomial name
- Dendroaeschna conspersa (Tillyard, 1907)

Synonyms
- Caliaeschna conspersa Tillyard, 1907

= Dendroaeschna =

Wide-faced darner

Genus of dragonflies

Dendroaeschna is a monotypic genus of Australian dragonflies in the family Aeshnidae. The only known species of this genus is Dendroaeschna conspersa, commonly known as a wide-faced darner.

Dendroaeschna conspersa is a medium-sized, brown to black dragonfly with pale markings. It is endemic to eastern Australia, where it inhabits lowland streams.

== Etymology ==
The genus name Dendroaeschna is derived from the Greek δένδρον (dendron, "tree"), combined with -aeschna, a suffix commonly used for dragonflies associated with the Aeshna group. The name may refer to the tree-like pattern of venation in the wings.

The species name conspersa is derived from the Latin conspersus ("sprinkled with"), likely referring to the thorax and abdomen being marked with pea-green spots on a rich chocolate-brown background.

== Gallery ==
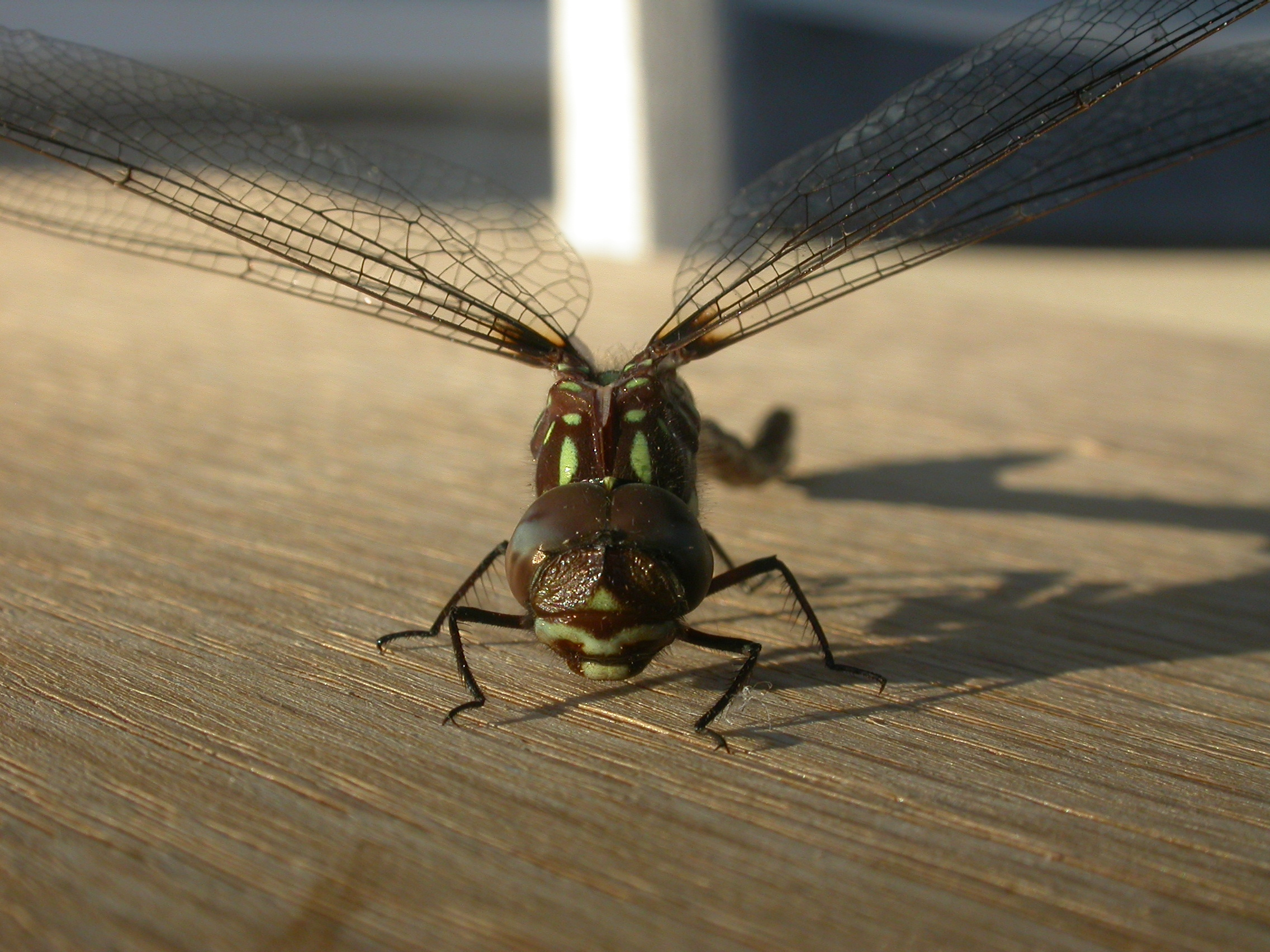
Female face on

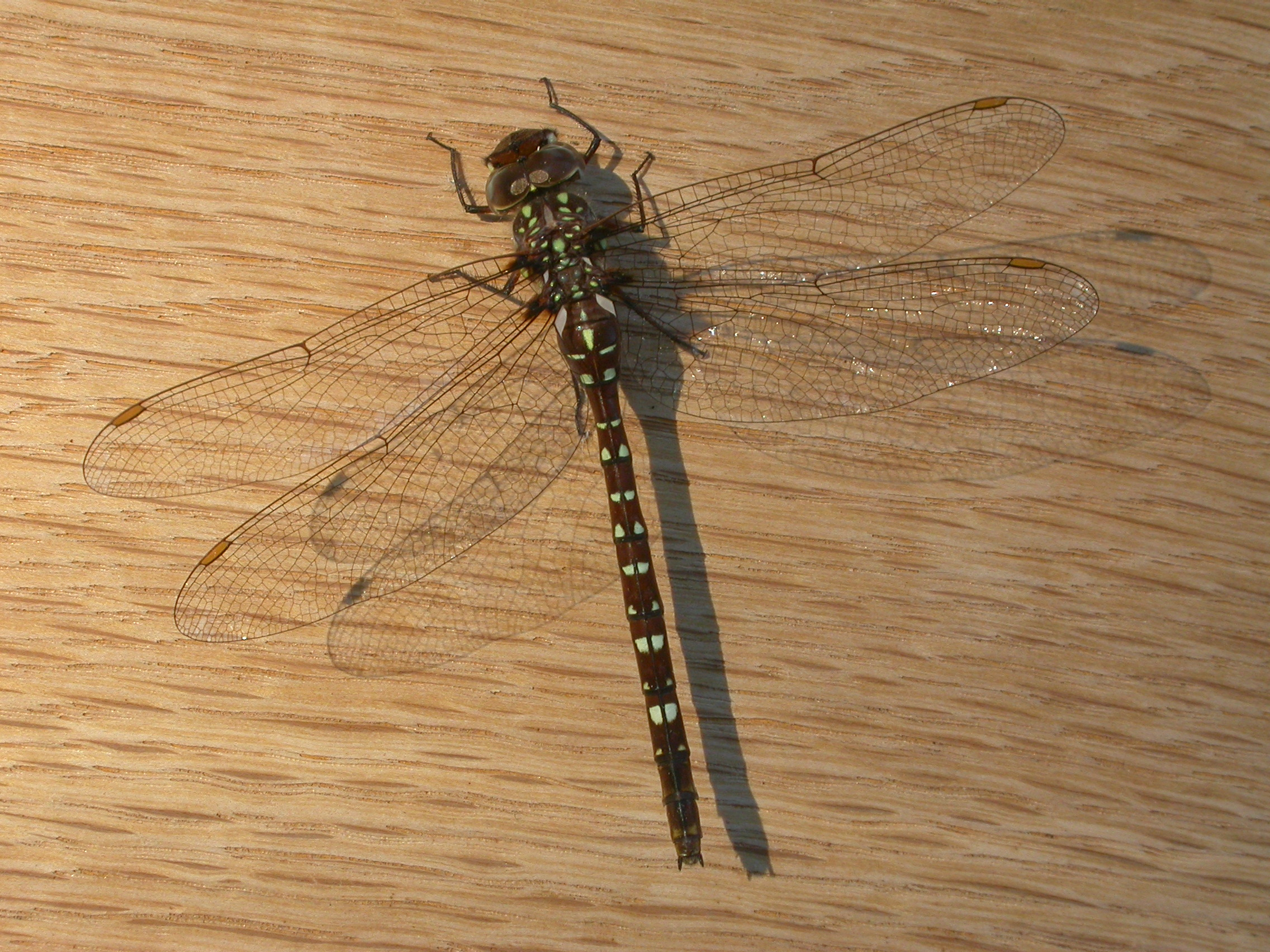
Female from above

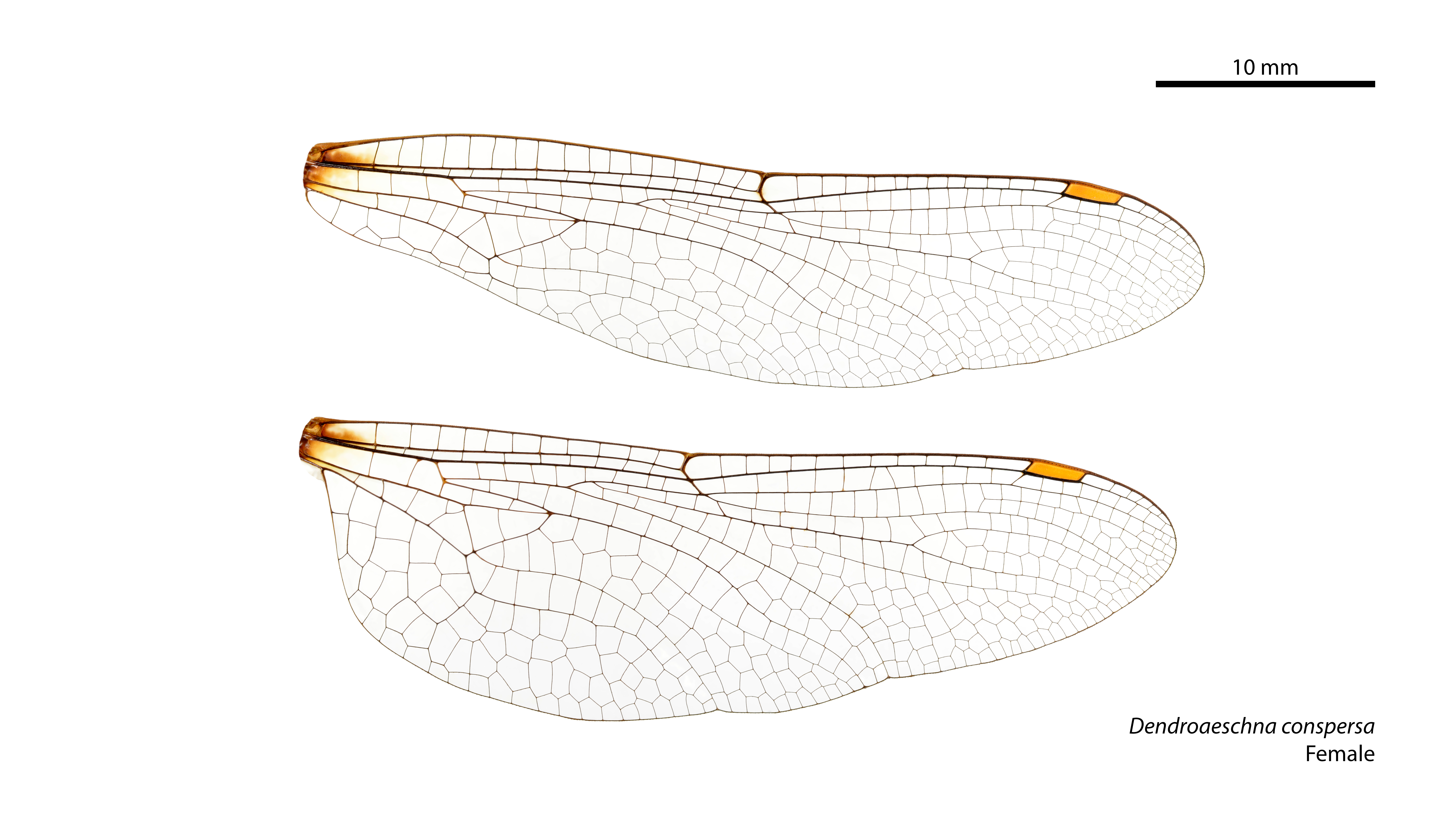
Female Dendroaeschna conspersa wings

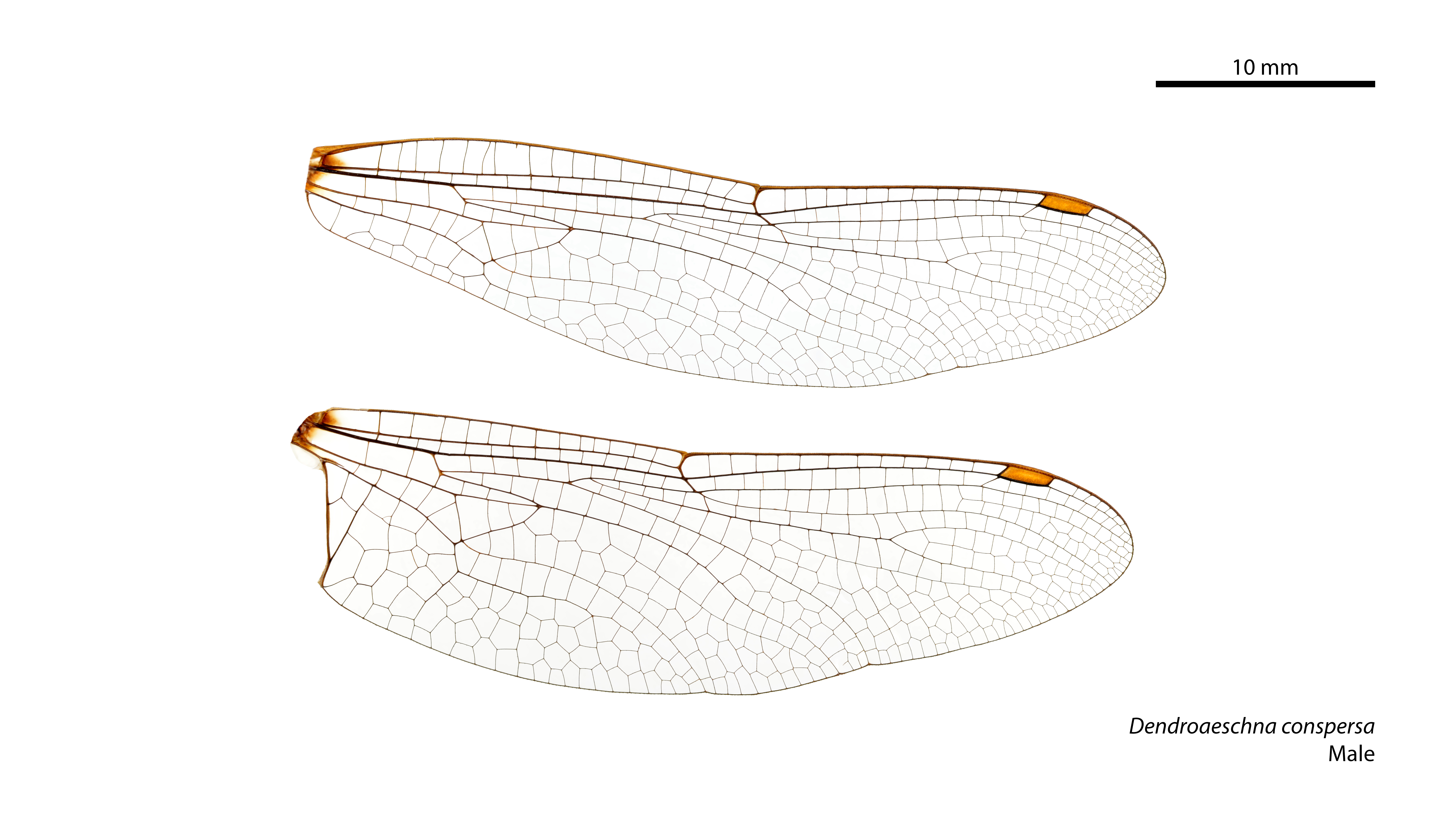
Male Dendroaeschna conspersa wings

== See also ==
- List of Odonata species of Australia
