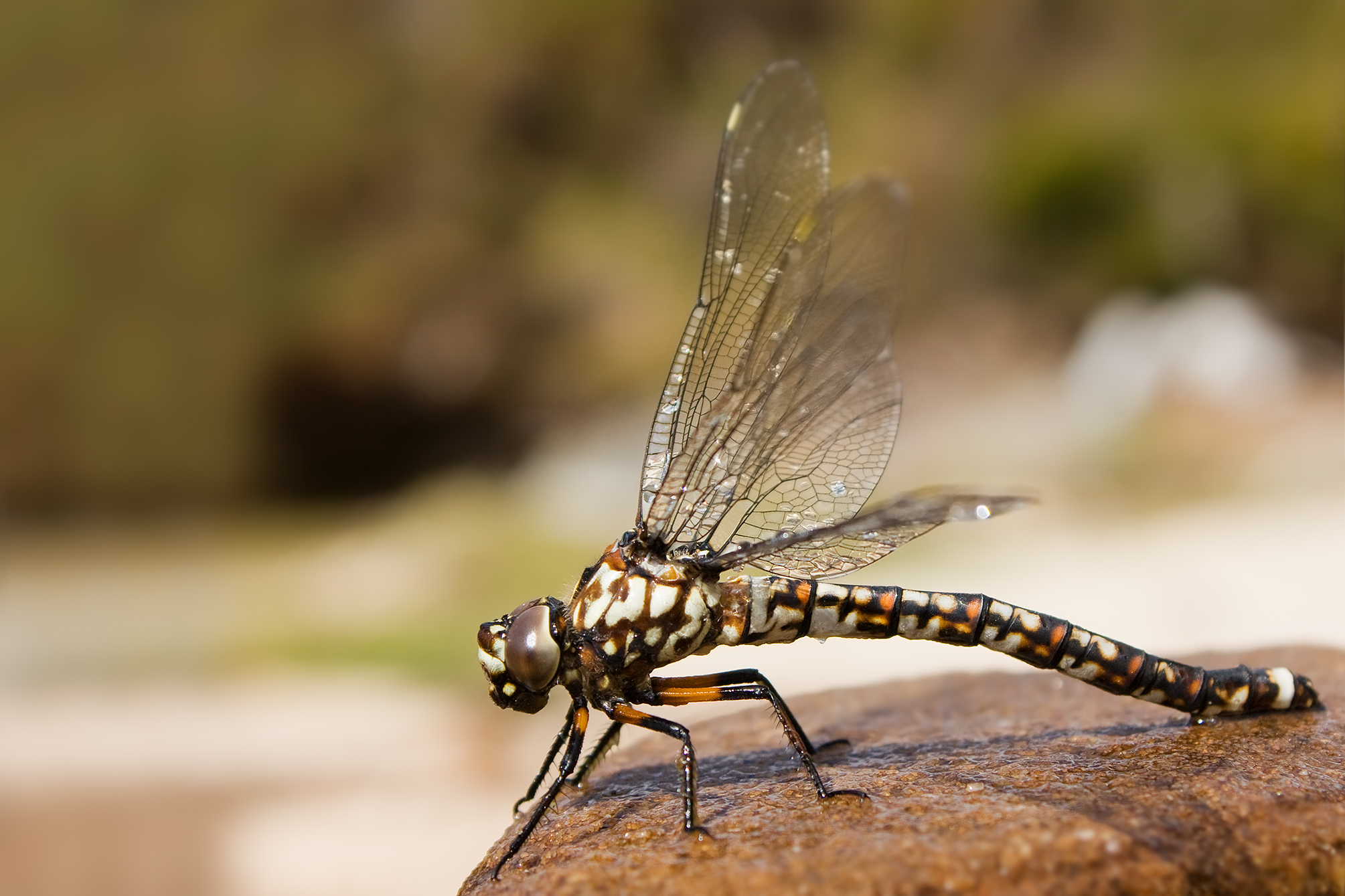
- Tasmanian darner (Austroaeschna tasmanica)

Scientific classification
- Kingdom: Animalia
- Phylum: Arthropoda
- Clade: Pancrustacea
- Class: Insecta
- Order: Odonata
- Infraorder: Anisoptera
- Superfamily: Aeshnoidea
- Family: Aeshnidae; Leach, 1815
- Distribution of Aeshnidae

Synonyms
- Allopetaliidae Cockerell, 1913; Brachytronidae Cockerell, 1913; Caliaeschnidae Bechly, 1996; Gomphaeschnidae Tillyard & Fraser, 1940; Gynacanthidae Cockerell, 1913; Telephlebiidae Cockerell, 1913

= Aeshnidae =

Aeshnidae Temporal range: Berriasian to present

Family of dragonflies

Aeshnidae, also called aeshnids, hawkers, or darners, is a family of dragonflies, found nearly worldwide, with more than 50 genera and over 450 species.

The family includes some of the largest dragonflies, and can be over three inches long.

== Description ==
Common worldwide or nearly worldwide genera are Aeshna and Anax. Anax includes some of the largest dragonflies, including the North American A. walsinghami, Hawaiian A. strenuus, European A. imperator and A. immaculifrons, and African A. tristis, but these are all exceeded by another member of the family, the Asian Tetracanthagyna plagiata, which, by both wingspan and weight, is the world's largest dragonfly.

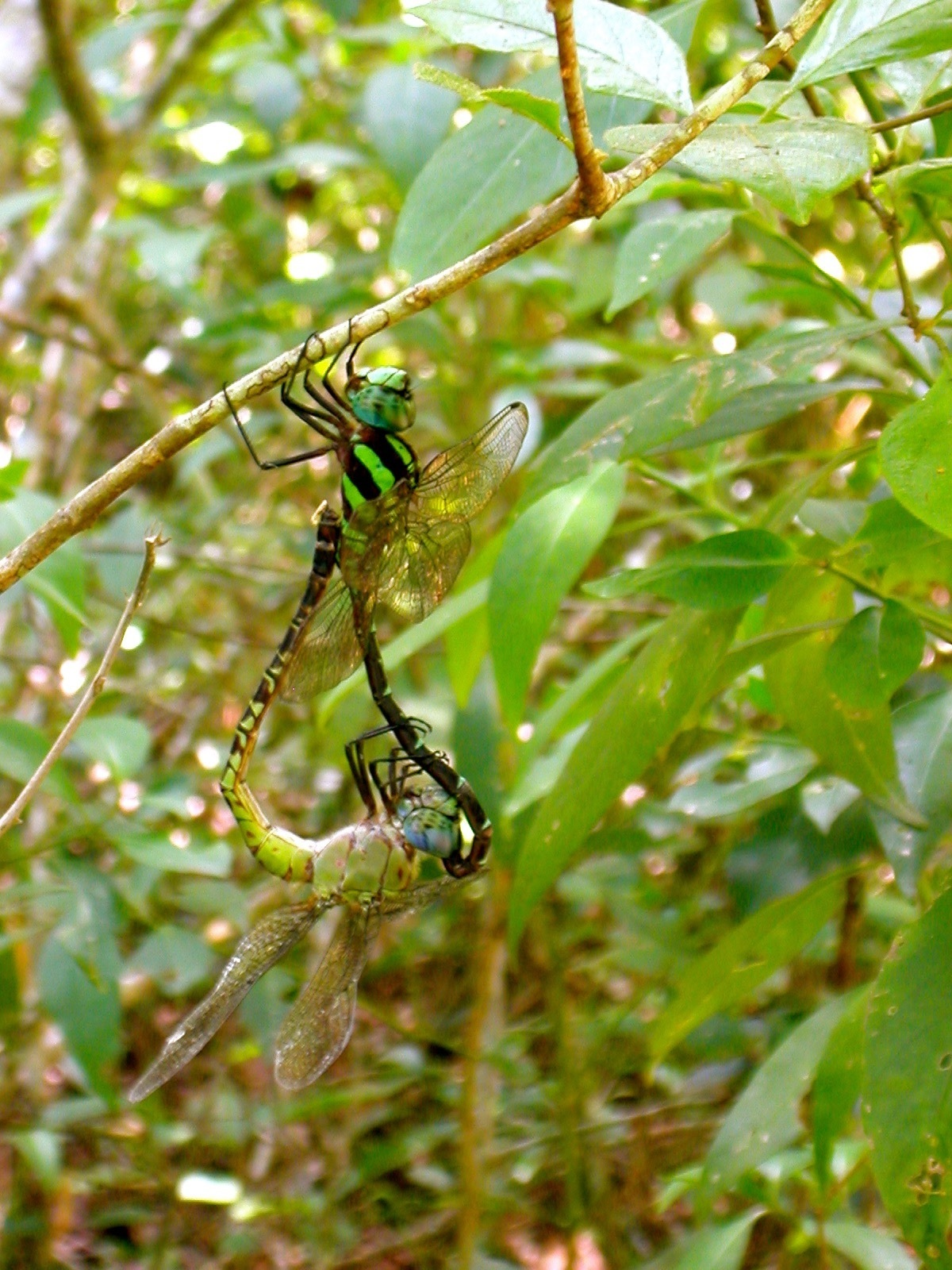
Hybridization between a male Remartinia secreta (top) and a female Coryphaeschna viriditas (bottom)

There are 41 North American species in 11 genera in this family. Most European species belong to Aeshna. Their American name "darner" stems from the female abdomens looking like a sewing needle, as they cut into plant stems when they lay their eggs through the ovipositor.

These dragonflies mate in flight. The eggs are deposited in water or close by. The larvae (nymphs or naiads) are generally slender compared to those of other families, with a long and flat extensible lower lip (labium). The larvae are aquatic predators, feeding on other insects and even small fish.

The adults spend large amounts of time in the air and seem to fly tirelessly with their four large and powerful wings. They can fly forwards, backwards, or hover like a helicopter. The wings are always extended horizontally.

Their abdomens are long and thin. Most are colored blue and/or green, with black and occasionally yellow. Their large, hemispherical compound eyes touch in the midline and nearly cover their heads. They have extremely good vision and are voracious insect predators, using their sharp, biting mouthparts.

All are difficult to catch because of their flying ability and keen sight.

== Taxonomy ==
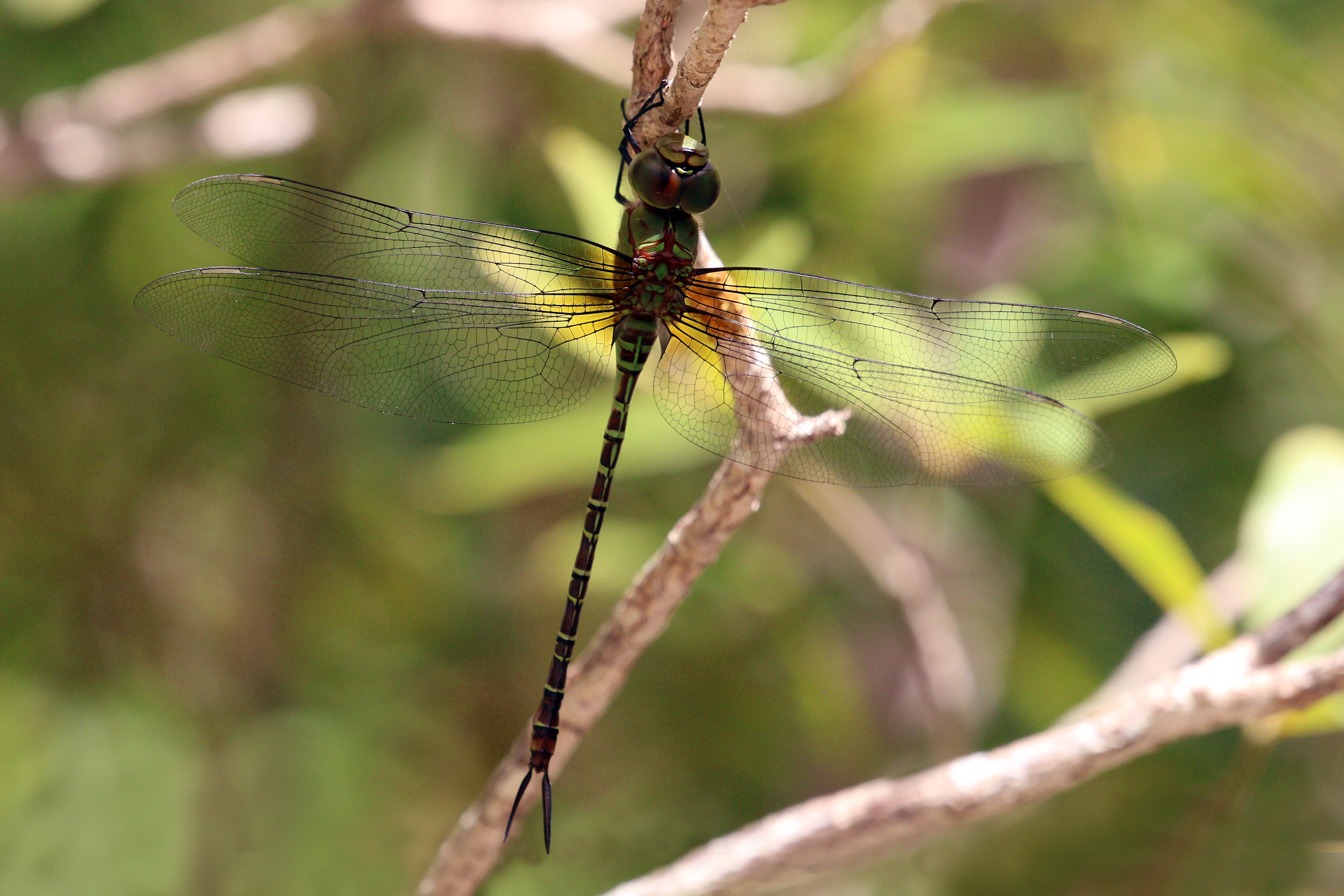
Mangrove darner (Coryphaeschna viriditas), Grand Cayman

The name Aeshnidae was first proposed as a family by Elford Leach in 1815.

The spelling of Aeshnidae may have resulted from a printer's error in spelling the Greek Aechma, "a spear". The spelling Aeschnidae has been intermittently used over a period of time, but is now abandoned for the original name Aeshnidae. However, derived genus names (such as Rhionaeschna) retain the 'sch' spelling, as this is how they were first cited.

== Genera ==
The following genera are currently placed in Aeshnidae:

- Acanthaeschna Selys, 1883
- Adversaeschna Watson, 1992
- Aeschnophlebia Selys, 1883
- Aeshna Fabricius, 1775
- Afroaeschna Peters & Theischinger, 2011
- Agyrtacantha Lieftinck, 1937
- Allopetalia Selys, 1873
- Amphiaeschna Selys, 1871
- Anaciaeschna Selys, 1878
- Anax Leach, 1815
- Andaeschna De Marmels, 1994
- Antipodophlebia Fraser, 1960
- Austroaeschna Selys, 1883
- Austrogynacantha Tillyard, 1908
- Austrophlebia Tillyard, 1916
- Basiaeschna Selys, 1883
- Boyeria McLachlan, 1895
- Brachytron Evans, 1845
- Caliaeschna Selys, 1883
- Castoraeschna Calvert, 1952
- Cephalaeschna Selys, 1883
- Coryphaeschna Williamson, 1903
- Dendroaeschna Tillyard, 1916
- Dromaeschna Förster, 1908
- Epiaeschna Hagen in Selys, 1883
- Gomphaeschna Selys, 1871
- Gynacantha Rambur, 1842
- Gynacanthaeschna Fraser, 1921
- Heliaeschna Selys, 1882
- Indaeschna Fraser, 1926
- Isoaeschna Schneider, Vierstraete, Kosterin, Ikemeyer, Hu, Snegovaya & Dumont, 2023
- Limnetron Förster, 1907
- Linaeschna Martin, 1908
- Nasiaeschna Selys in Förster, 1907
- Neuraeschna Hagen, 1867
- Notoaeschna Tillyard, 1916
- Oligoaeschna Selys, 1889
- Oplonaeschna Selys, 1883
- Oreaeschna Lieftinck, 1937
- Periaeschna Martin, 1908
- Petaliaeschna Fraser, 1927
- Pinheyschna Peters & Theischinger, 2011
- Plattycantha Förster, 1908
- Polycanthagyna Fraser, 1933
- Racenaeschna Calvert, 1958
- Remartinia Navás, 1911
- Rhionaeschna Förster, 1909
- Sarasaeschna Karube & Yeh, 2001
- Spinaeschna Theischinger, 1982
- Staurophlebia Brauer, 1865
- Sundaeschna Kiyoshi & Katatani, 2018
- Telephlebia Selys, 1883
- Tetracanthagyna Selys, 1883
- Triacanthagyna Selys, 1883
- Zosteraeschna Peters & Theischinger, 2011

== Fossils ==
The oldest known members of the family are †Gomphaeschna inferna Pritykina, 1977 and †Baissaeschna Pritykina, 1977, both from the earliest Cretaceous (Berriasian) of Buryatia, Russia.

Gomphaeschna displays a very ancient divergence from the rest of the genus, and many fossil dragonfly genera appear to be closely related to it. For this reason, some studies have placed it and its fossil relatives in their own family, Gomphaeschnidae. However, the World Odonata Checklist presently retains it in Aeshnidae.

=== Fossil genera ===
The following fossil aeshnid genera are known. They have been variously classified in the subfamilies Aeschninae, Allopetalinae or Gomphaeschninae, with the latter two sometimes treated as separate families.

- †Alloaeschna Wighton & Wilson, 1986 (mid-late Paleocene of Alberta, Canada)
- †Anglogomphaeschna Nel & Fleck, 2014 (Late Eocene of England)
- †Antiquiala Archibald & Cannings, 2019 (Early Eocene of Washington, US)
- †Anomalaeschna Bechly et al. 2001 (Aptian of Ceará, Brazil)
- †Baissaeschna Pritykina, 1977 (Berriasian or Aptian of Buryatia, Russia)
- †Cretagomphaeschnaoides Zheng, Jarzembowski, Chang & Wang, 2016 (Cenomanian of Myanmar)
- †Cretalloaeschna Jarzembowski & Nel, 1996 (Berriasian of England)
- †Elektrogomphaeschna Pinkert, Bechly & Nel, 2017 (Late Eocene of Kaliningrad, Russia)
- †Eoshna Archibald & Cannings, 2019 (Early Eocene of British Columbia, Canada)
- †Falsisophoaeschna Zhang, Ren & Pang, 2008 (Barremian of Inner Mongolia, China)
- †Gomphaeschnaoides Carle & Wighton, 1990 (Aptian of Ceará, Brazil)
- †Huncoaeshna Petrulevičius, Nel & Voisin, 2010 (Early Eocene of Argentina)
- †Idemlinea Archibald & Cannings, 2019 (Early Eocene of Washington, US)
- †Jingguaeshna Zheng & Zhang, 2021 (Middle Miocene of Yunnan, China)
- †Kachinaeshna Zheng et al., 2019 (Cenomanian of Myanmar)
- †Kishenehna Archibald & Cannings, 2022 (Lutetian of Montana, US)
- †Kvacekia Prokop & Nel, 2002 (Early Oligocene of the Czech Republic)
- †Merlax Prokop & Nel, 2000 (Early Miocene of the Czech Republic)
- †Necracantha Martynov, 1929 (Late Oligocene of Kazakhstan)
- †Oligaeschna Piton & Théobald, 1939 (Middle Eocene to Middle Miocene of Europe, Colorado (US) & China)
- †Palaeaeschna Meunier, 1914 (Barremian of Spain)
- †Parabaissaeshna Bechly & Rasmussen, 2019 (earliest Eocene of Denmark)
- †Paramorbaeschna Bechly et al. 2001 (Aptian of Ceará, Brazil)
- †Plesigomphaeschnaoides Bechly et al. 2001 (Hauterivian to Early Eocene of England, Mongolia, and Denmark)
- †Progomphaeschnaoides Bechly et al. 2001 (Aptian of Ceará, Brazil)
- †Sinojagoria Bechly et al. 2001 (Barremian of Liaoning, China)
- †Sophoaeschna Zhang, Ren & Pang, 2008 (Barremian of Inner Mongolia, China)
- †Ypshna Archibald & Cannings, 2019 (Early Eocene of British Columbia, Canada)

== See also ==
- List of dragonflies (Aeshnidae)
