= Green Emperor =

Green Emperor may refer to:

- The Green Emperor, a 1939 German film
- Anax gibbosulus, a species of dragonfly
- Cangdi, one of the five forms of the deity Wufang Shangdi
- Împăratul Verde, a character in the Romanian tale Harap-Alb
