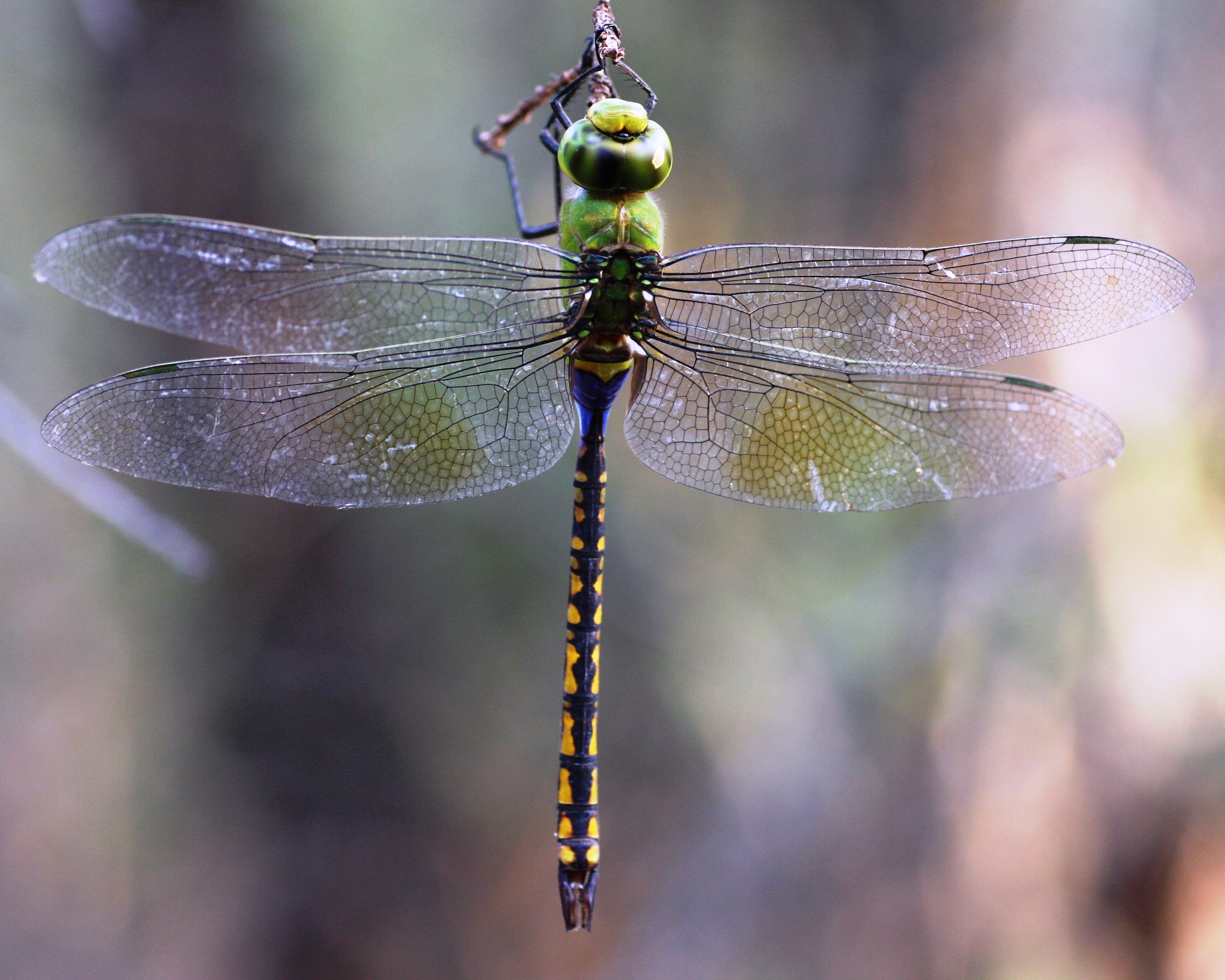
- male
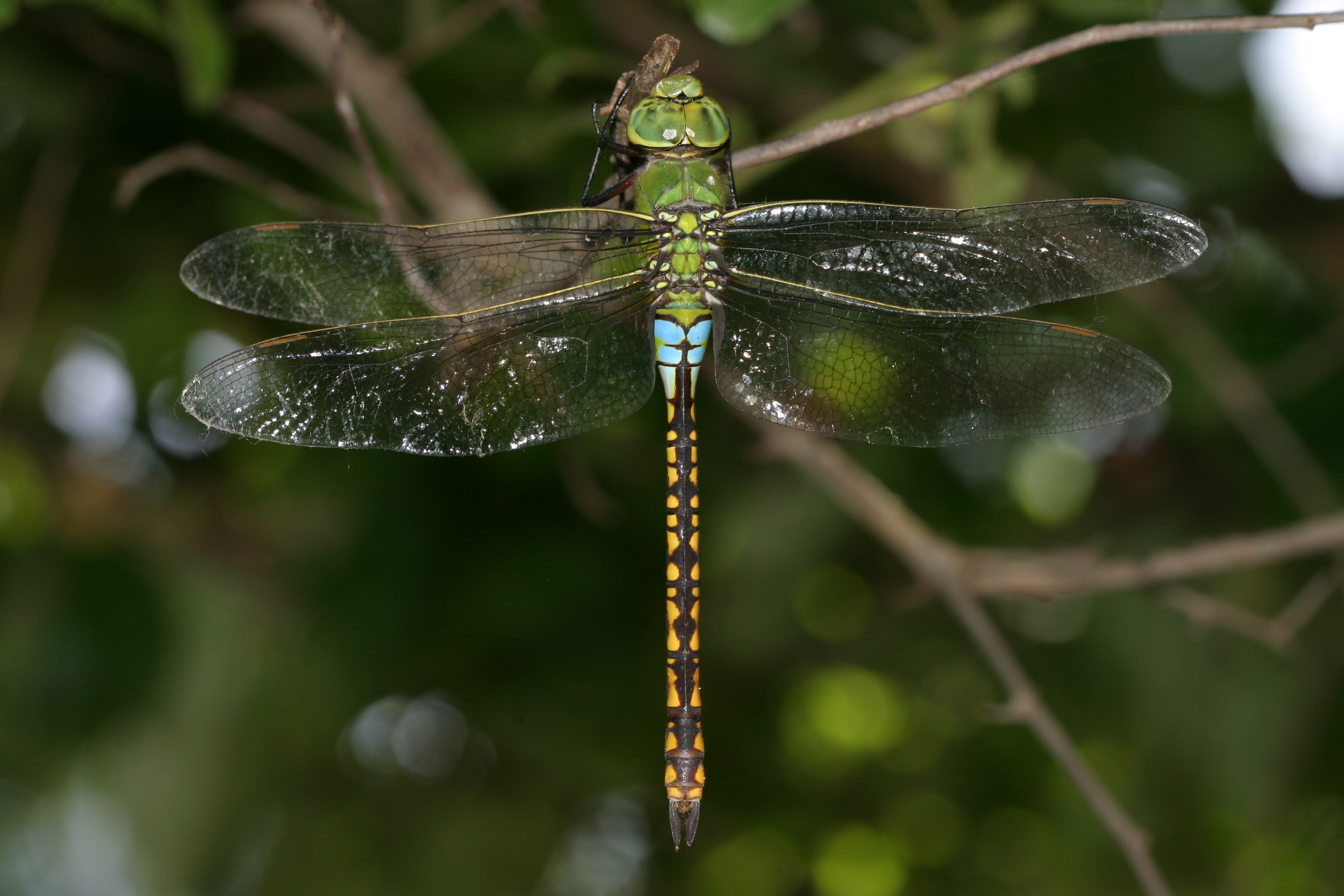
- female

Conservation status
- Least Concern (IUCN 3.1)

Scientific classification
- Kingdom: Animalia
- Phylum: Arthropoda
- Clade: Pancrustacea
- Class: Insecta
- Order: Odonata
- Infraorder: Anisoptera
- Family: Aeshnidae
- Genus: Anax
- Species: A. indicus

Binomial name
- Anax indicus Lieftinck, 1942

= Anax indicus =

Species of dragonfly

Anax indicus is a species of dragonfly in the family Aeshnidae. It is found in India, Nepal, Pakistan, Sri Lanka, and Thailand.

== Description and habitat ==
It is a big dragonfly with blue eyes, pale green thorax and dark brown abdomen with bright yellowish-red markings on the sides. Its wings are transparent; but there are brown patches on the inner half of the hind-wings. Segment 1 and sides of segment 2 of the abdomen are pale green. The dorsum of segment 2 is blue with a narrow and broken transverse carina in the midst of the segment in addition to the broad terminal carinae. The dorsal side of segment 3 is blue with a black longitudinal mid-dorsal black line and sides are silvery white. The remaining segments are dark brown with yellowish-red dots on the sides. Segments 4 to 6 are with a pair of bright yellowish-red spots. On 7-8 these spots combine to form a continuous yellow band. Segments 9 to 10 are with a pair of large yellowish-red spots. Anal appendages are dark brown; the superiors have a triangular projection at the middle of their inner margin.

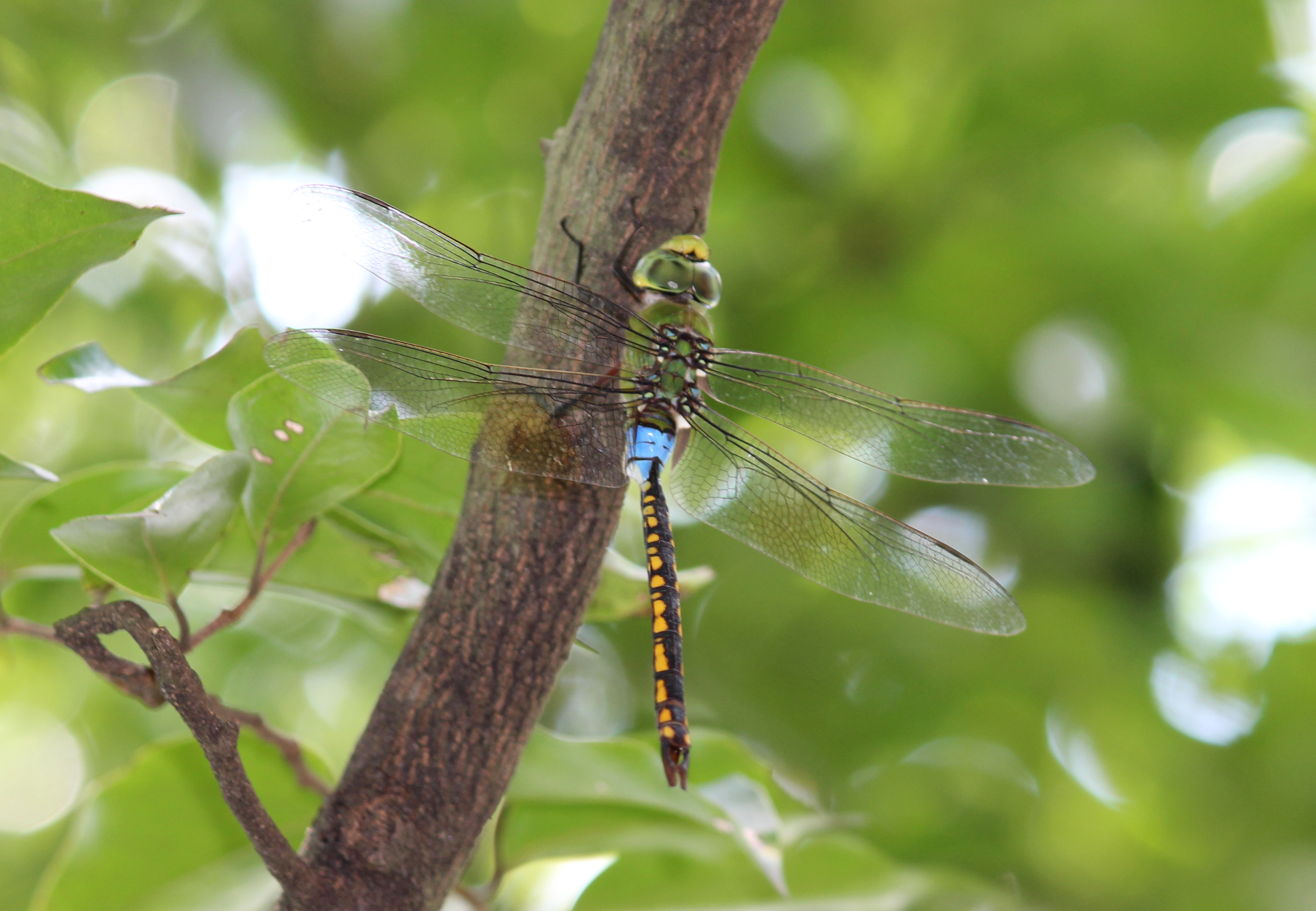
Male in Chinnar Wildlife Sanctuary

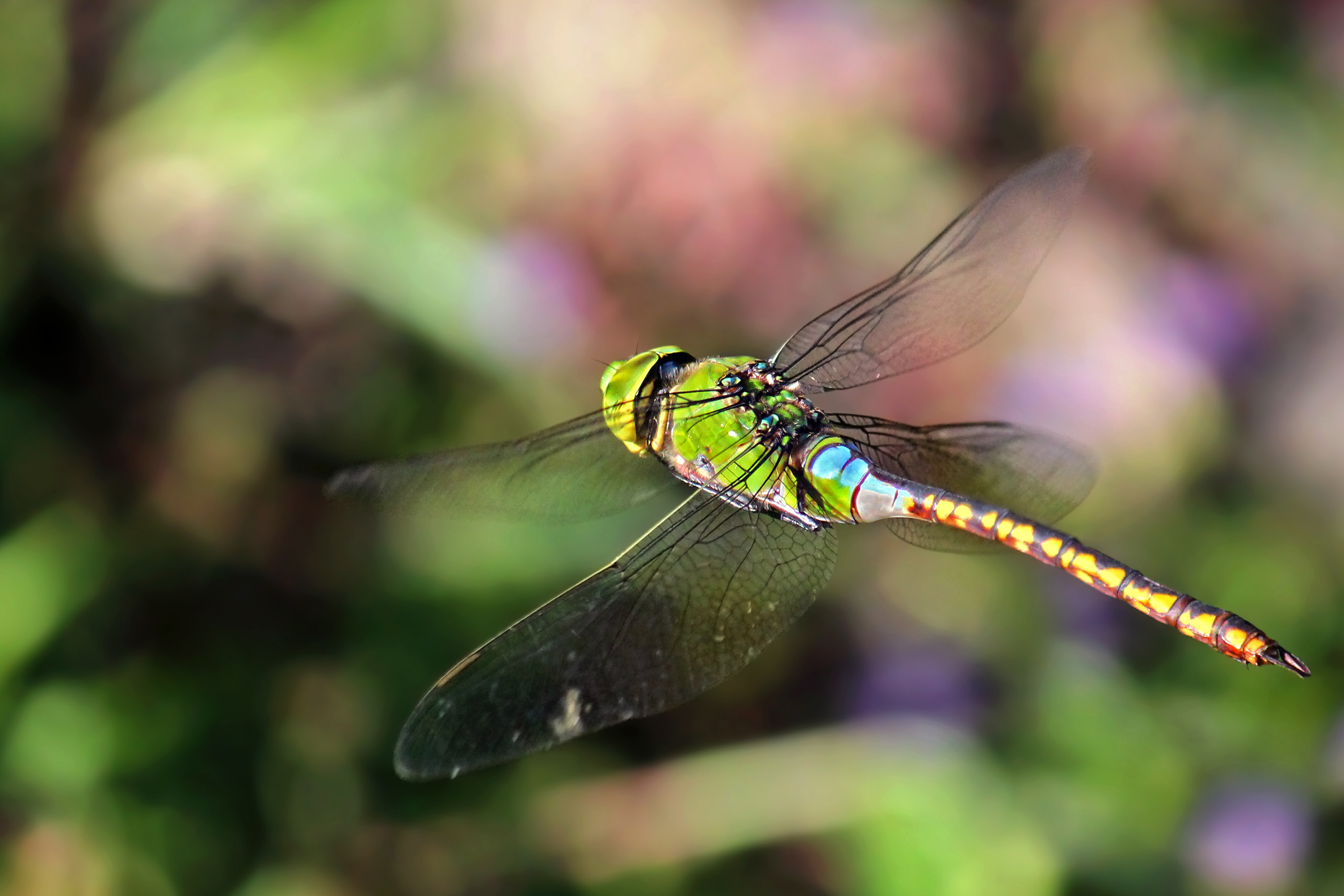
Female

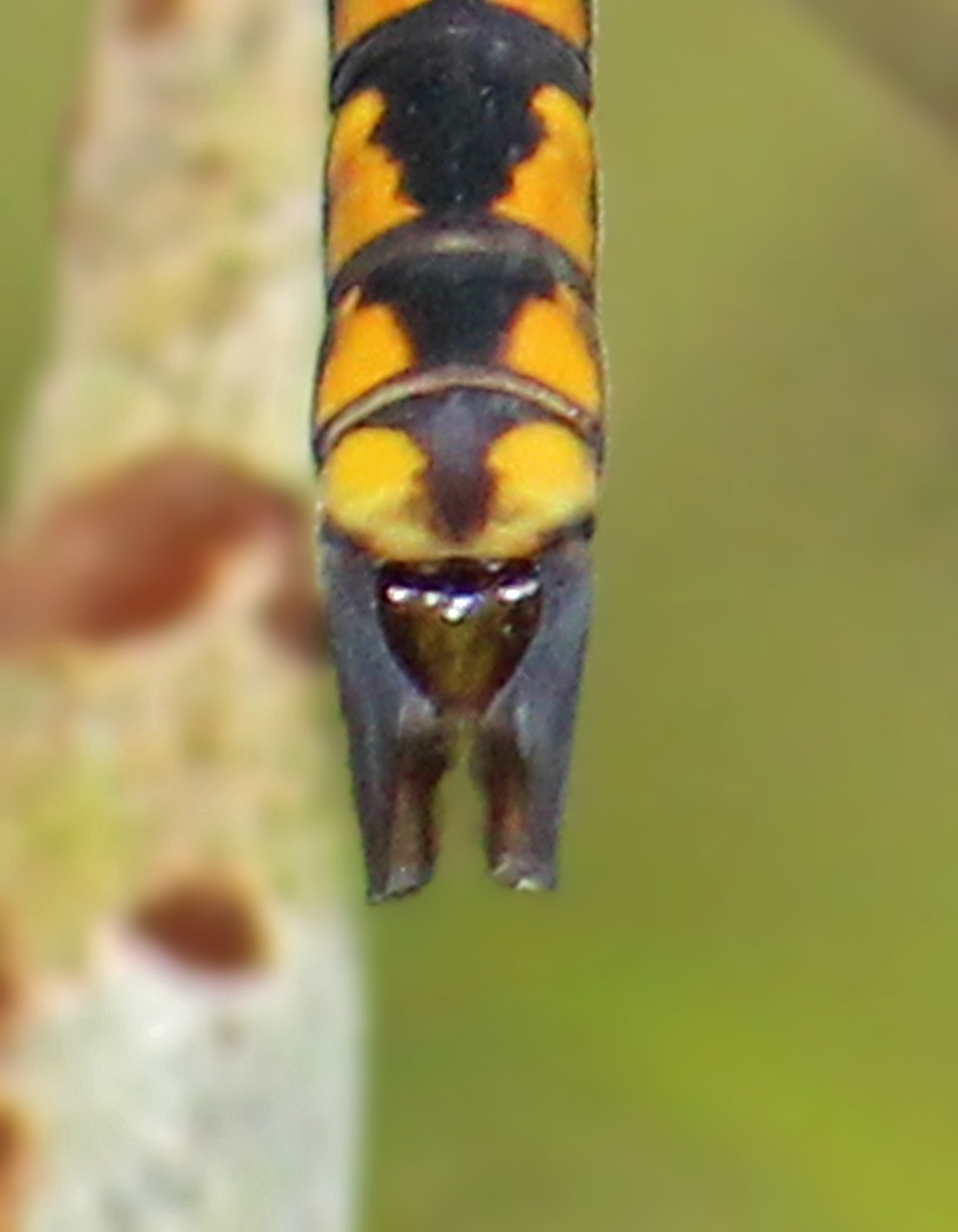
Anal appendages (male)

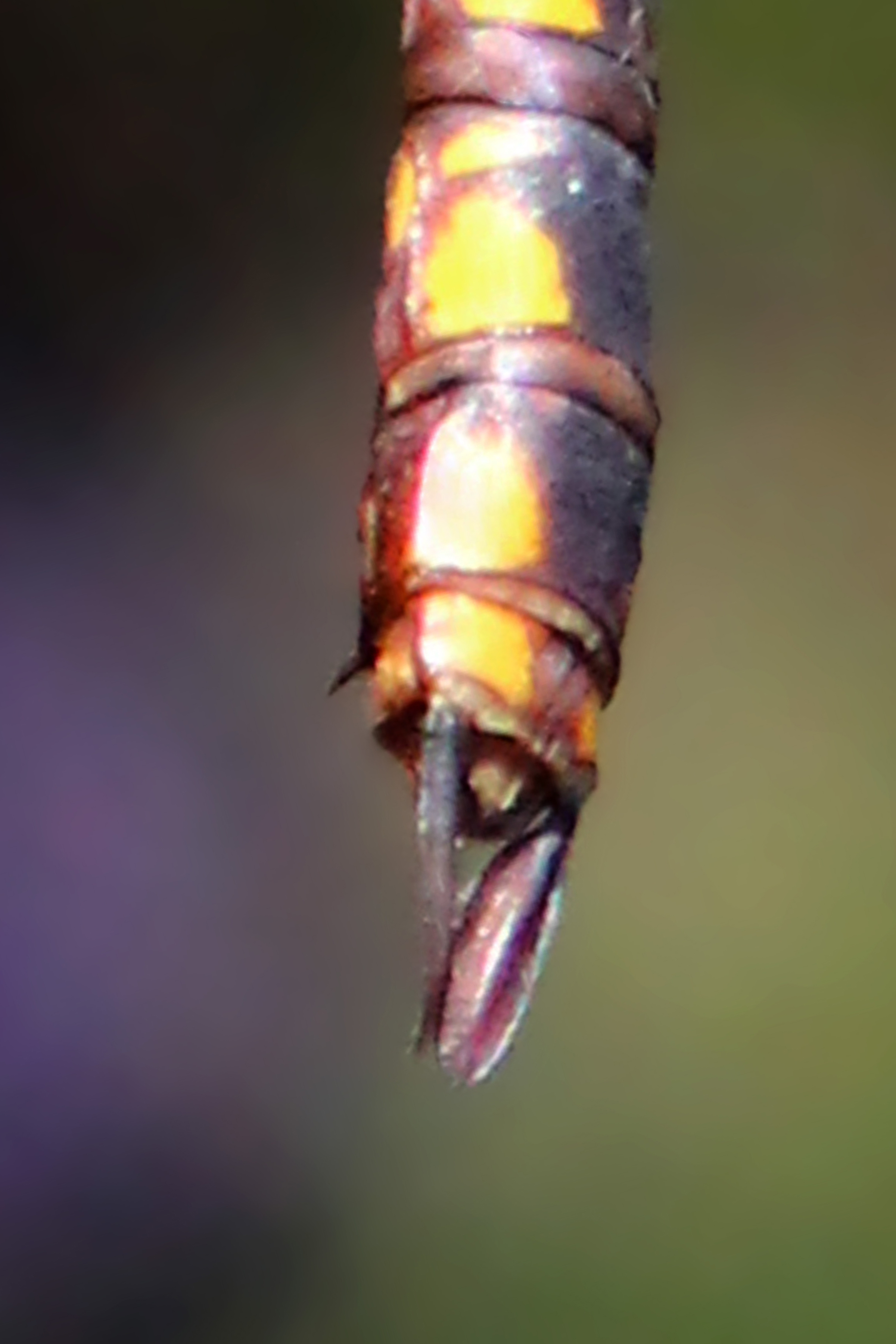
Anal appendages (female)

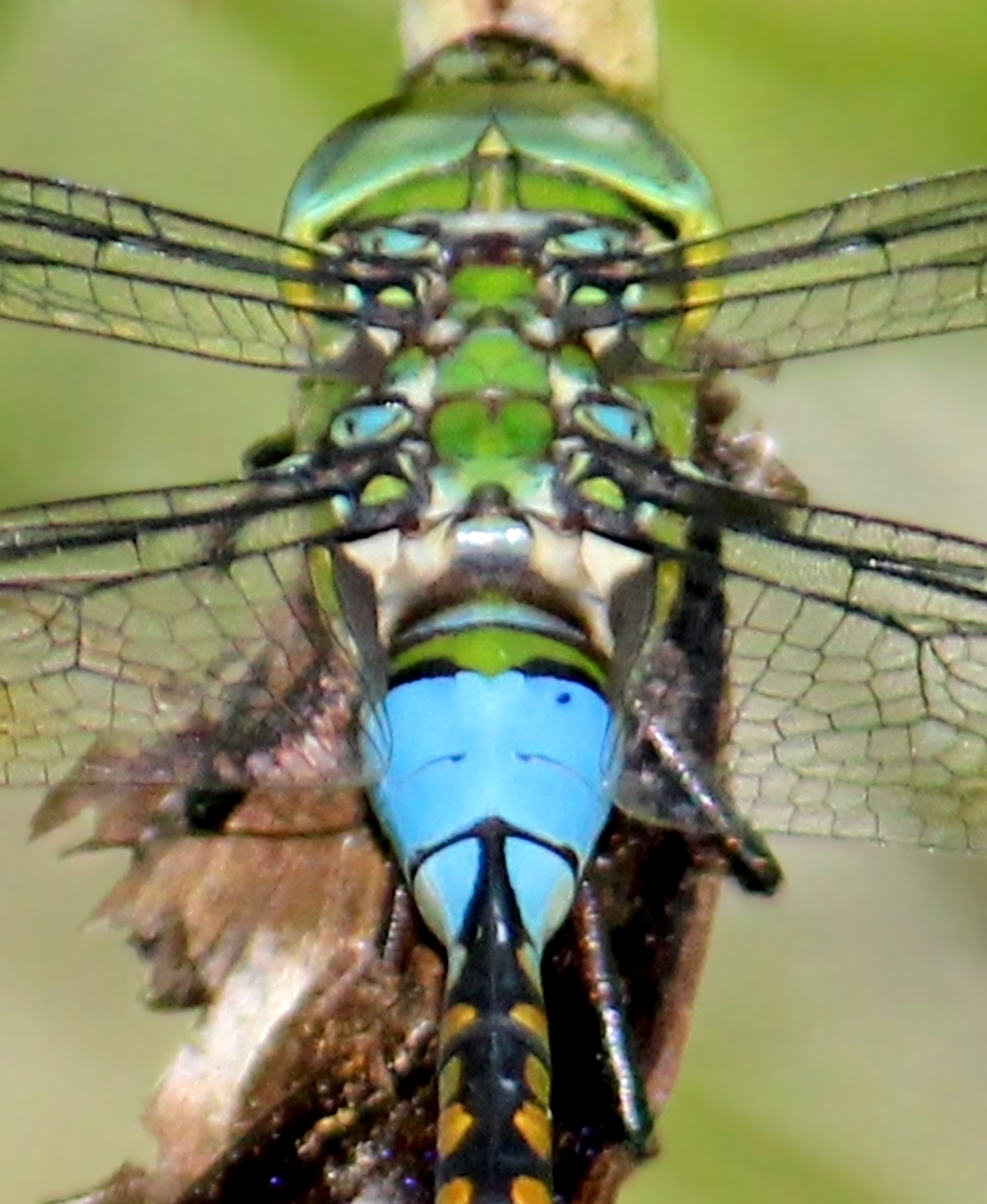
Segment 2 of male

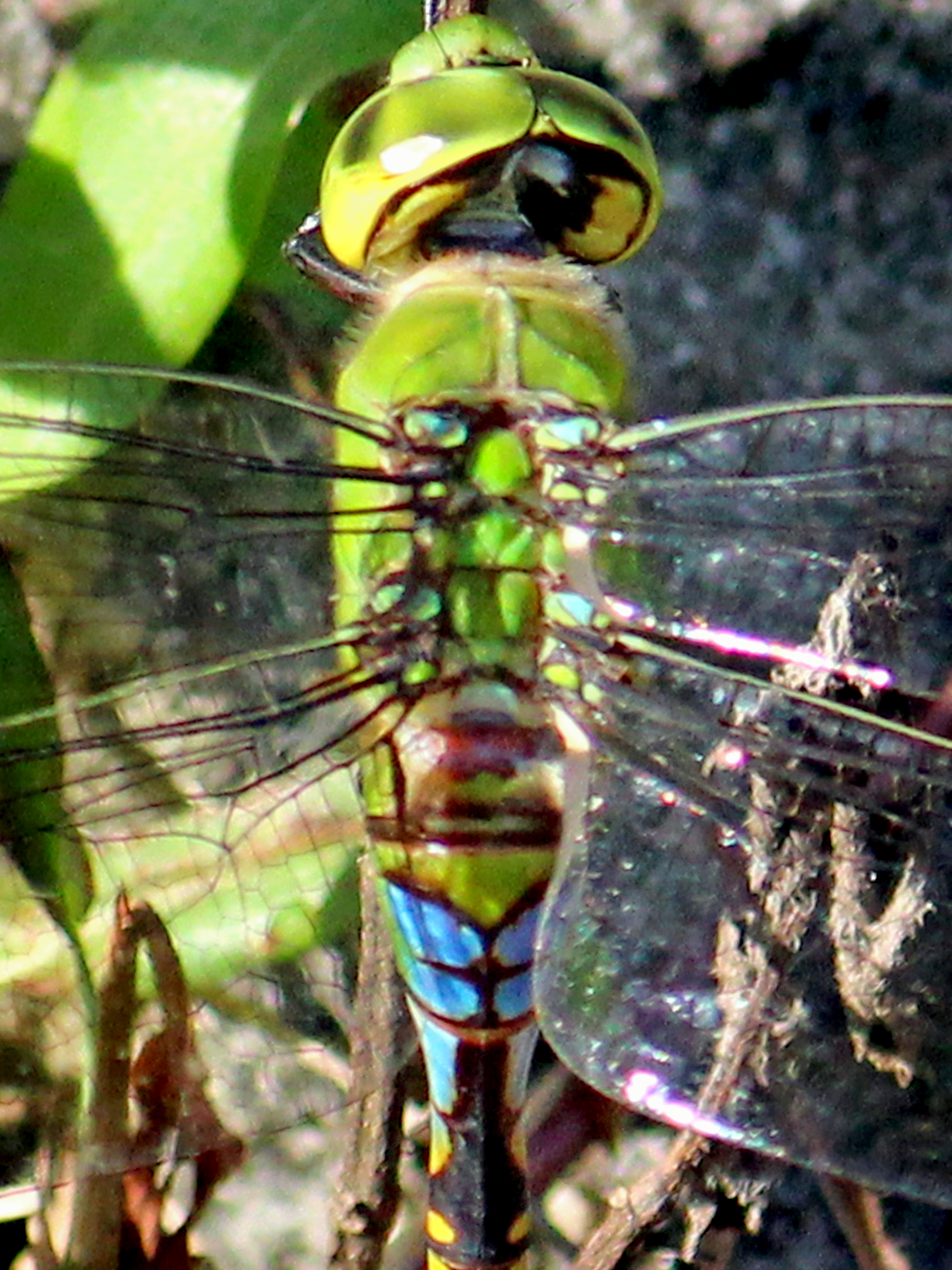
Segment 2 of female

This dragonfly looks similar to Anax guttatus; but can be identifiable by contiguous yellow spots on the posterior abdomen segments (7-8). They are not connected in Anax guttatus.

Females is similar to the male. But the blue on the dorsum of segment 2 will be broken up into four by a narrow brown mid-dorsal carina and a transverse line lying midway to form a cross like mark. Anal appendages are very broad and shaped like lance head.

This species breeds in ponds, marshes and lakes.

== See also ==
- List of odonates of India
- List of odonates of Sri Lanka
