= Orange emperor =

Orange emperor may refer to:

- Anax speratus, a dragonfly species
- Charaxes latona, a butterfly species
