= Anax chloromelas =

Dark emperor

Conservation status
- Least Concern (IUCN 3.1)

Scientific classification
- Kingdom: Animalia
- Phylum: Arthropoda
- Class: Insecta
- Order: Odonata
- Infraorder: Anisoptera
- Family: Aeshnidae
- Genus: Anax
- Species: A. chloromelas

Binomial name
- Anax chloromelas Ris, 1911

Species of dragonfly

Anax chloromelas, the dark emperor, is a species of dragonfly in the family Aeshnidae. It is found in Cameroon, the Democratic Republic of the Congo, Malawi, Mozambique, Nigeria, Sierra Leone, Tanzania, Togo, Uganda, Zambia, and Zimbabwe. Its natural habitats are subtropical or tropical dry forests, subtropical or tropical moist lowland forests, and subtropical or tropical moist shrubland.
