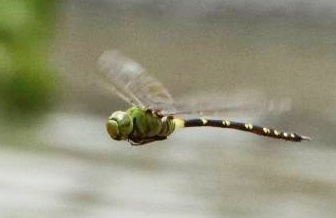
- Male

Conservation status
- Least Concern (IUCN 3.1)

Scientific classification
- Kingdom: Animalia
- Phylum: Arthropoda
- Class: Insecta
- Order: Odonata
- Infraorder: Anisoptera
- Family: Aeshnidae
- Genus: Anax
- Species: A. tristis

Binomial name
- Anax tristis Hagen, 1867

= Anax tristis =

Black emperor

Species of dragonfly

Anax tristis, the black emperor or magnificent emperor, is an African species of dragonfly in the family Aeshnidae. At up to about 120 mm (4.7 in) in total length and 135 mm (5.3 in) in wingspan, it is one of the world's largest dragonflies and the largest in Africa.

This common species has been recorded from much of sub-Saharan Africa, including Angola, Botswana, Cameroon, Chad, Comoros, Ivory Coast, Equatorial Guinea, Gabon, Gambia, Ghana, Guinea, Kenya, Liberia, Madagascar, Malawi, Mauritania, Mozambique, Namibia, Nigeria, South Africa, Sudan, Tanzania, Togo, Uganda, Zambia, Zimbabwe, possibly Burundi, and possibly Ethiopia. It has been recorded once as a vagrant in the Maldives and in Oman. It is found at pools, waterholes, dams, marshes and other types of usually small, standing and temporary waters, generally in open habitats such as savannas but sometimes also in forest openings.
