= Anax georgius =

Kimberley emperor

Conservation status
- Data Deficient (IUCN 3.1)

Scientific classification
- Kingdom: Animalia
- Phylum: Arthropoda
- Clade: Pancrustacea
- Class: Insecta
- Order: Odonata
- Suborder: Anisoptera
- Family: Aeshnidae
- Genus: Anax
- Species: A. georgius

Binomial name
- Anax georgius Selys, 1872

Species of dragonfly

Anax georgius is a species of large dragonfly of the family Aeshnidae, commonly known as the Kimberley emperor. It inhabits ponds in the Kimberley area of Western Australia

Anax georgius is a very large dragonfly with a green body and dark brown tail with pale markings.

== Etymology ==
The genus name Anax is derived from the Greek ἄναξ (anax, "king" or "sovereign"), likely referring to the dominant behaviour of Anax imperator.

The species name georgius is a Latinised personal name, although the reason for its application to this species is unknown.

== Gallery ==
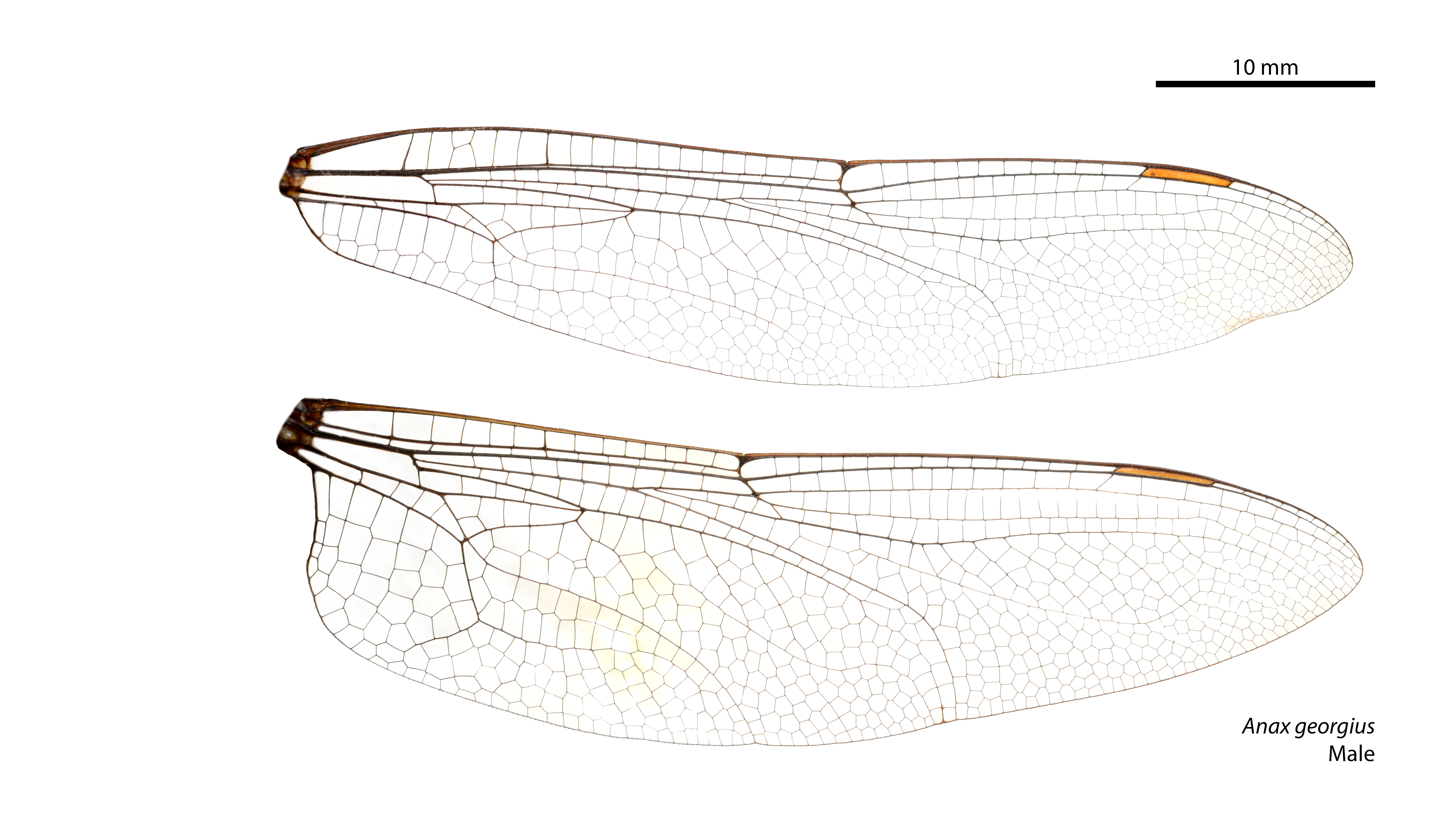
Male wings

== See also ==
- List of Odonata species of Australia
