= Anax bangweuluensis =

Swamp emperor

Conservation status
- Near Threatened (IUCN 3.1)

Scientific classification
- Kingdom: Animalia
- Phylum: Arthropoda
- Class: Insecta
- Order: Odonata
- Infraorder: Anisoptera
- Family: Aeshnidae
- Genus: Anax
- Species: A. bangweuluensis

Binomial name
- Anax bangweuluensis Kimmins, 1955

Species of dragonfly

Anax bangweuluensis, the swamp emperor, is a species of dragonfly in the family Aeshnidae. It is found in Southern Africa, with records from Caprivi Strip of Namibia, Botswana, and Zambia. Its natural habitats are swamps along large rivers and lakes.
