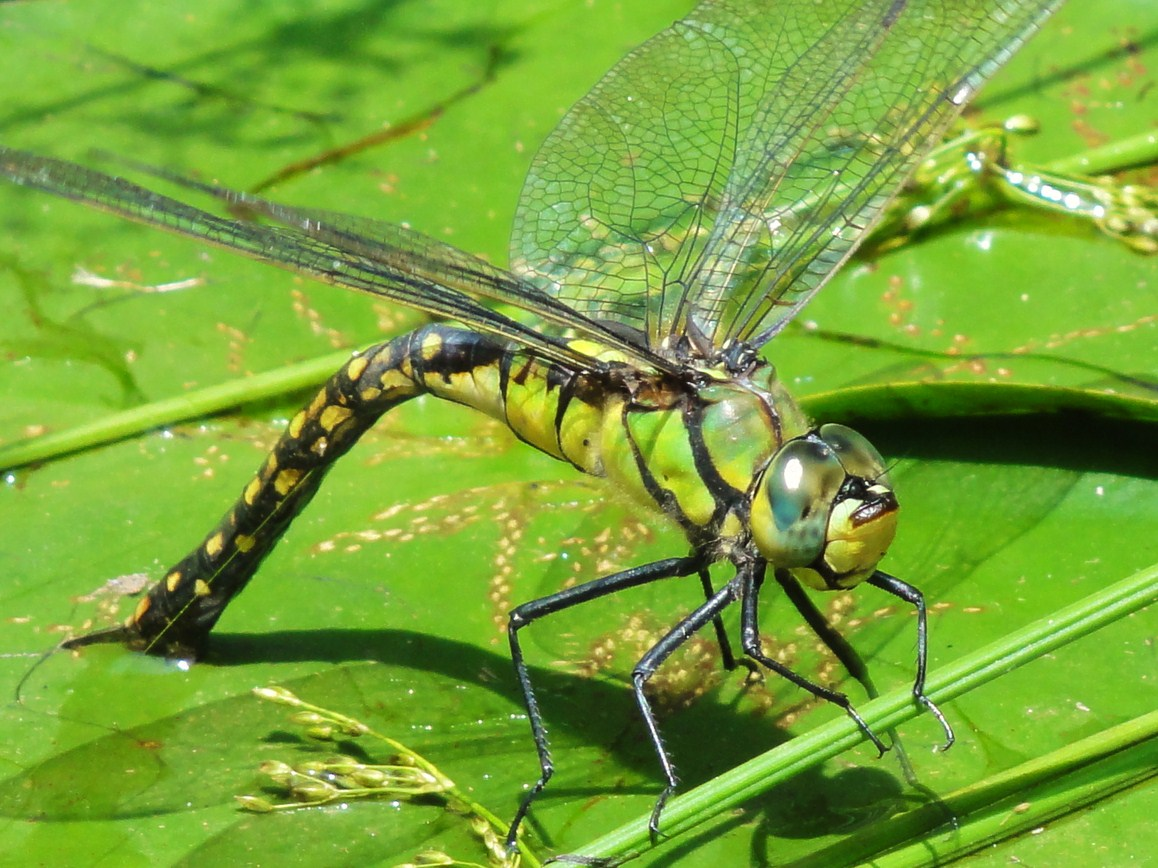

Conservation status
- Least Concern (IUCN 3.1)

Scientific classification
- Kingdom: Animalia
- Phylum: Arthropoda
- Class: Insecta
- Order: Odonata
- Infraorder: Anisoptera
- Family: Aeshnidae
- Genus: Anax
- Species: A. nigrofasciatus

Binomial name
- Anax nigrofasciatus Oguma, 1915

= Anax nigrofasciatus =

Blue-spotted emperor

Species of dragonfly

Anax nigrofasciatus, the blue-spotted emperor, is a species of dragonfly found in Asia.

== Distribution ==
Anax nigrofasciatus was first described from Japan. It is found parts of east and southeast Asia, including the Philippines and northern India, roughly from Japan to the Himalaya mountains.
