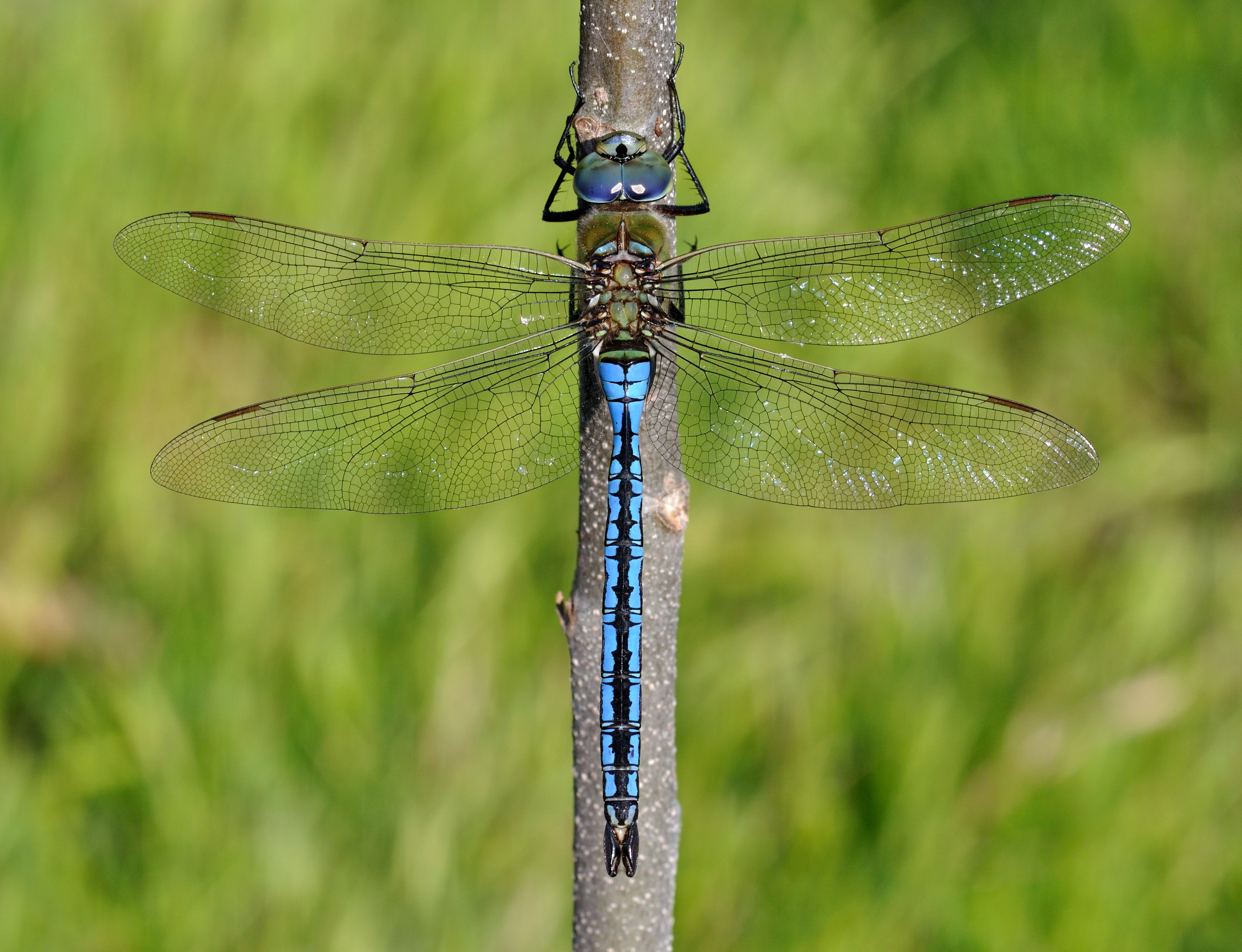
- Anax imperator
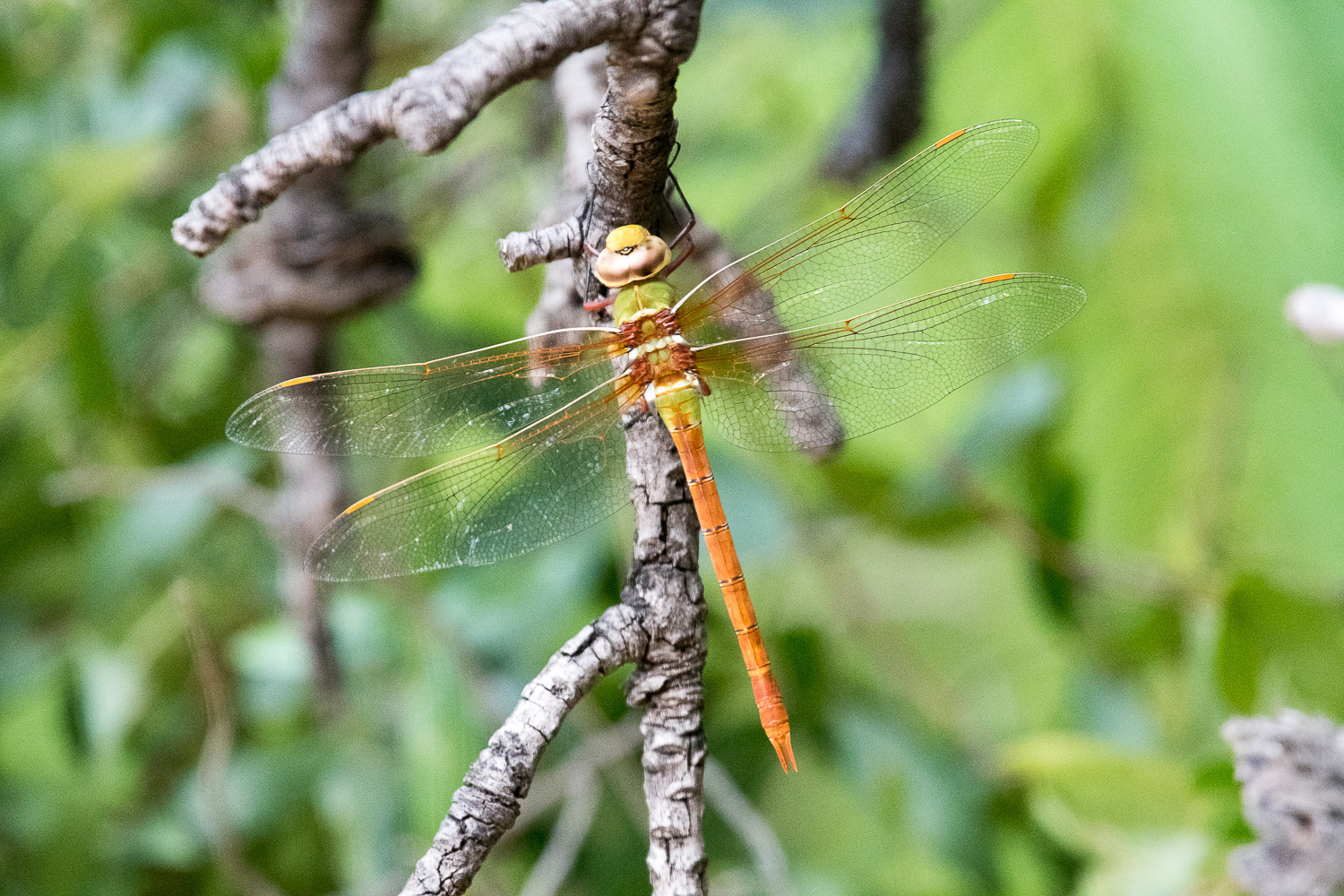
- Anax speratus

Scientific classification
- Kingdom: Animalia
- Phylum: Arthropoda
- Clade: Pancrustacea
- Class: Insecta
- Order: Odonata
- Infraorder: Anisoptera
- Family: Aeshnidae
- Genus: Anax; Leach, 1815

Type species
- Anax imperator Leach, 1815

= Anax (dragonfly) =

Anax Temporal range: Late Miocene to present

Genus of dragonflies

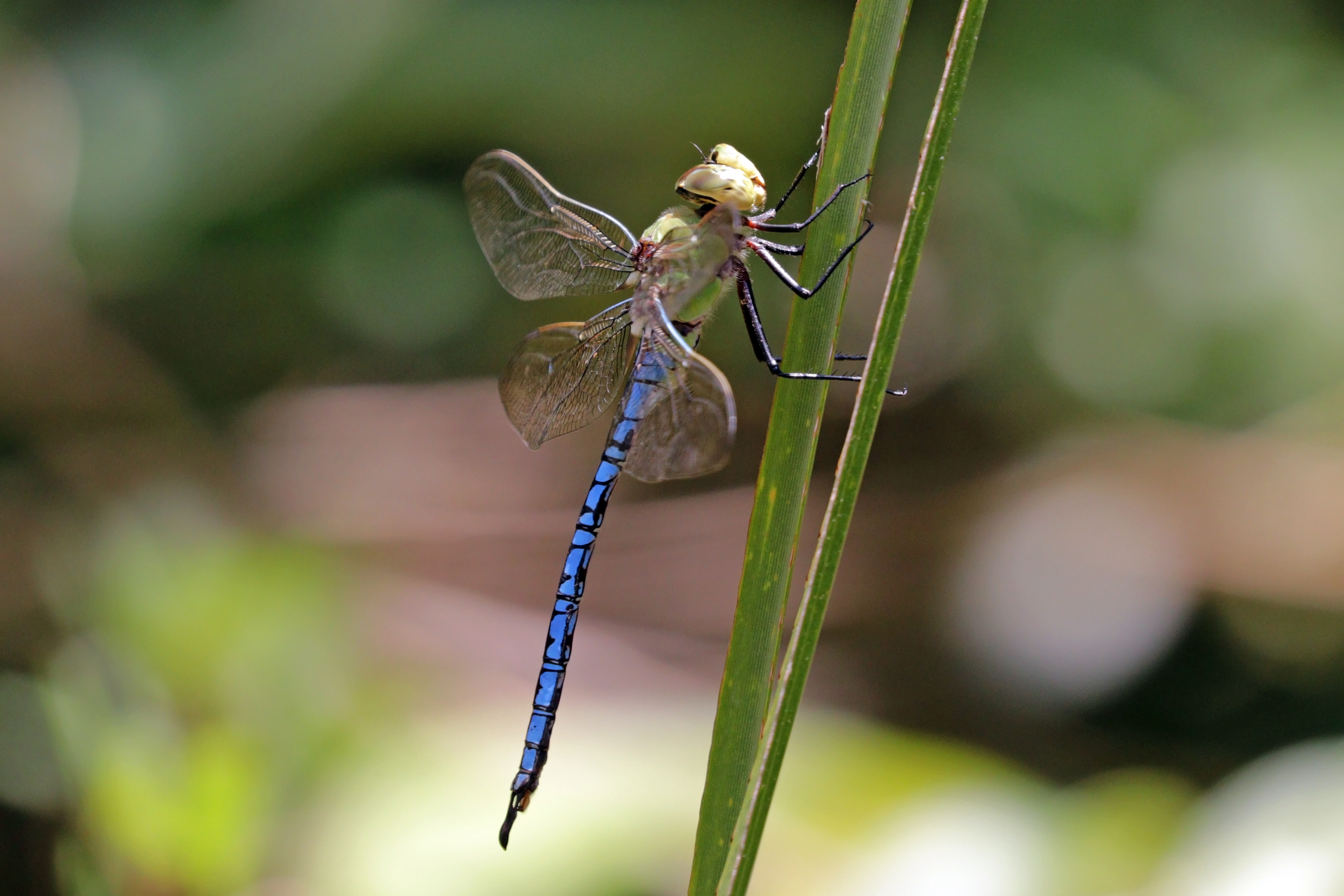
Madagascar emperor male A. tumorifer

Anax (from Ancient Greek ἄναξ anax, "lord, master, king") is a genus of dragonflies in the family Aeshnidae. It includes species such as the emperor dragonfly, Anax imperator.

Species of Anax are very large dragonflies. They generally have light-colored bodies and dark tails with pale markings.

Some species are migratory, for example Anax junius.

== Species ==
The genus Anax includes these species:

- Anax amazili (Burmeister, 1839) – Amazon darner
- Anax aurantiacus Makbun, Wongkamhaeng & Keetapithchayakul, 2022
- Anax bangweuluensis Kimmins, 1955 – swamp emperor
- Anax chloromelas Ris, 1911 – dark emperor
- Anax concolor Brauer, 1865 – blue-spotted comet darner
- Anax congoliath Fraser, 1953
- Anax ephippiger (Burmeister, 1839) – vagrant emperor
- Anax fumosus Hagen, 1867
- Anax georgius Selys, 1872 – Kimberley emperor
- Anax gladiator Dijkstra & Kipping, 2015 – swordbearer emperor
- Anax gibbosulus Rambur, 1842 – green emperor
- Anax guttatus (Burmeister, 1839) – lesser green emperor
- Anax immaculifrons Rambur, 1842 – magnificent emperor
- Anax imperator Leach, 1815 – emperor dragonfly, blue emperor
- Anax indicus Lieftinck, 1942 – elephant emperor
- Anax junius (Drury, 1773) – common green darner
- Anax longipes Hagen, 1861 – comet darner
- Anax maclachlani Förster, 1898
- Anax mandrakae Gauthier, 1988
- Anax nigrofasciatus Oguma, 1915 – blue-spotted emperor
- Anax panybeus Hagen, 1867
- Anax papuensis Burmeister, 1839 – Australian emperor
- Anax parthenope (Selys, 1839) – lesser emperor
- Anax piraticus Kennedy, 1934
- Anax pugnax Lieftinck, 1942
- Anax rutherfordi McLachlan, 1883
- Anax selysi Förster, 1900
- Anax speratus Hagen, 1867 – orange emperor
- Anax strenuus Hagen, 1867 – giant Hawaiian darner, pinao
- Anax tristis Hagen, 1867 – black emperor, magnificent emperor
- Anax tumorifer McLachlan, 1885
- Anax walsinghami McLachlan, 1882 – giant darner

A single fossil species, †Anax cryptus Gentilini & Peters, 1993 is known from the Late Miocene of Italy.

== Taxonomic history ==
The genus Anax was described by William Elford Leach in 1815 when he published the first bibliography of entomology in Brewster's Edinburgh Encyclopedia.
