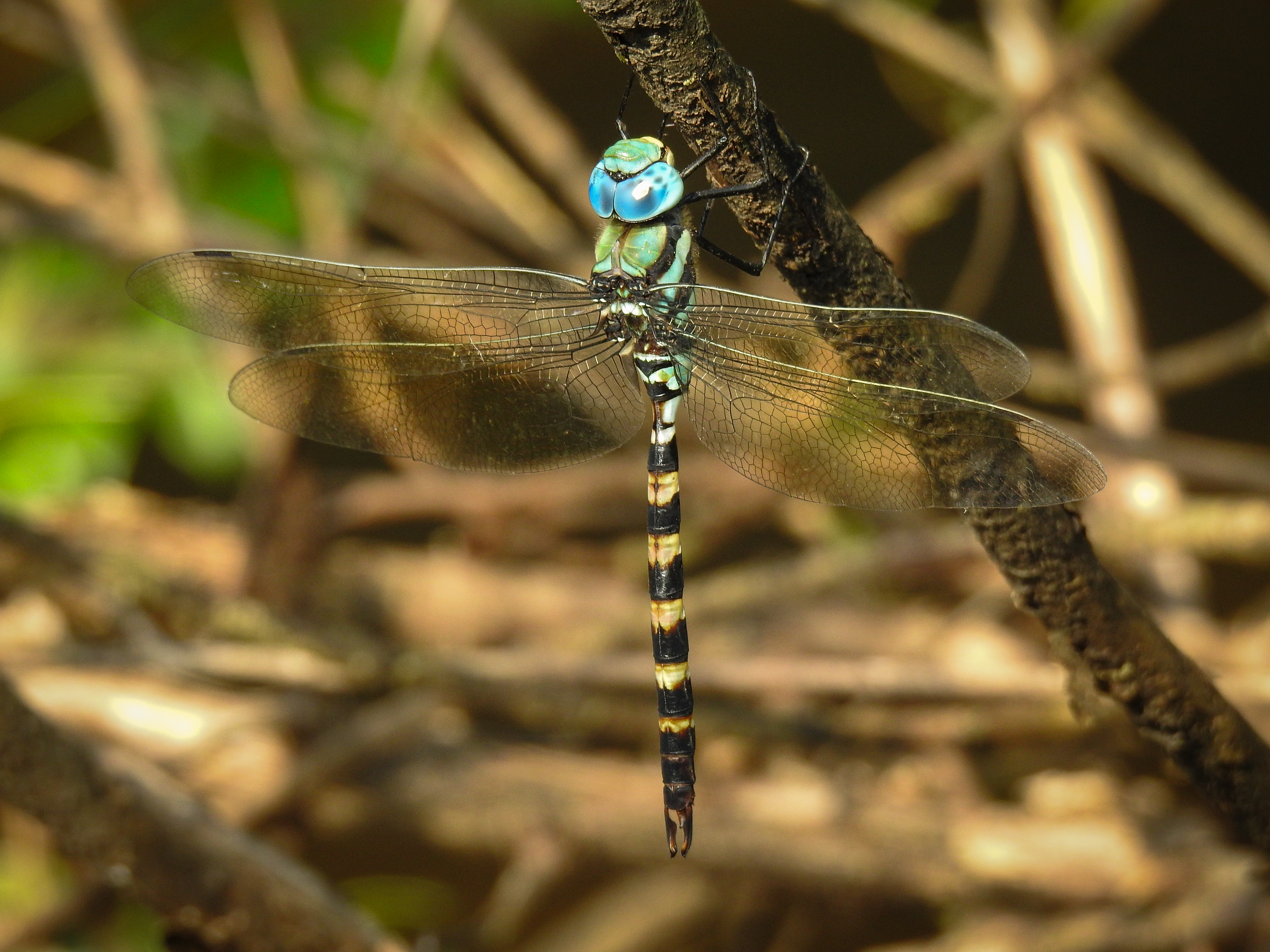
- Male
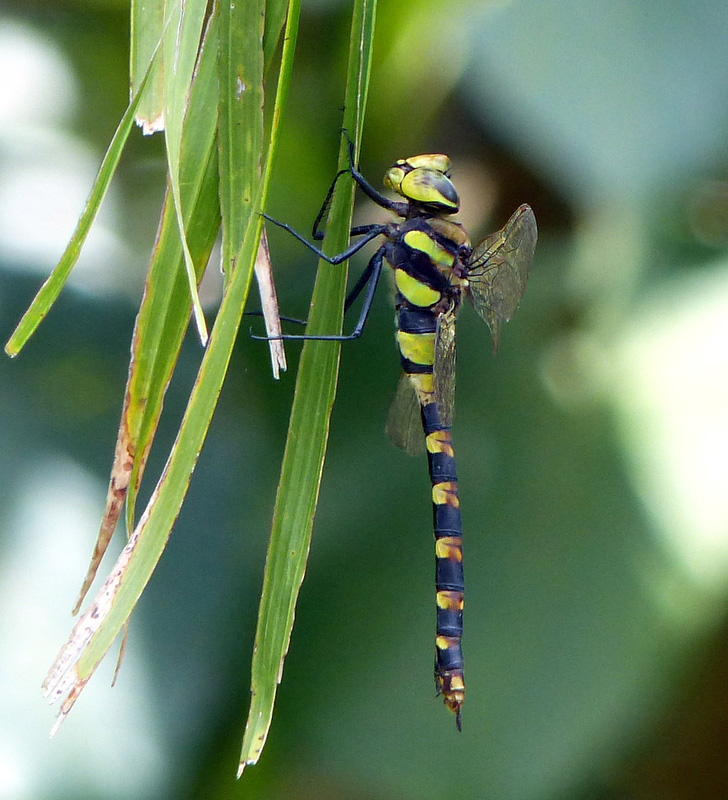
- Female in Kerala, India

Conservation status
- Least Concern (IUCN 3.1)

Scientific classification
- Kingdom: Animalia
- Phylum: Arthropoda
- Clade: Pancrustacea
- Class: Insecta
- Order: Odonata
- Infraorder: Anisoptera
- Family: Aeshnidae
- Genus: Anax
- Species: A. immaculifrons

Binomial name
- Anax immaculifrons Rambur, 1842

= Anax immaculifrons =

Magnificent emperor

Species of dragonfly

Anax immaculifrons, the magnificent emperor, or blue darner, is a species of dragonfly in the family Aeshnidae. Almost all its range is in West and South Asia; it is Europe's largest dragonfly but very marginal in the continent, where it is restricted to the east Aegean Islands and Cyprus. A similar dragonfly further east in Asia is now recognised as a separate species, A. aurantiacus.

== Description ==
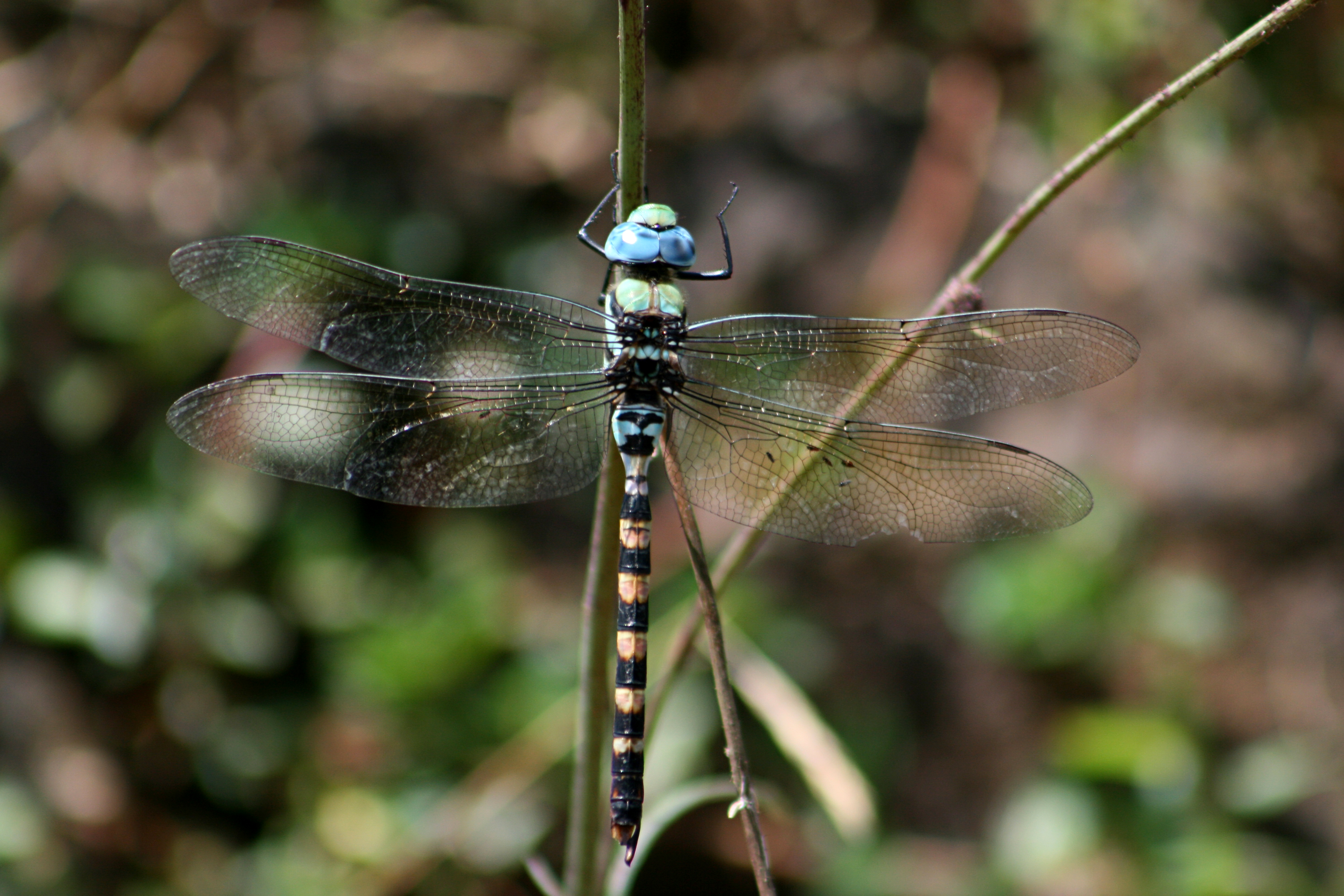
Male in Tamil Nadu, India

A. immaculifrons has a length of 80–86 mm (3.1–3.4 in) and a wingspan of about 120 mm (4.7 in). It is a large, bluish green dragonfly with sapphire-blue eyes, bluish-green thorax, and pale reddish-brown abdomen marked with black. Its thorax is pale bluish-green on dorsum with a blackish-brown mid-dorsal carina and turquoise-blue laterally. There is a narrow black stripe over humeral suture and a very broad one over the postero-lateral suture with a narrow black posterior border on metepimeron. Wings are transparent with amber-yellow tint. Segment 1 of the abdomen is entirely black. Segment 2 is turquoise-blue, with a mid-dorsal transverse mark shaped like a sea-gull in flight. Segment 3 has its basal half turquoise-blue and apical half black, with a small mid-dorsal spot on blue. Segments 4 to 8 are with apical half black and pale reddish-brown at base. Segments 9 and 10 are black on dorsum. A more reddish form from southeast Asia and southern China was formerly included in this species, but in 2022 was recognised as a separate species, A. aurantiacus.

== Behaviour ==
A. immaculifrons is found near slow flowing hill or mountain streams where it breeds. Eggs are inserted into reeds emerging from water.

== See also ==
- Emperor or blue emperor (Anax imperator), a relative that is widespread in Europe
- List of odonata species of India
- List of odonata of Kerala
