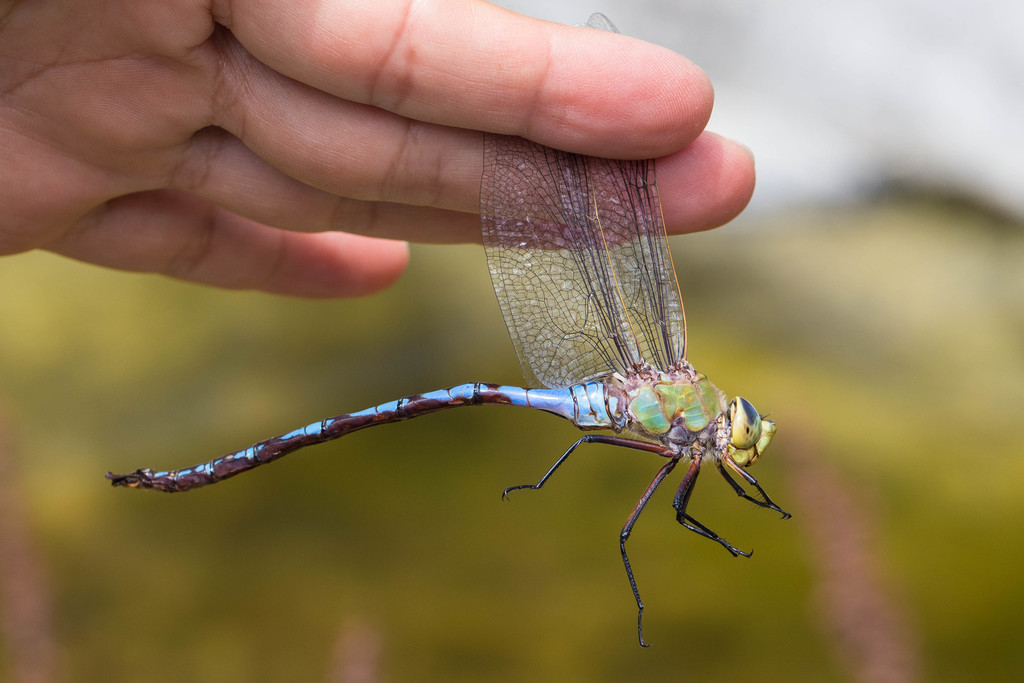

Conservation status
- Least Concern (IUCN 3.1)

Scientific classification
- Kingdom: Animalia
- Phylum: Arthropoda
- Class: Insecta
- Order: Odonata
- Infraorder: Anisoptera
- Family: Aeshnidae
- Genus: Anax
- Species: A. walsinghami

Binomial name
- Anax walsinghami McLachlan, 1883

= Anax walsinghami =

Species of dragonfly

Anax walsinghami is a species of dragonfly in the family Aeshnidae (darners), in the suborder Anisoptera ("dragonflies"). The species is known generally as the giant darner or giant green darner. The distribution range of Anax walsinghami includes Central America and North America. At up to 120 mm (4.7 in) in wingspan and with a typical body length of 89–117 mm (3.5–4.6 in), it is North America's largest dragonfly, although exceeded by the closely related giant Hawaiian darner (A. strenuus).

The IUCN conservation status of A. walsinghami is least concern, with no immediate threat to the species' survival. The population is stable.
