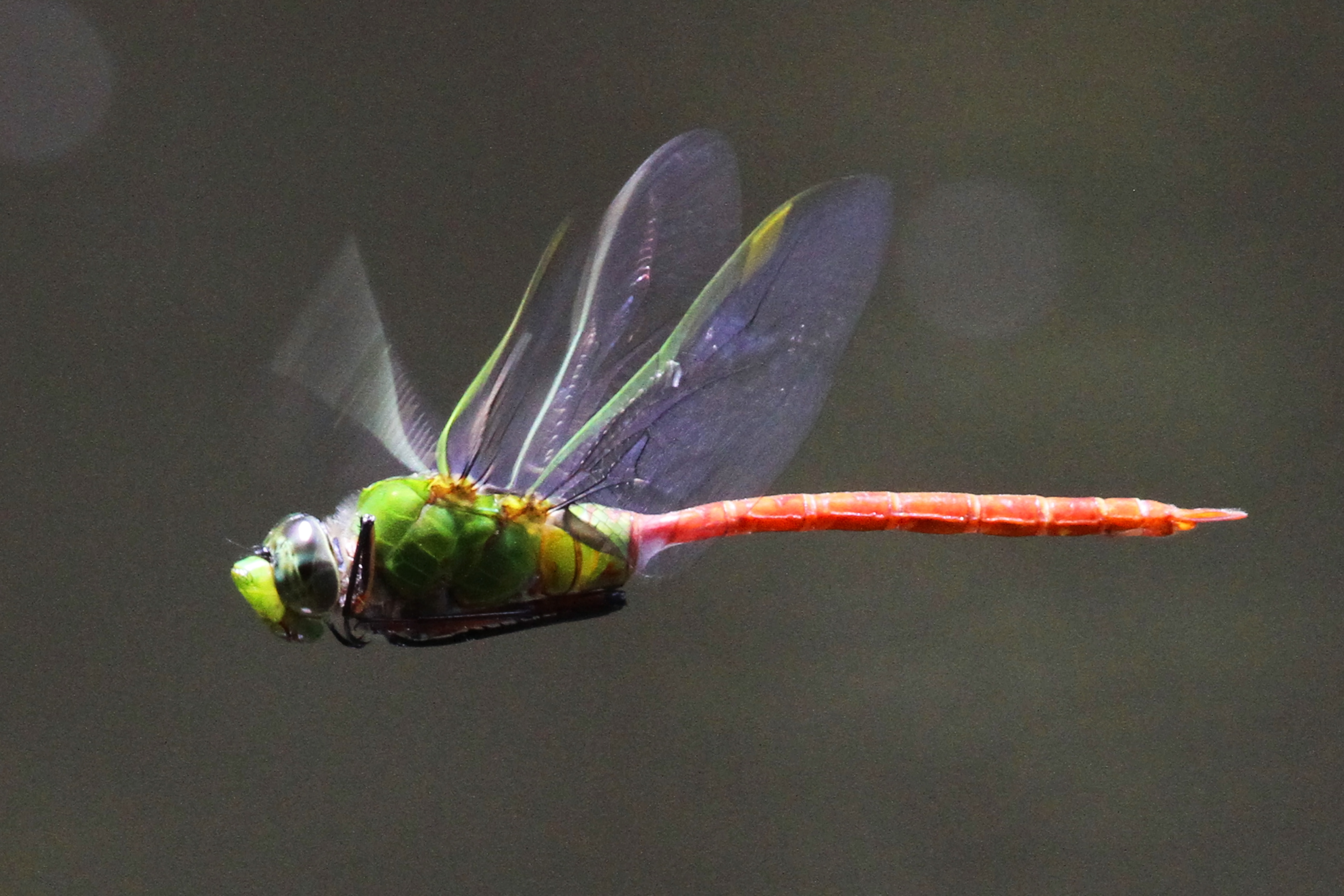
- Male

Conservation status
- Least Concern (IUCN 3.1)

Scientific classification
- Kingdom: Animalia
- Phylum: Arthropoda
- Class: Insecta
- Order: Odonata
- Infraorder: Anisoptera
- Family: Aeshnidae
- Genus: Anax
- Species: A. longipes

Binomial name
- Anax longipes Hagen, 1861

= Comet darner =

Species of insect

The comet darner (Anax longipes) is a common species of dragonfly of the family Aeshnidae.

== Description ==
The comet darner is a large dragonfly and has a green thorax and bright red abdomen. Females have a brownish abdomen patterned with blue spots.

== Distribution and habitat ==
Comet darners are found in shallow lakes and ponds which tend to have extensive beds and grasses and lack fish. They are found along the eastern United States from Missouri, Michigan, New England and some even further north.

== Conservation status ==
Its conservation status is of "least concern" according to the International Union for Conservation of Nature.
