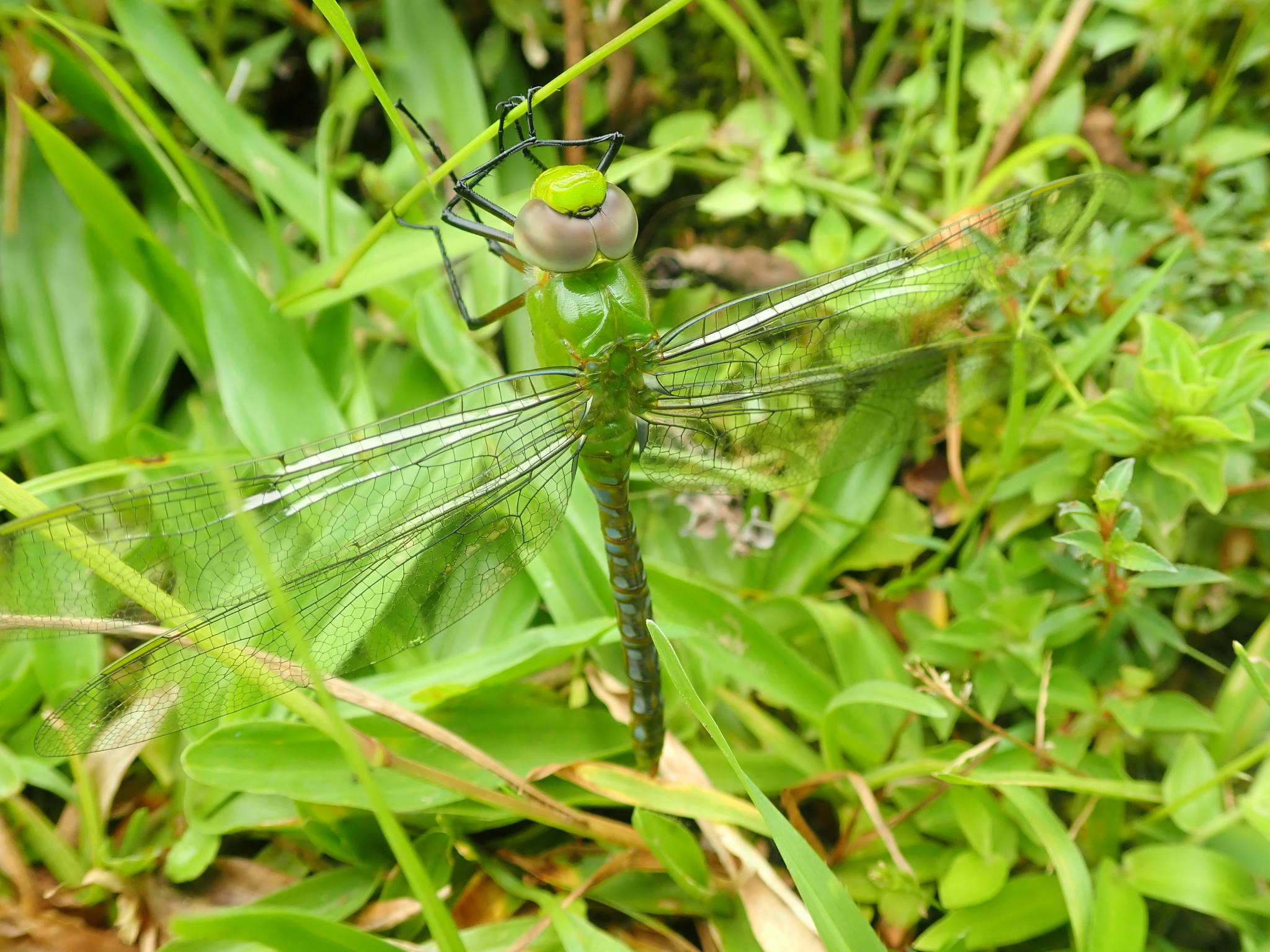

Conservation status
- Least Concern (IUCN 3.1)

Scientific classification
- Kingdom: Animalia
- Phylum: Arthropoda
- Class: Insecta
- Order: Odonata
- Infraorder: Anisoptera
- Family: Aeshnidae
- Genus: Anax
- Species: A. concolor

Binomial name
- Anax concolor Brauer, 1865

= Anax concolor =

Species of dragonfly

Anax concolor, the blue-spotted comet, is a species of darner in the dragonfly family Aeshnidae. It is found in Central America and South America.

The IUCN conservation status of Anax concolor is "LC", least concern, with no immediate threat to the species' survival. The population is stable. The IUCN status was reviewed in 2017.
