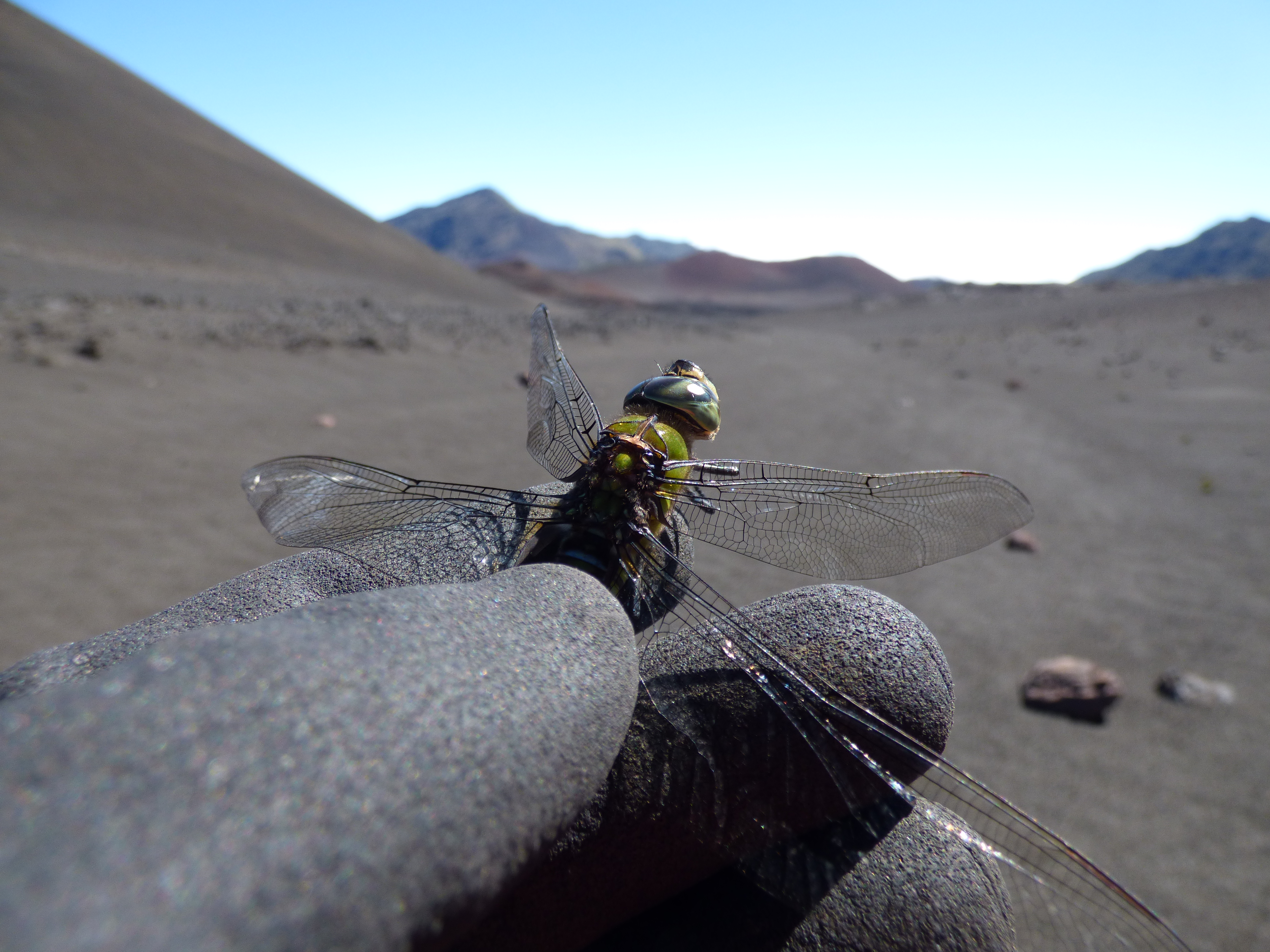

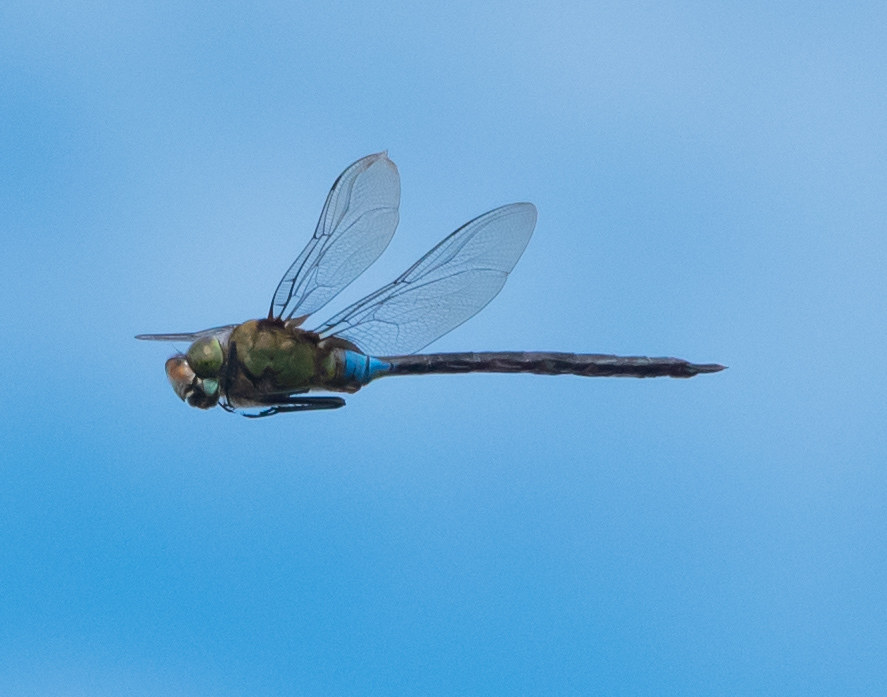

Conservation status
- Least Concern (IUCN 3.1)

Scientific classification
- Kingdom: Animalia
- Phylum: Arthropoda
- Class: Insecta
- Order: Odonata
- Infraorder: Anisoptera
- Family: Aeshnidae
- Genus: Anax
- Species: A. strenuus

Binomial name
- Anax strenuus Hagen, 1867

= Giant Hawaiian darner =

Species of dragonfly

The giant Hawaiian darner (Anax strenuus), also known as the giant Hawaiian dragonfly or pinao, is a species of dragonfly in the family Aeshnidae. It is one of two species of dragonfly that is endemic to the Hawaiian Islands (the other is Nesogonia blackburni). It is found near streams and wetlands on all islands of the archipelago and it has a wide altitude range, but is particularly common at higher elevations.

This species is one the world's largest living dragonflies and the largest in the United States. It typically has a wingspan of 127–143 mm (5.0–5.6 in), but has been verified to reach up to 152 mm (6.0 in); reports of considerably greater sizes are unverified and highly questionable. The only other member of the genus Anax in Hawaii is the closely related green darner (A. junius), but it is considerably smaller, mainly found in lowlands in Hawaii, and also found in Asia and North America.

== See also ==
- Anax walsinghami (giant darner or giant green darner), the largest dragonfly in the US mainland
- Megalagrion, a genus of damselflies found only in Hawaii
- Tetracanthagyna plagiata (giant hawker or gigantic riverhawker), an Asian species with the largest verified wingspan for a dragonfly
