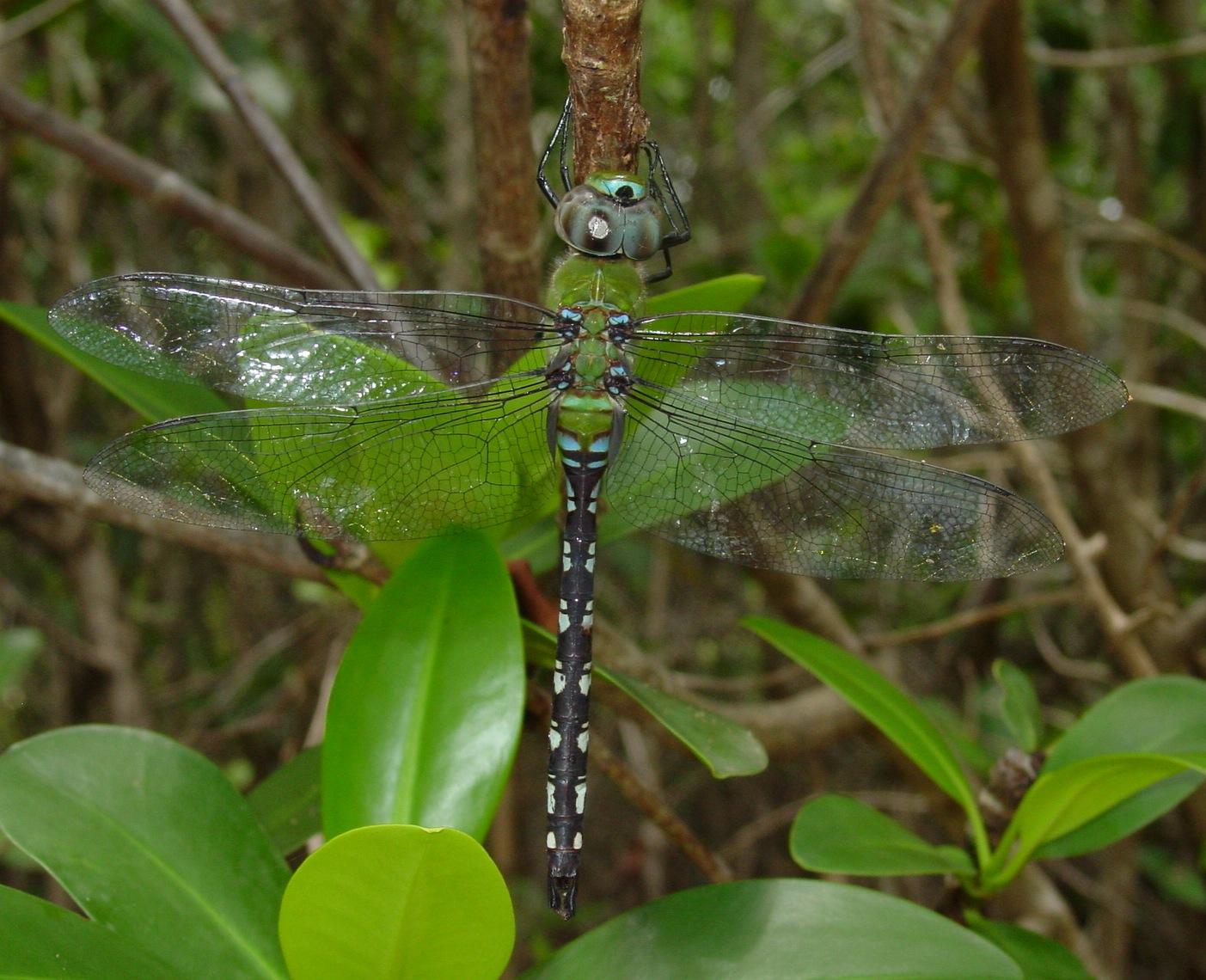

Conservation status
- Least Concern (IUCN 3.1)

Scientific classification
- Kingdom: Animalia
- Phylum: Arthropoda
- Class: Insecta
- Order: Odonata
- Infraorder: Anisoptera
- Family: Aeshnidae
- Genus: Anax
- Species: A. amazili

Binomial name
- Anax amazili (Burmeister, 1839)

Synonyms
- Aeschna amazili Burmeister, 1839; Anax maculatus Rambur, 1842

= Anax amazili =

Amazon darner

Species of dragonfly

Anax amazili, the Amazon darner, is a tropical species of dragonfly of the family Aeshnidae.

== Distribution and habitat ==
The Amazon darner is a tropical species with a wide distribution, and can be found from the southern United States southward to Argentina. It is associated with open ponds and marshes, often in temporary wetlands.

== Description ==
A fairly large dragonfly, the Amazon darner reaches between 70 and 74 millimeters in length, with hindwing measurements between 48 and 52 millimeters. The face of this dragonfly is green and is marked with a single dark triangle on the top of the frons. The abdomen is mostly brown, but the first and second abdominal segments match the green of the thorax. Large basal spots, ranging from blue to green depending on the individual, give the abdomen a ringed appearance.
