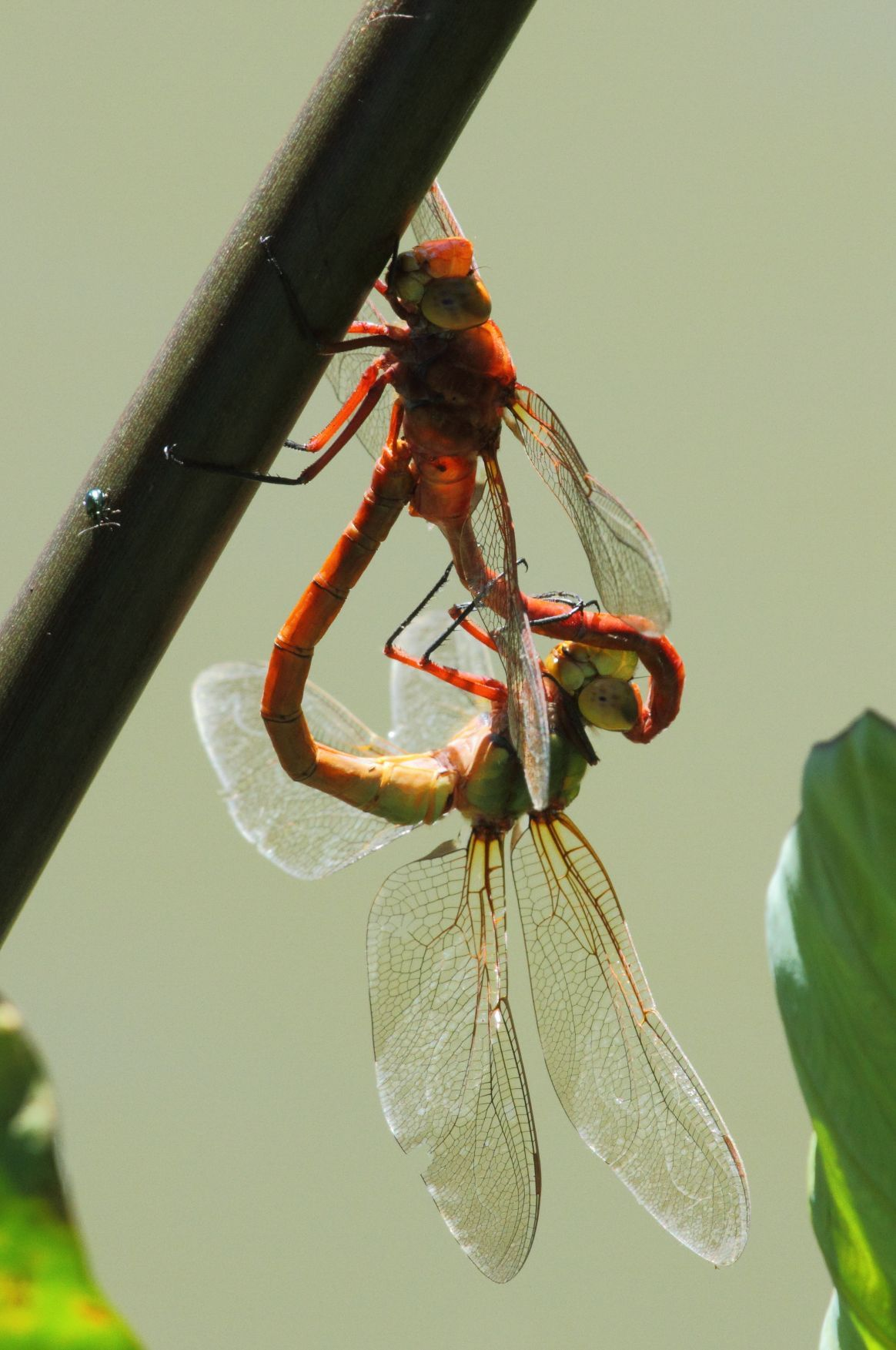
- Tandem pair

Conservation status
- Least Concern (IUCN 3.1)

Scientific classification
- Kingdom: Animalia
- Phylum: Arthropoda
- Class: Insecta
- Order: Odonata
- Infraorder: Anisoptera
- Family: Aeshnidae
- Genus: Anax
- Species: A. speratus

Binomial name
- Anax speratus Hagen, 1867

= Anax speratus =

Orange emperor

Species of dragonfly

Anax speratus, the orange emperor, is a species of dragonfly in the family Aeshnidae. It is found in Angola, Botswana, the Democratic Republic of the Congo, Ethiopia, Ghana, Kenya, Malawi, Mozambique, Namibia, Nigeria, Sierra Leone, Somalia, South Africa, Sudan, Tanzania, Togo, Uganda, Zambia, Zimbabwe, and possibly Burundi. Its natural habitats are rivers, intermittent rivers, and freshwater springs.
