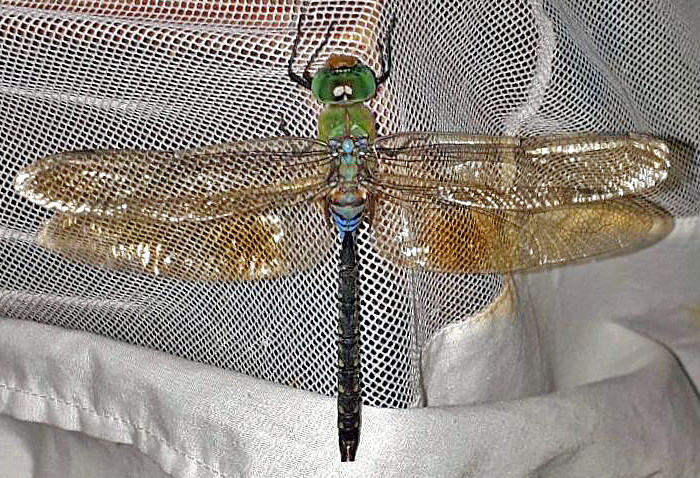
- Anax guttatus from French Polynesia. Male

Conservation status
- Least Concern (IUCN 3.1)

Scientific classification
- Kingdom: Animalia
- Phylum: Arthropoda
- Clade: Pancrustacea
- Class: Insecta
- Order: Odonata
- Infraorder: Anisoptera
- Family: Aeshnidae
- Genus: Anax
- Species: A. guttatus

Binomial name
- Anax guttatus (Burmeister, 1839)

Synonyms
- Aeschna guttata Burmeister, 1839; Anax magnus Rambur, 1842; Libellula selysii Schlegel, 1849; Anax goliathus Fraser, 1922

= Anax guttatus =

Pale-spotted emperor

Species of dragonfly

Anax guttatus, the pale-spotted emperor or lesser green emperor, is a dragonfly of the family Aeshnidae.

== Distribution ==
Anax guttatus is widespread from India to Japan and Australia and Pacific Ocean Islands. It is found in Northern Australia, Africa, Bangladesh, China (Guangdong, Guangxi, Hong Kong, Hainan), Indonesia, India, Japan, Maldives, Sri Lanka, Myanmar, Malaysia, Philippines, Peninsular Malaysia, Singapore, Thailand, Taiwan, Vietnam, Cook Islands, Fiji, French Polynesia, Marshall Islands, Micronesia, New Caledonia, Palau, Papua New Guinea, Samoa, Seychelles, Tonga and Vanuatu.

== Habitat ==
This species mainly occurs in open ponds, but also in various habitats, especially with slowly flowing or standing freshwater. It is also present in urban areas.

== Description ==
Anax guttatus is a big dragonfly with blue eyes, pale green thorax and dark brown abdomen with bright blue-green markings on the sides. It can reach a wingspan of about 11 centimetres (4.3 in) and a body length of about 8 centimetres (3.1 in). Forewings are clear, the inner-half of the hindwings is brown, while the outer-half is clear. Segment 1 and sides of segment 2 of the abdomen are pale green. The dorsum of segment 2 is blue. Segment 3 is pale green on the sides with a triangular blue spot on the dorsum. Segments 4 to 7 are with a pair of baso-lateral, postjugal, and apical spots, all in bright orange. The number of spots are lesser in segment 8 to 10. Anal appendages are dark brown; the middle of the inner margins of the superiors have a projection like a straight edged shelf. Females is similar to the male; but the brown patch on the hind-wing may pale or absent. The blue on the dorsum of segment 2 will be broken up into four by a narrow brown mid-dorsal carina and a transverse line lying midway to form a cross like mark. Anal appendages are very broad and shaped like lance head.

== Etymology ==
The genus name Anax is derived from the Greek ἄναξ (anax, "king" or "sovereign"), likely referring to the dominant behaviour of Anax imperator.

The species name guttatus is derived from the Latin gutta ("spot", "drop", or "mark") and the suffix -atus ("provided with"), referring to the large pale spots on the sides of segment 9 of the abdomen.

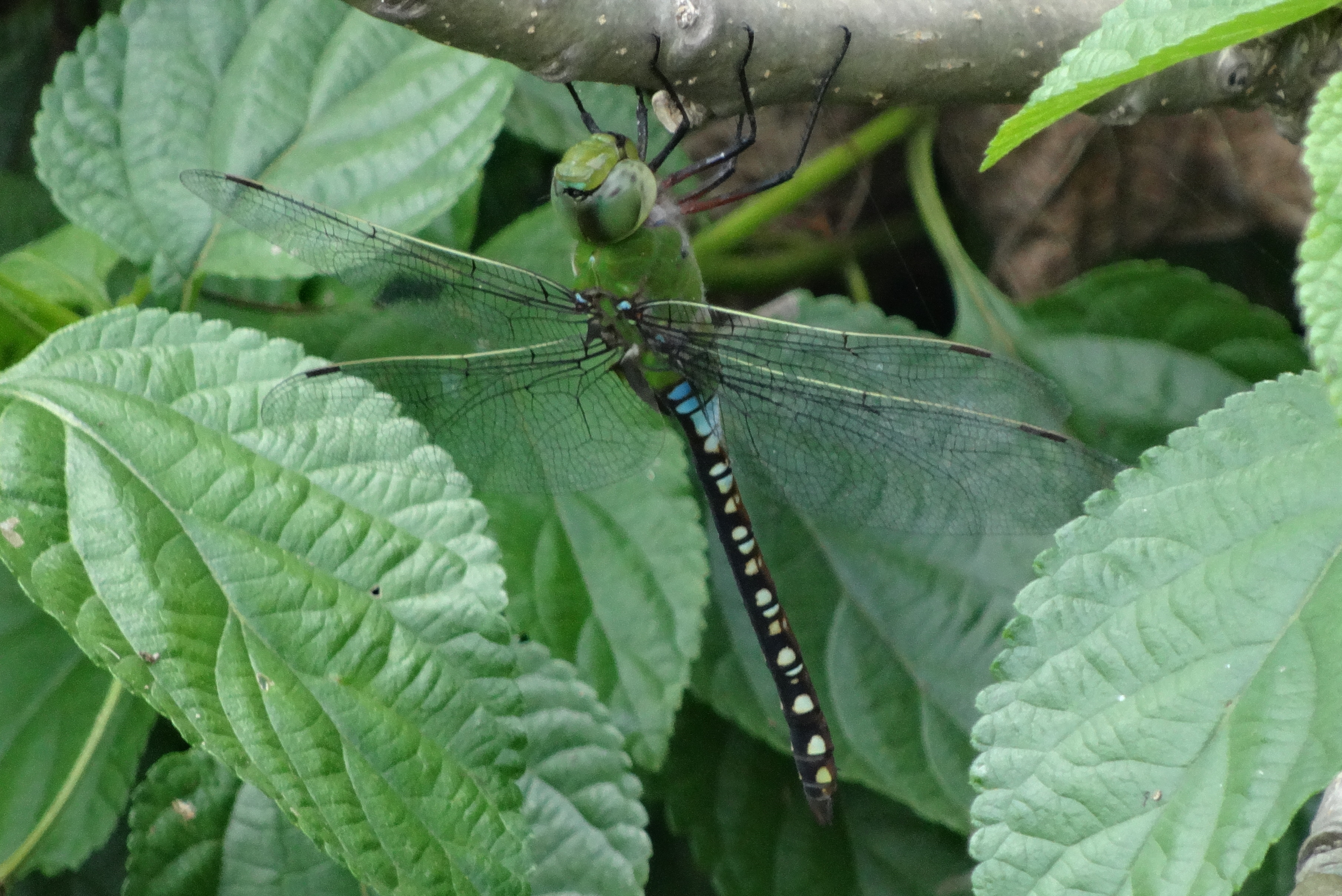
Male

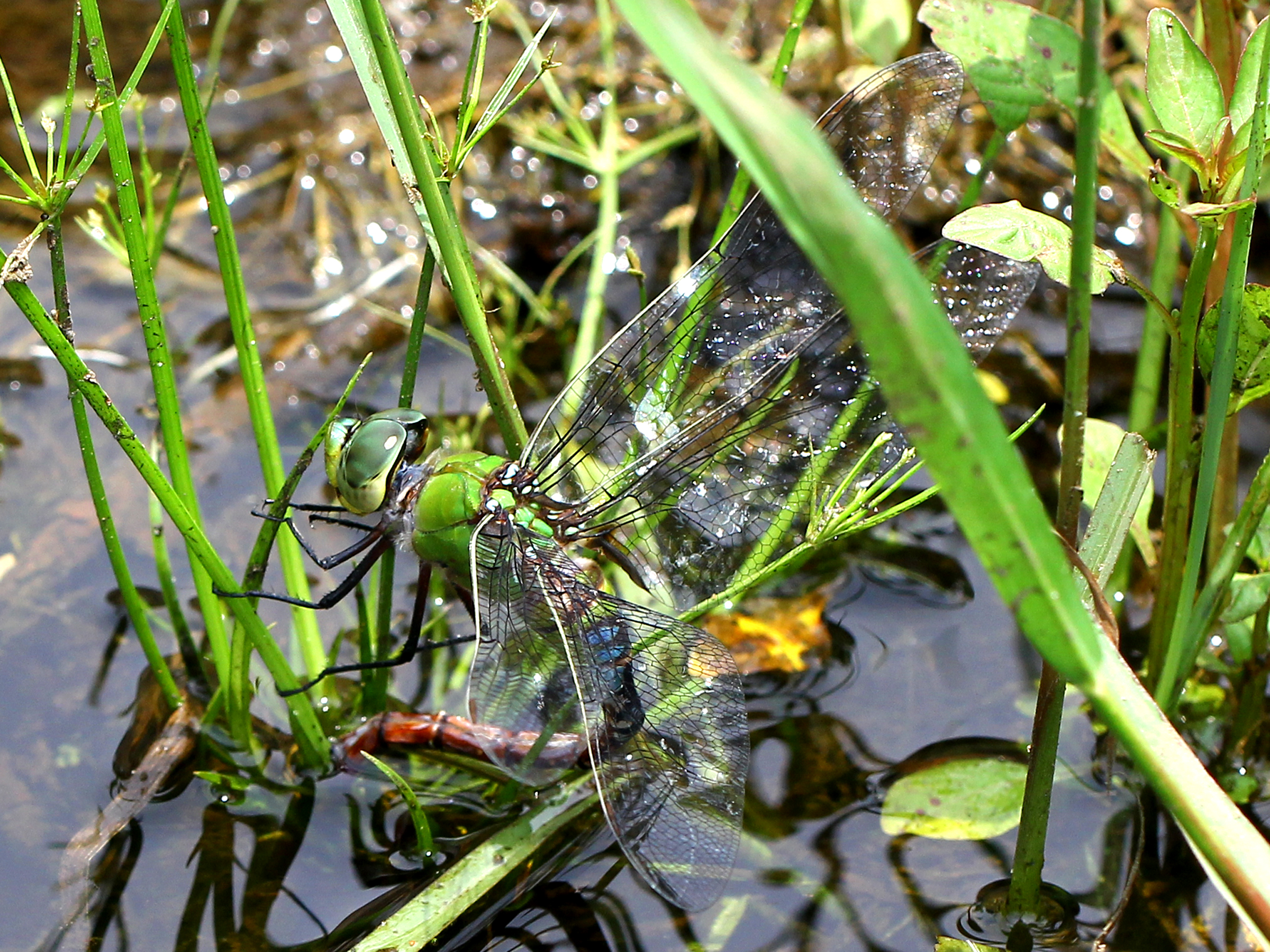
Female

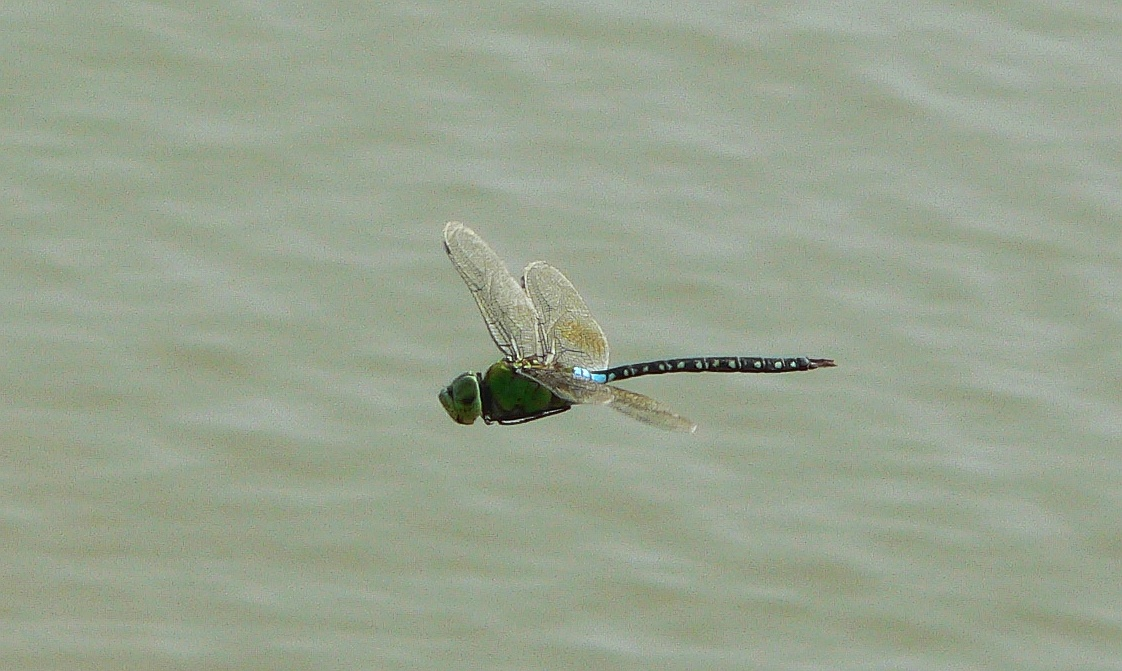
In flight

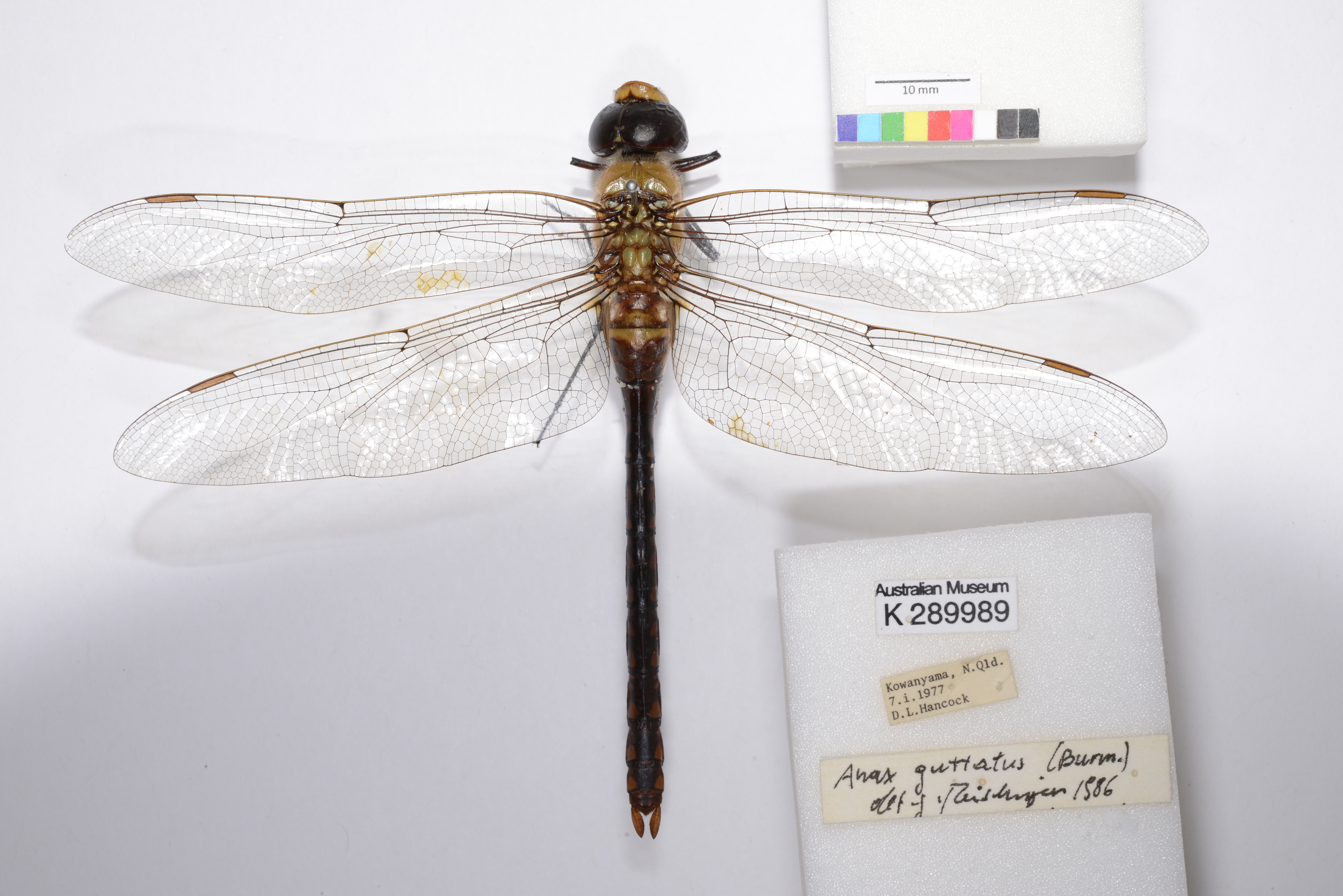
Female. Museum specimen

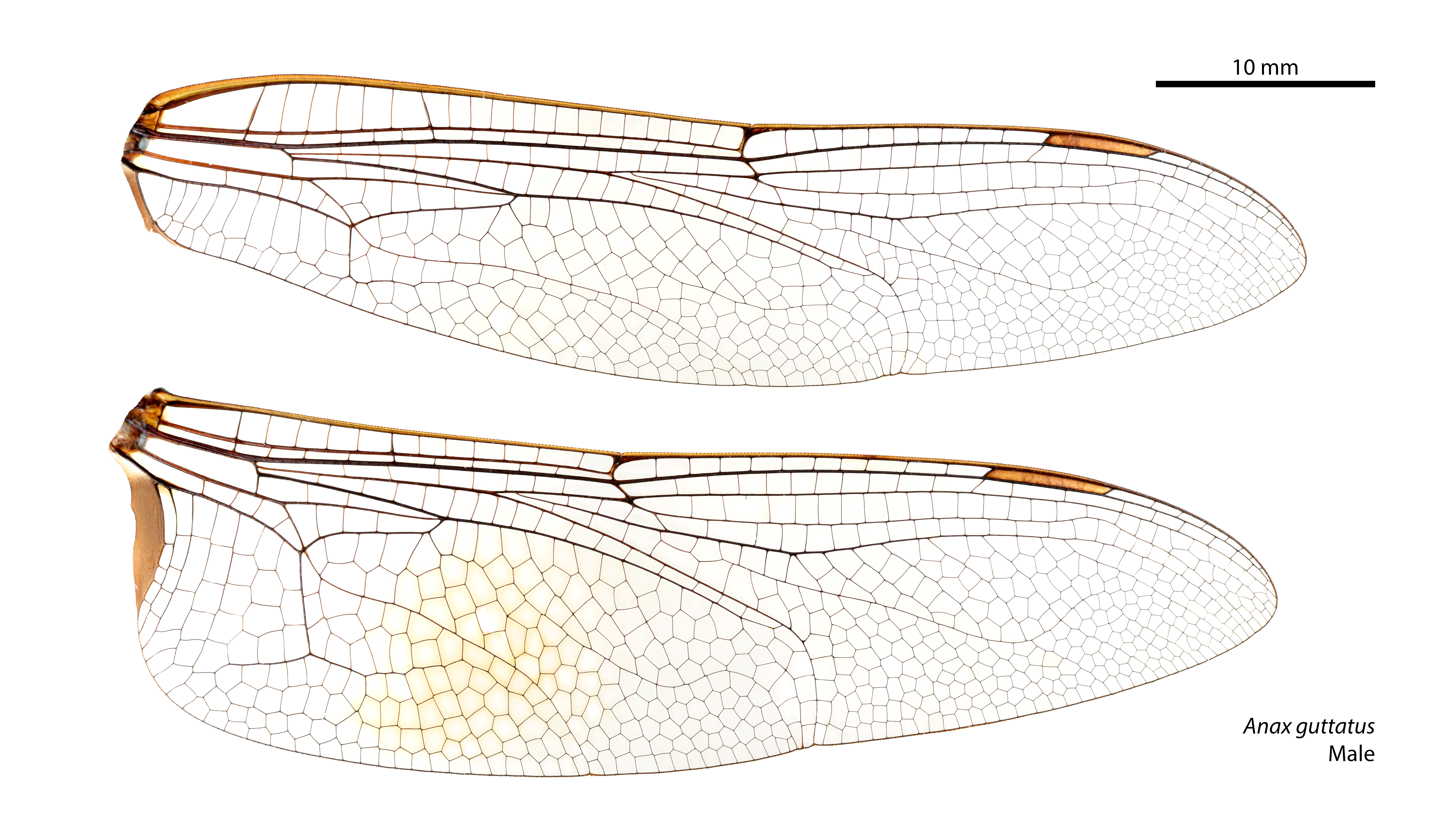
Dorsal view of the right wings of a male

== See also ==
- List of odonates of India
- List of Odonata species of Australia
- List of odonata of Kerala

== Bibliography ==
- Fraser, F. C. (1922) Indian dragonflies. Part XIV., Journal Bombay Natural History Society 28 (4): 899-910, figs. 1–3.
- Lieftinck, M.A. 1954. Handlist of Malaysian Odonata. A catalogue of the dragonflies of the Malay Peninsula, Sumatra, Java and Borneo, including the adjacent small islands. Treubia 22(Supplement): i-xiii 1-202
- Rambur, P. (1842) Histoire naturelle des insectes. Névroptères., Librairie Encyclopédique de Roret, Paris 1–534, incl. pl. 1–12.
- Watson, J.A.L. 1973. Odonata (Dragonflies). Appendix 3 pp. 1–7 fig. 1 tables 1–4 in, Alligator Rivers Region Environmental Fact-Finding Study: Entomology. Canberra : CSIRO, Division of Entomology.
- Wise, 1980: Records of South Pacific Dragonflies (Hexapoda: Odonata). Rec. Auckland Inst. Mus. 17:175-178, W&D79,
