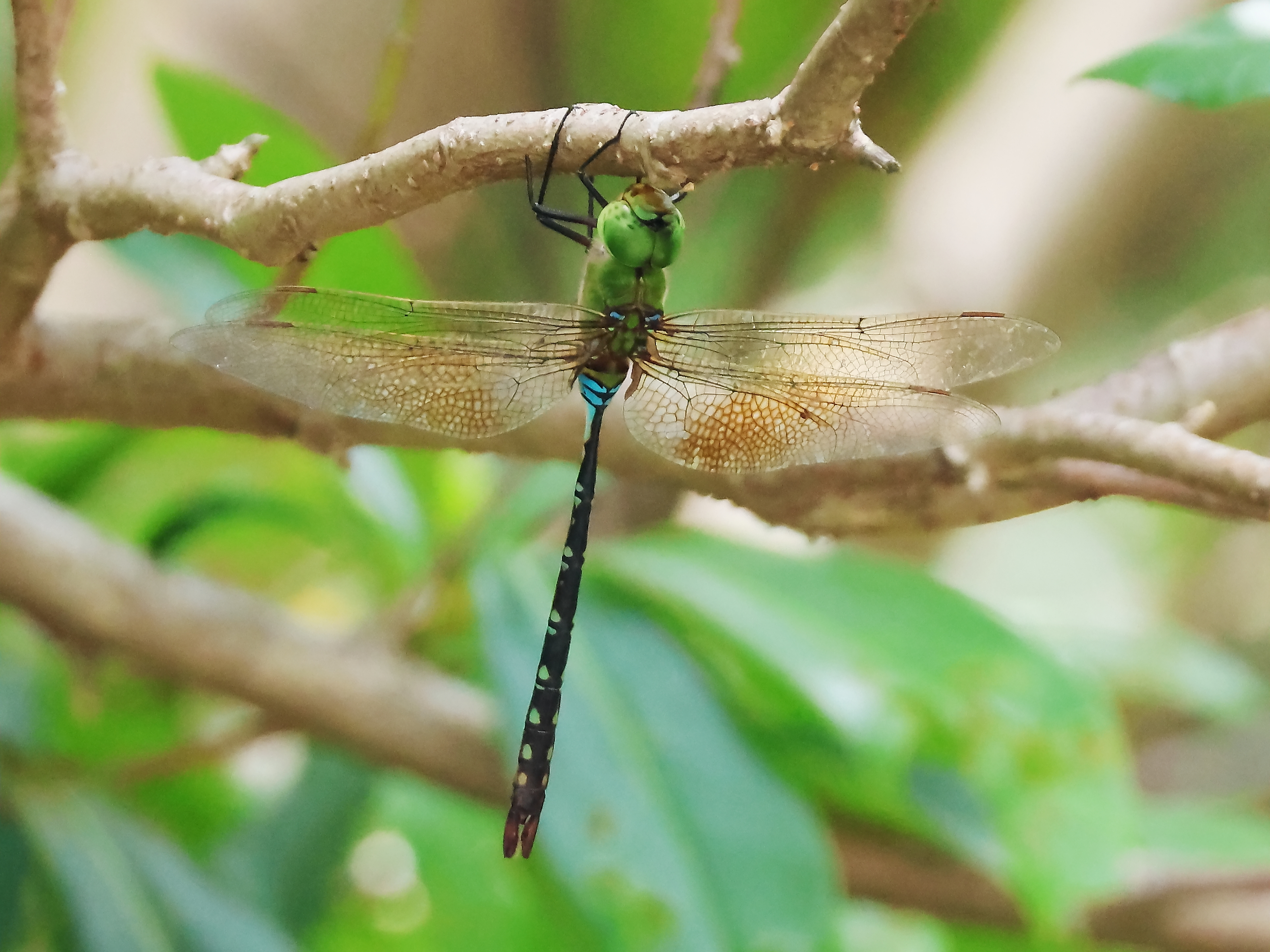
- Male, Cairns Queensland

Conservation status
- Least Concern (IUCN 3.1)

Scientific classification
- Kingdom: Animalia
- Phylum: Arthropoda
- Clade: Pancrustacea
- Class: Insecta
- Order: Odonata
- Infraorder: Anisoptera
- Family: Aeshnidae
- Genus: Anax
- Species: A. gibbosulus

Binomial name
- Anax gibbosulus Rambur, 1842

= Anax gibbosulus =

Green emperor

Species of dragonfly

Anax gibbosulus is a species of large dragonfly of the family Aeshnidae, commonly known as the green emperor. It inhabits swamps and brackish waters from India through northern Australia to the Pacific.

Anax gibbosulus is a very large dragonfly with a green body and dark brown tail with pale markings.

== Etymology ==
The genus name Anax is derived from the Greek ἄναξ (anax, "king" or "sovereign"), likely referring to the dominant behaviour of Anax imperator.

The species name gibbosulus is derived from the Latin gibbosus ("humped") and the diminutive suffix -ulus, hence "slightly humped", referring to a hump on the abdomen.

== Gallery ==
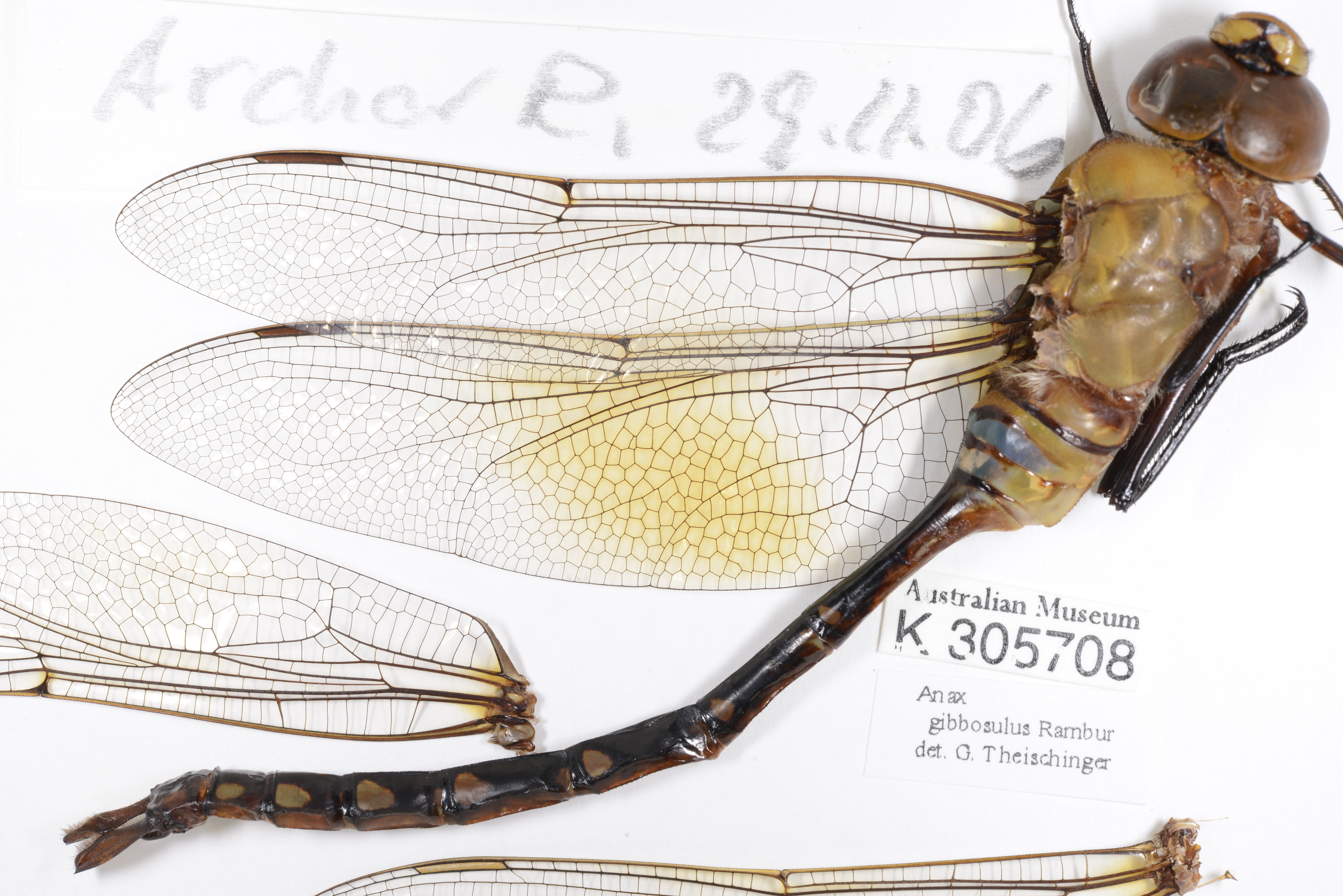
Male green emperor

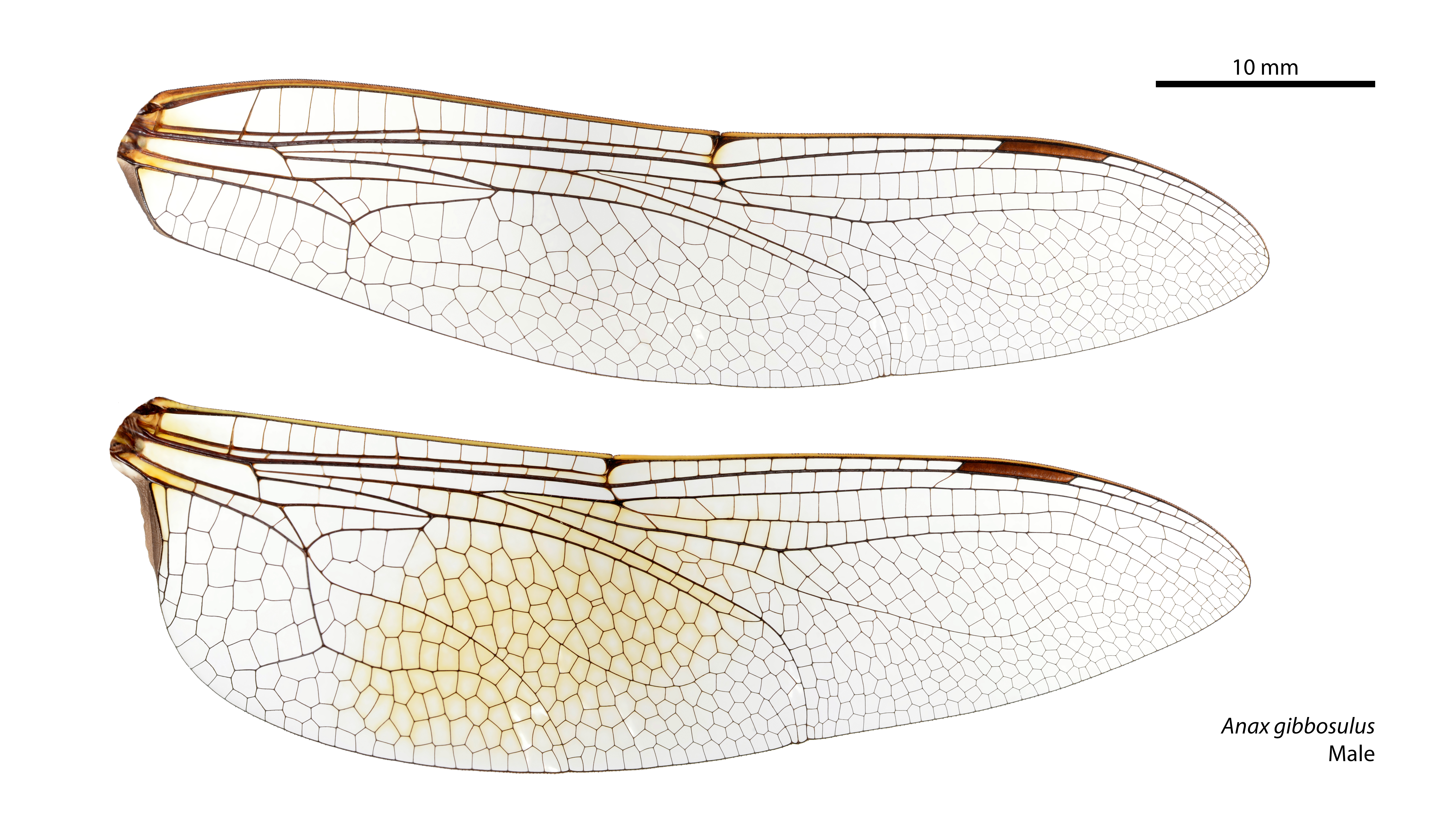
Male wings

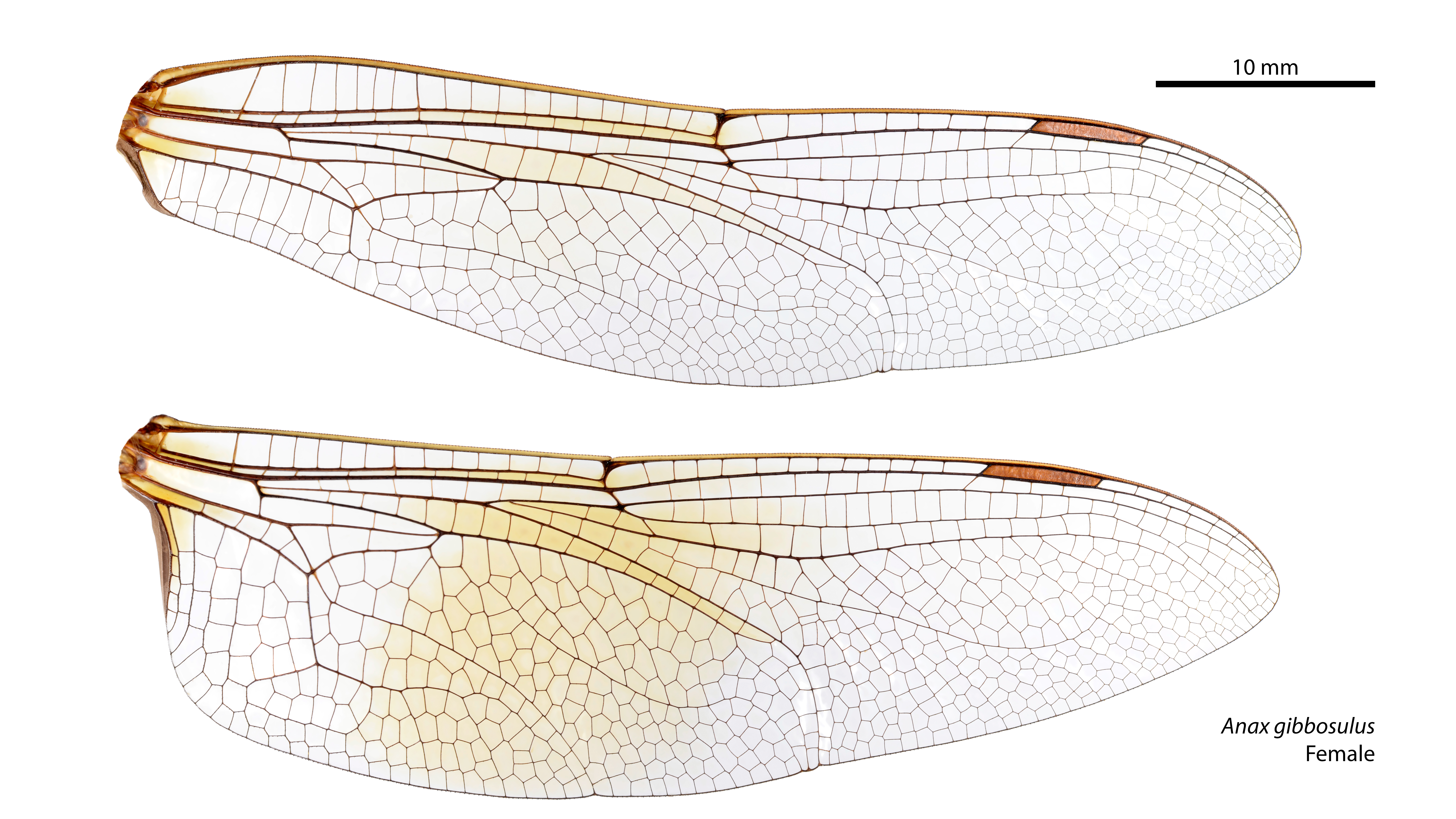
Female wings

== See also ==
- List of Odonata species of Australia
