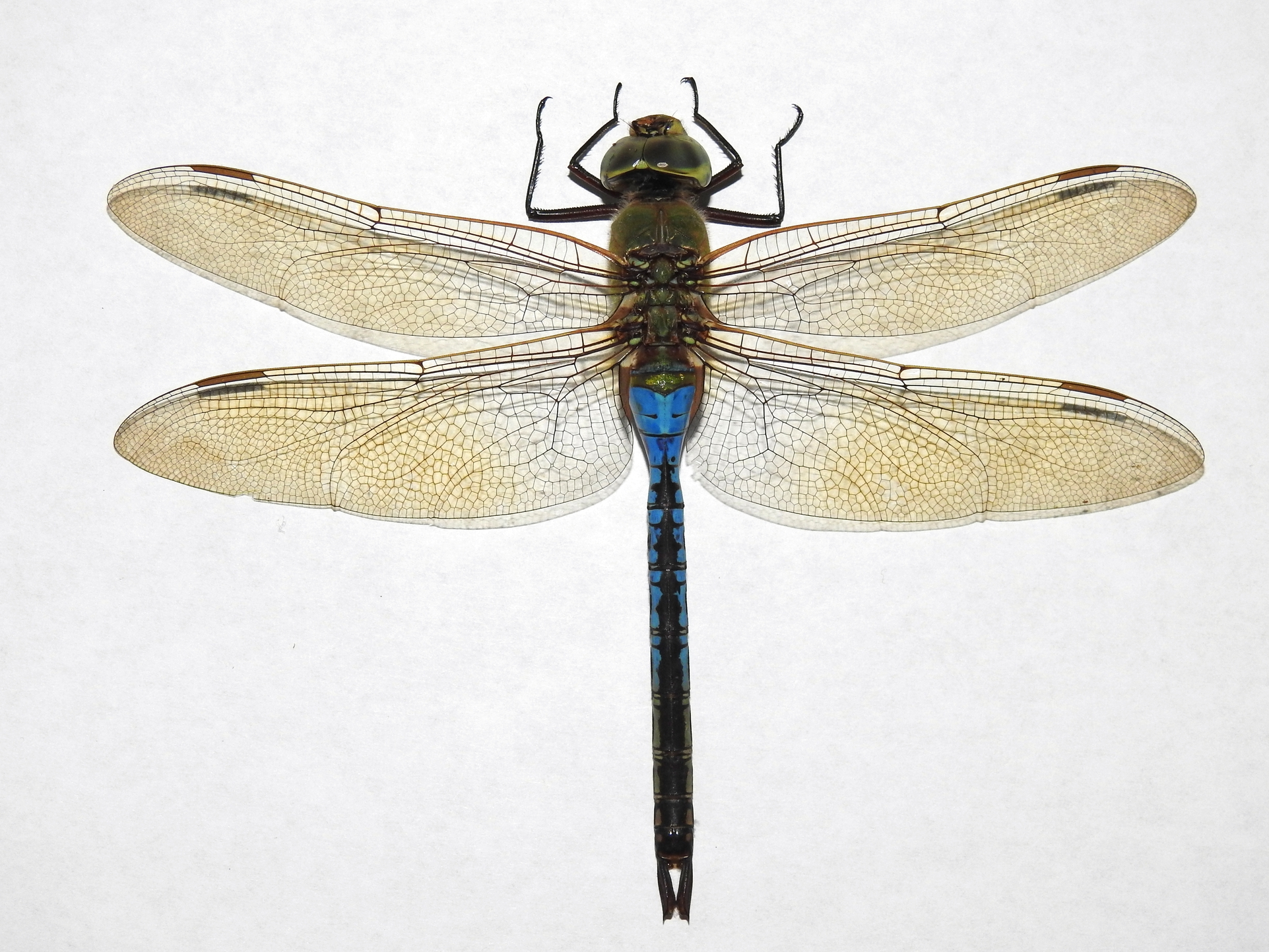
- Adult Male, Florida USA
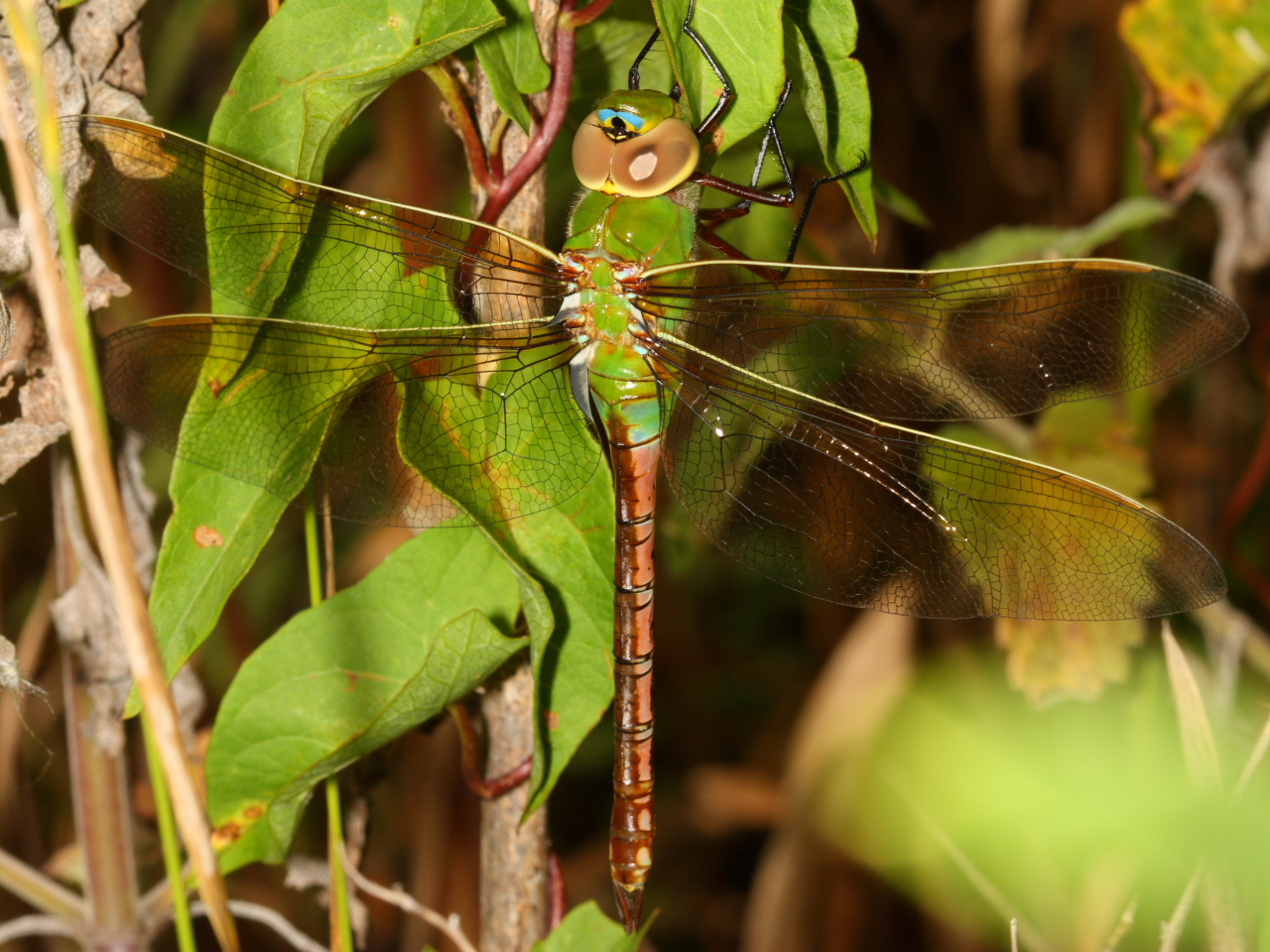
- Adult female, Blackwell Forest Preserve, Illinois

Conservation status
- Least Concern (IUCN 3.1)

Scientific classification
- Kingdom: Animalia
- Phylum: Arthropoda
- Class: Insecta
- Order: Odonata
- Infraorder: Anisoptera
- Family: Aeshnidae
- Genus: Anax
- Species: A. junius

Binomial name
- Anax junius (Drury, 1773)

Synonyms
- Libellula junia Drury, 1773; Anax spiniferus Rambur, 1842; Anax ocellatus Hagen, 1867; Anex junius (Drury); Gomphus junius (Drury, 1773); Anax severus Hagen, 1867

= Green darner =

Species of dragonfly

The green darner or common green darner (Anax junius), after its resemblance to a darning needle, is a species of dragonfly in the family Aeshnidae. One of the most common and abundant species throughout North America, it also ranges south to Panama. It is well known for its great migration distance from the northern United States south into Texas and Mexico. It also occurs in the Caribbean, Tahiti, and Asia from Japan to mainland China. It is the official insect for the state of Washington in the United States.

The green darner is a large dragonfly; males grow to 8 cm (3.1 in) in length with a wingspan up to 10 cm (4 in).

Females oviposit in aquatic vegetation, eggs laid beneath the water surface. Nymphs (naiads) are aquatic carnivores, feeding on insects, tadpoles, and small fish. Adult darners catch insects on the wing, including ant alates, moths, mosquitoes, and flies.

== Taxonomy ==
Dru Drury described this species as Libellula junius in 1773. There are not currently any recognized subspecies. There are three recognized synonyms: Anax spiniferus Rambur, 1842; Anax ocellatus Hagen, 1867; Anax severus Hagen, 1867.

== Distribution ==
Common green darners are commonly found throughout the continental United States and southern Canada, occasionally ranging as far south as Panama, particularly in the winter. There are also populations in Hawaii and the Caribbean. Vagrant individuals have been seen far outside of their normal range including sightings in Alaska, Russia, China, Japan, France, the United Kingdom, India, and Bermuda. These vagrant sightings are likely migrating individuals blown off-course by strong winds or storms.

== Characteristics ==
Common green darners are large dragonflies, ranging from 6.8 to 8 centimeters (2.7 to 3.1 in) in length and a wingspan of up to 10 centimeters (4 in). Both sexes have an unmarked green thorax. Mature males have bluish-purple abdomens (the first few abdominal segments are the brightest) with a black dorsal stripe that broadens near the end of the abdomen. Immature males and most females have reddish-brown abdomens, but some females are patterned like adult males. Wings are initially clear but usually become amber-tinted with age, especially in females. Both sexes have a black 'bulls-eye' mark on the face (more precisely, the frons) in front of their eyes, a distinguishing field mark that separates them from the superficially similar comet darner (Anax longipes). This species oviposits in tandem which is a unique behavior among North American darners.

== Natural history ==
=== Diet and predators ===
Both the adult and the nymphal stage are predators. Nymphs prey upon immature aquatic insects (including their own species), small crustaceans, small tadpoles, and small fish. Adults primarily prey on winged insects, including wasps, flies, butterflies, and other Odonates. The primary predators of common green darner nymphs are fish. Adults are preyed upon by birds and occasionally robber flies, spiders, and other large dragonflies.

=== Habitat ===
Nymphs develop in lakes, ponds, and slow streams and rivers. Adults are most frequently seen around nymph habitat but they are strong fliers and can be found in a wide variety of habitats including grasslands, forests, and urban areas.

=== Migration ===
There are several species of migratory dragonflies in North America, but common green darners are the best studied. Other migratory species include:

- Tramea lacerata (black saddlebags)
- Pantala flavescens (wandering glider)
- Pantala hymenea (spot-winged glider)
- Sympetrum corruptum (variegated meadowhawk)

The large geographic range and migratory behavior of the common green darner has made it a challenge to piece together its complex life history. Recent research has indicated that the annual life cycle of Anax junius is likely composed of at least three different generations. The first generation emerges in the southern end of its range in early spring and migrates northwards through spring and summer. The second generation emerges in the northern end of its range in summer and migrates southwards in fall. The third generation occurs in the south during the winter and does not migrate. Common green darners migrate in fall and spring but for several reasons the southward movement in fall is more noticeable.

By attaching micro-radio transmitters to common green darners, researchers have found them to be capable of migrating up to 140 kilometers (87 mi) in a day, though they typically cover less distance per day. A group of researchers used stable isotope analysis on individuals collected between Ontario and Mexico during fall and documented that >90% of individuals moved southward, with an average distance of 900 kilometers.

A study published in 2019 attached miniaturized radio transmitters to common green darners in the Great Lakes region and tracked their movement with the Motus Wildlife Tracking System. Individuals moved at an average groundspeed of 16 kilometers per hour (9.9 mph).

== Gallery ==
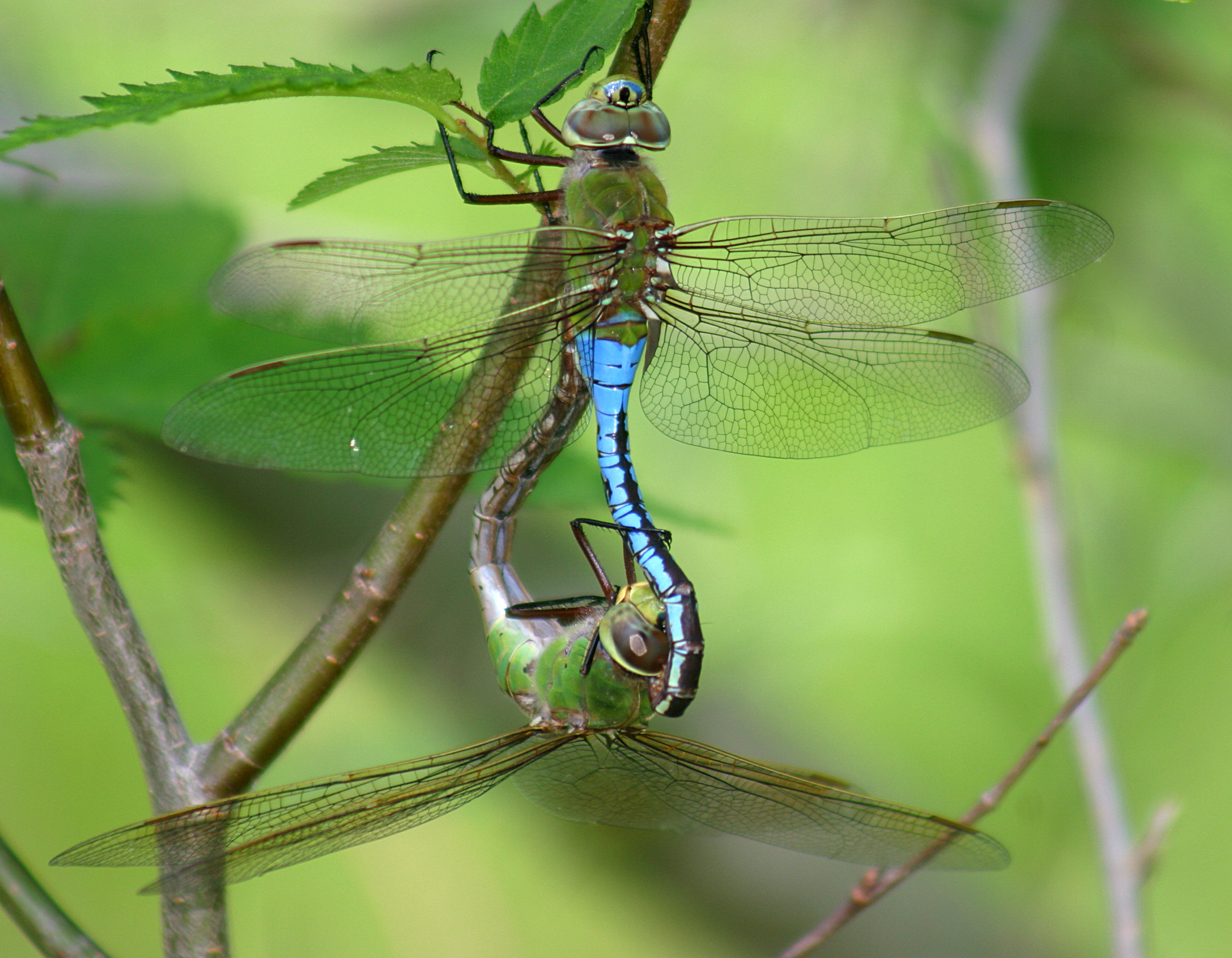
Mating, wheel position

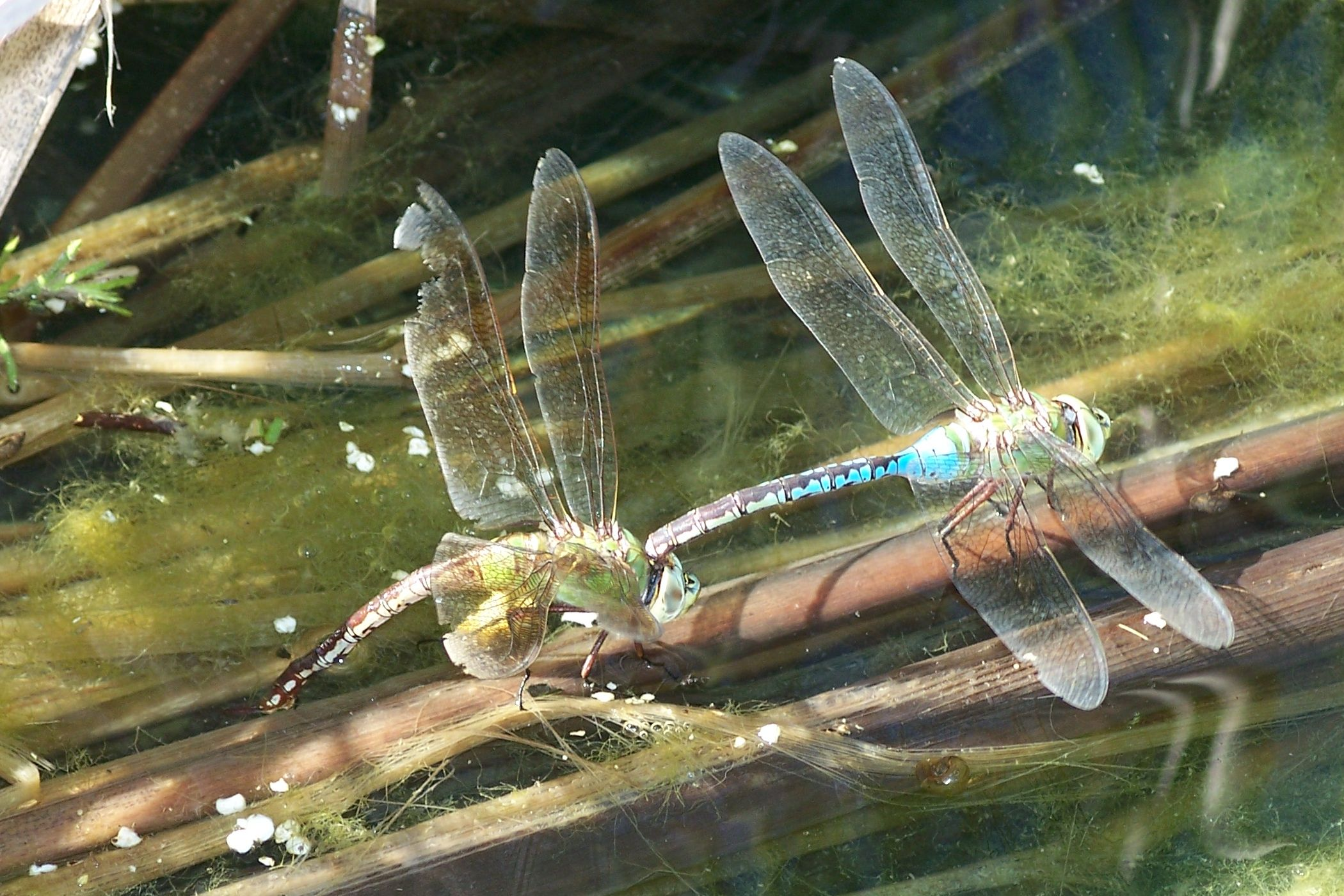
Egg-laying

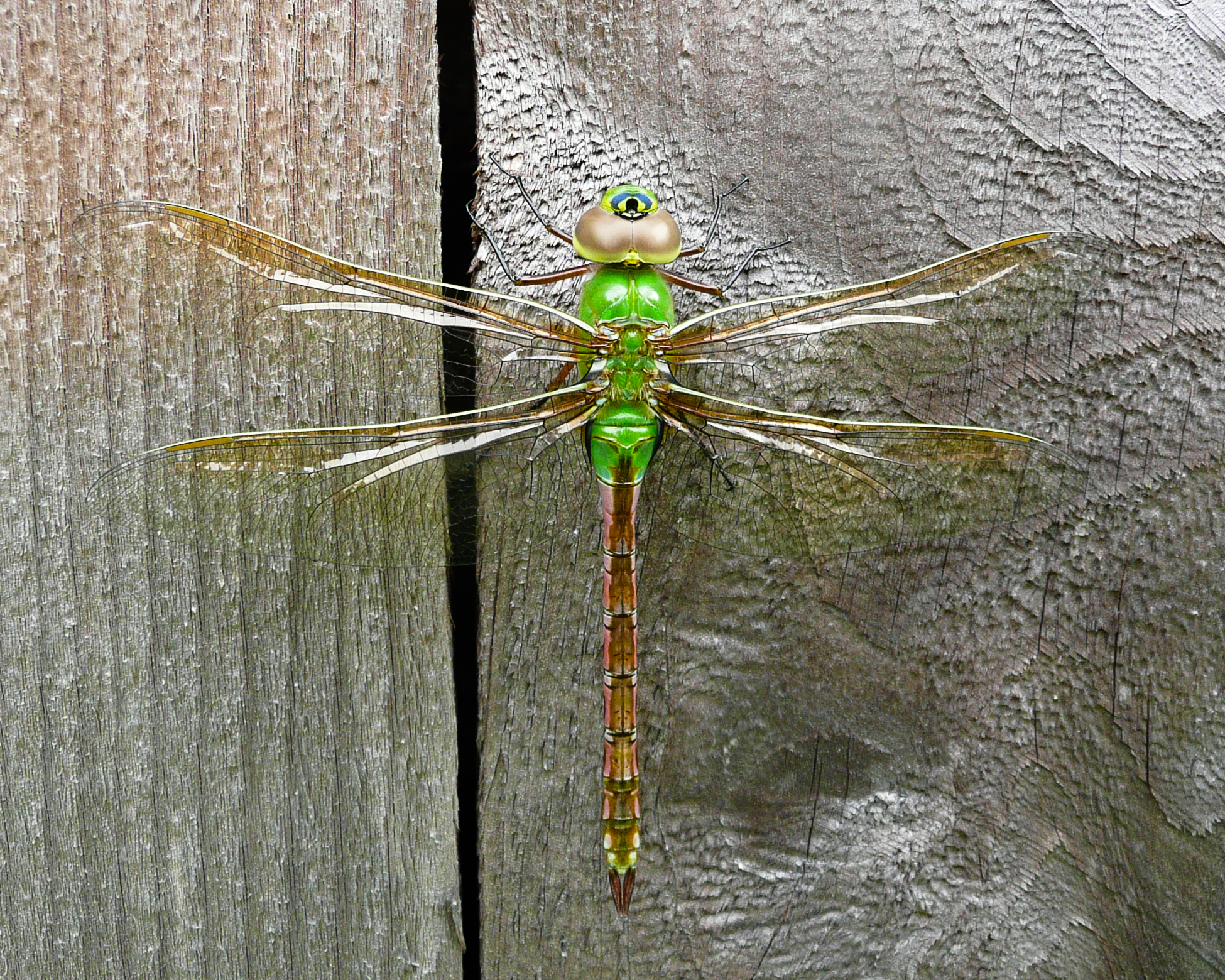
Female

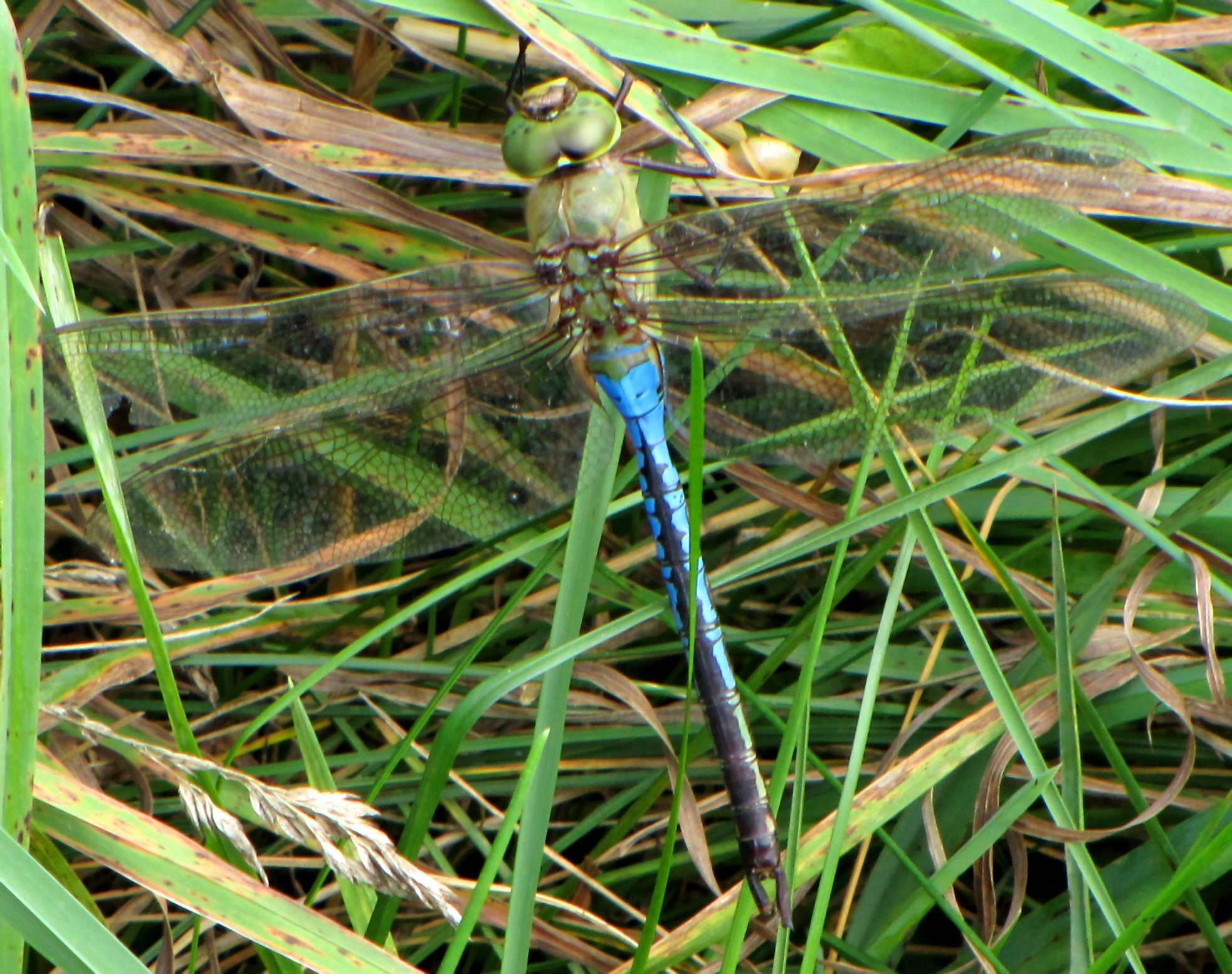
Uncommon blue form female, Ottawa, Canada

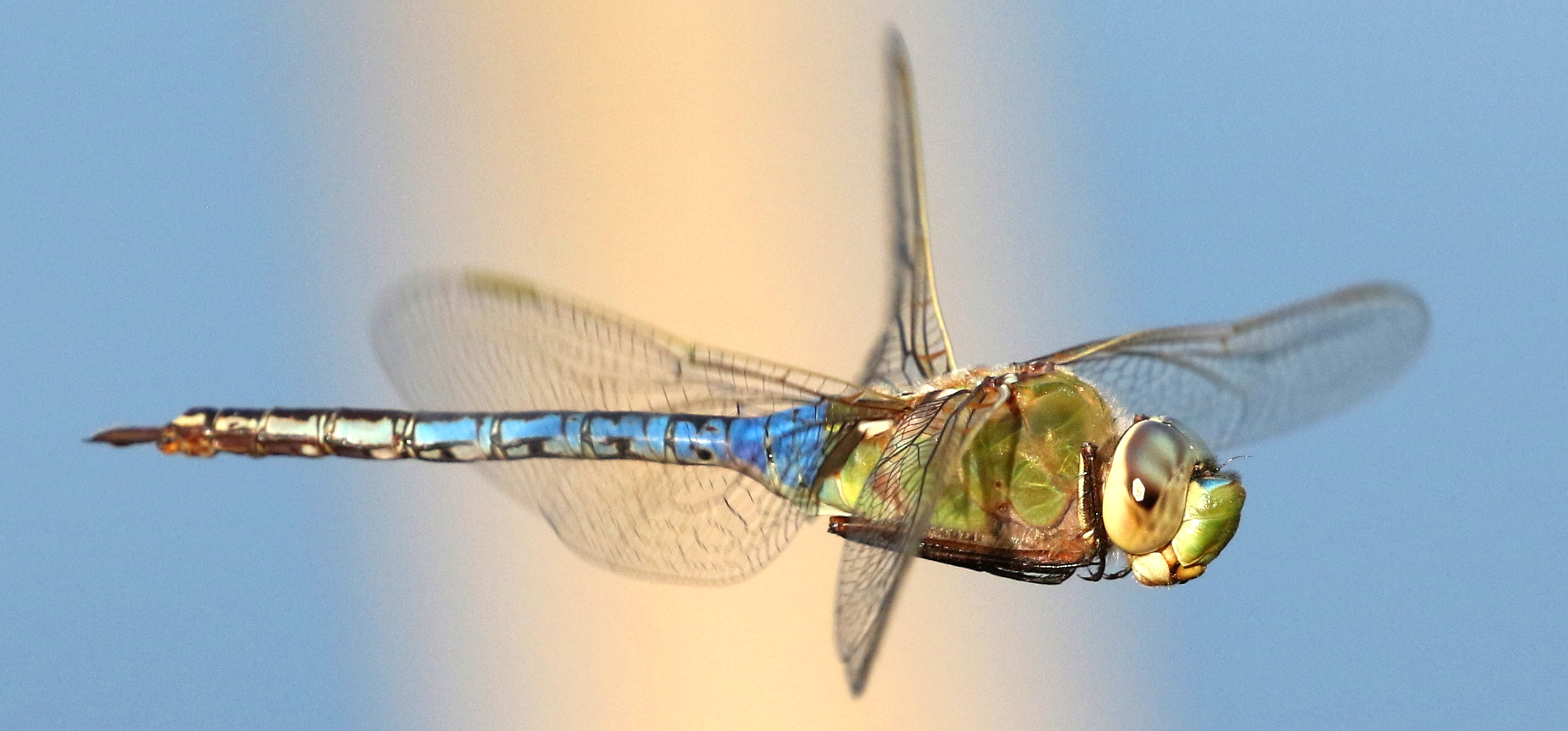
Hovering San Joaquin Wildlife Sanctuary
