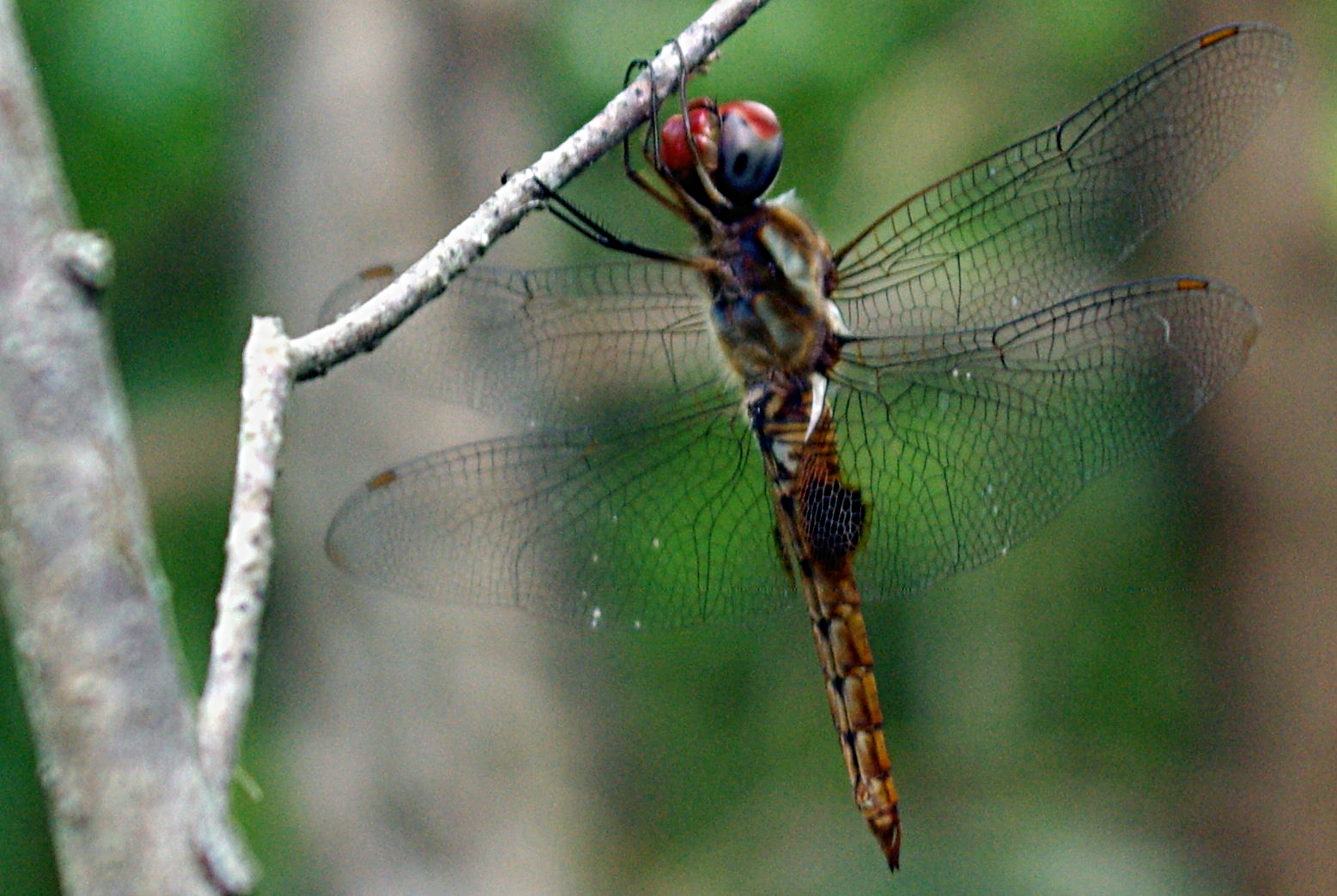
- Pantala hymenaea

Scientific classification
- Kingdom: Animalia
- Phylum: Arthropoda
- Clade: Pancrustacea
- Class: Insecta
- Order: Odonata
- Infraorder: Anisoptera
- Family: Libellulidae
- Subfamily: Trameinae
- Tribe: Trameini
- Genus: Pantala; Hagen, 1861

= Pantala =

Genus of dragonflies

Pantala is a genus of dragonfly in the family Libellulidae commonly called the rainpool gliders. They are found almost worldwide. Species of Pantala are medium-sized to large, dull orange-yellow dragonflies.

== Etymology ==
The genus name Pantala is derived from the Greek πάντες (pantes, "all") and ἄλη (alē, "wandering" or "roaming"), referring to its widespread distribution and vagrant behaviour.

== Species ==
The genus Pantala includes the following species:

Male	Female	Scientific name	Common name	Distribution
		Pantala flavescens (Fabricius, 1798)	Wandering Glider	Cosmopolitan
		Pantala hymenaea (Say, 1840)	Spot-winged Glider	North, Central and South America
