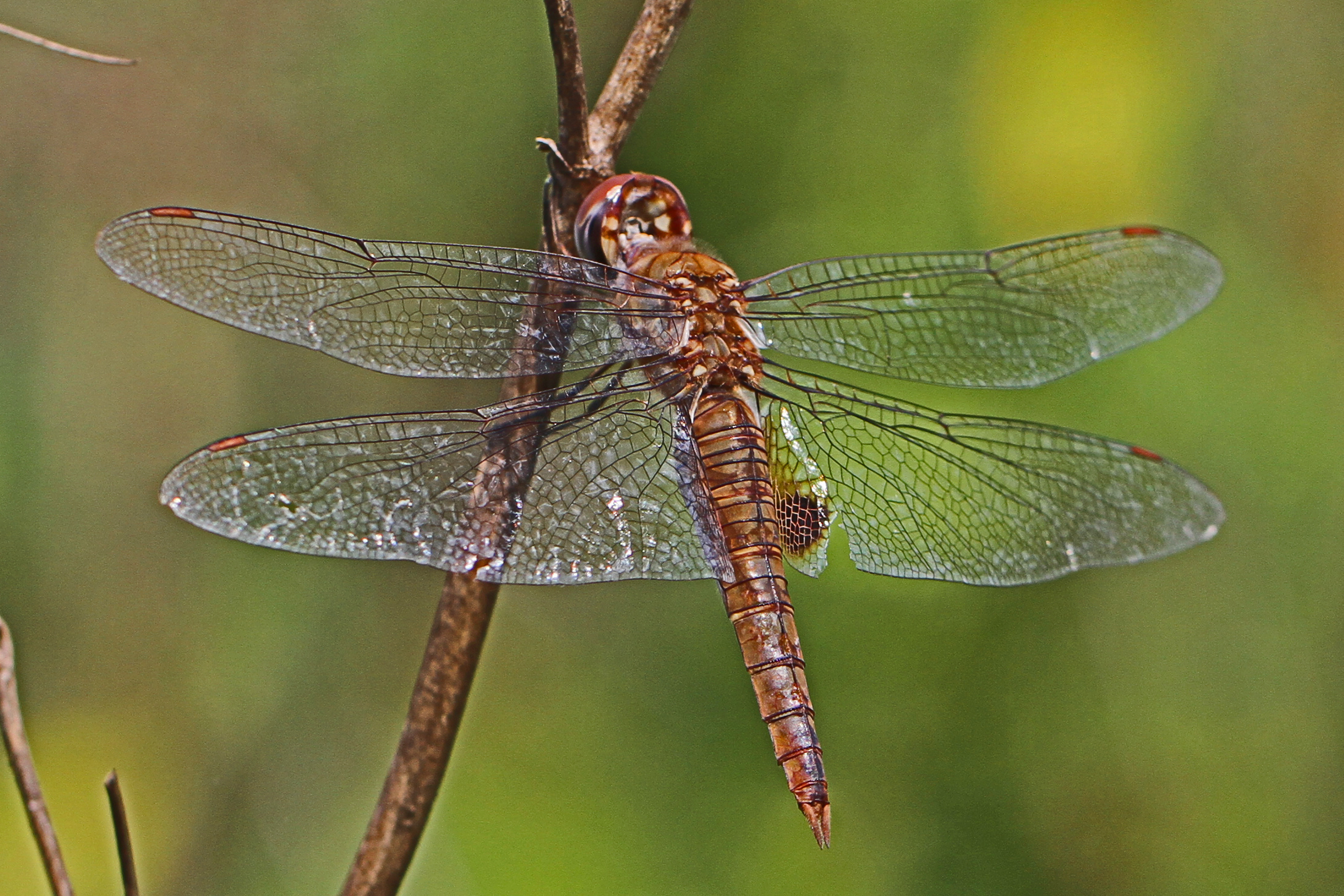

Conservation status
- Least Concern (IUCN 3.1)

Scientific classification
- Kingdom: Animalia
- Phylum: Arthropoda
- Clade: Pancrustacea
- Class: Insecta
- Order: Odonata
- Infraorder: Anisoptera
- Superfamily: Libelluloidea
- Family: Libellulidae
- Genus: Pantala
- Species: P. hymenaea

Binomial name
- Pantala hymenaea (Say, 1839)

= Pantala hymenaea =

Spot-winged glider

Species of dragonfly

Pantala hymenaea (spot-winged glider) is a dragonfly of the family Libellulidae. It is a migratory species and is native to North, Central and South America, travelling widely and breeding in temporary water bodies. It looks very similar to the wandering glider, with the addition of a dark basal spot on the hindwing. It is a common species with a very large range and the International Union for Conservation of Nature has listed it as being of "least concern".

== Description ==
P. hymenaea, otherwise known as the spot-winged glider, is a robust species with a cylindrical abdomen and broad hindwings. Its length is about 5 cm (2 in) and its wingspan 7.5 cm (3 in). The eyes are red and the face is also red in breeding males. The general body color is brown, and females and immatures have a diagonal white marking on the thorax. There is a small dark brown spot at the base of the hindwings which distinguishes this species from the otherwise similar wandering glider (Pantala flavescens).

== Distribution and habitat ==
The spot-winged glider is a widespread and common species in the New World, occurring in North, Central and South America. Its range includes six provinces in Canada (British Columbia, Manitoba, New Brunswick, Nova Scotia, Ontario and Québec), 45 states in the United States, 24 states in Mexico, the West Indies, and Central and much of South America, extending as far south as Argentina. It is a migratory species and a strong flier.

== Life history ==
=== Mating ===
The species likely breeds in all occupied territory, with the exception of British Columbia and Manitoba, where it is probably a vagrant. Breeding takes place in temporary wetlands, flooded areas, pools and garden ponds. The most important factor for successful breeding is likely the absence of fish, as the nymphs feed in the open.

== Food resources ==
The spot-winged glider is a known predator of Anopheles freeborni, the western malaria mosquito. It primarily feeds on A. freeborni at dusk, during which the mosquitoes commonly swarm. As it gets darker, predation decreases due to the importance of visual stimuli in the ability of P. hymenaea to detect its prey.

== Ecology ==
In North America, there is a northward migration of these dragonflies from tropical areas in the summer, and a southerly migration in the fall; presumably these are a different generation, but the biology of this species is little known.
