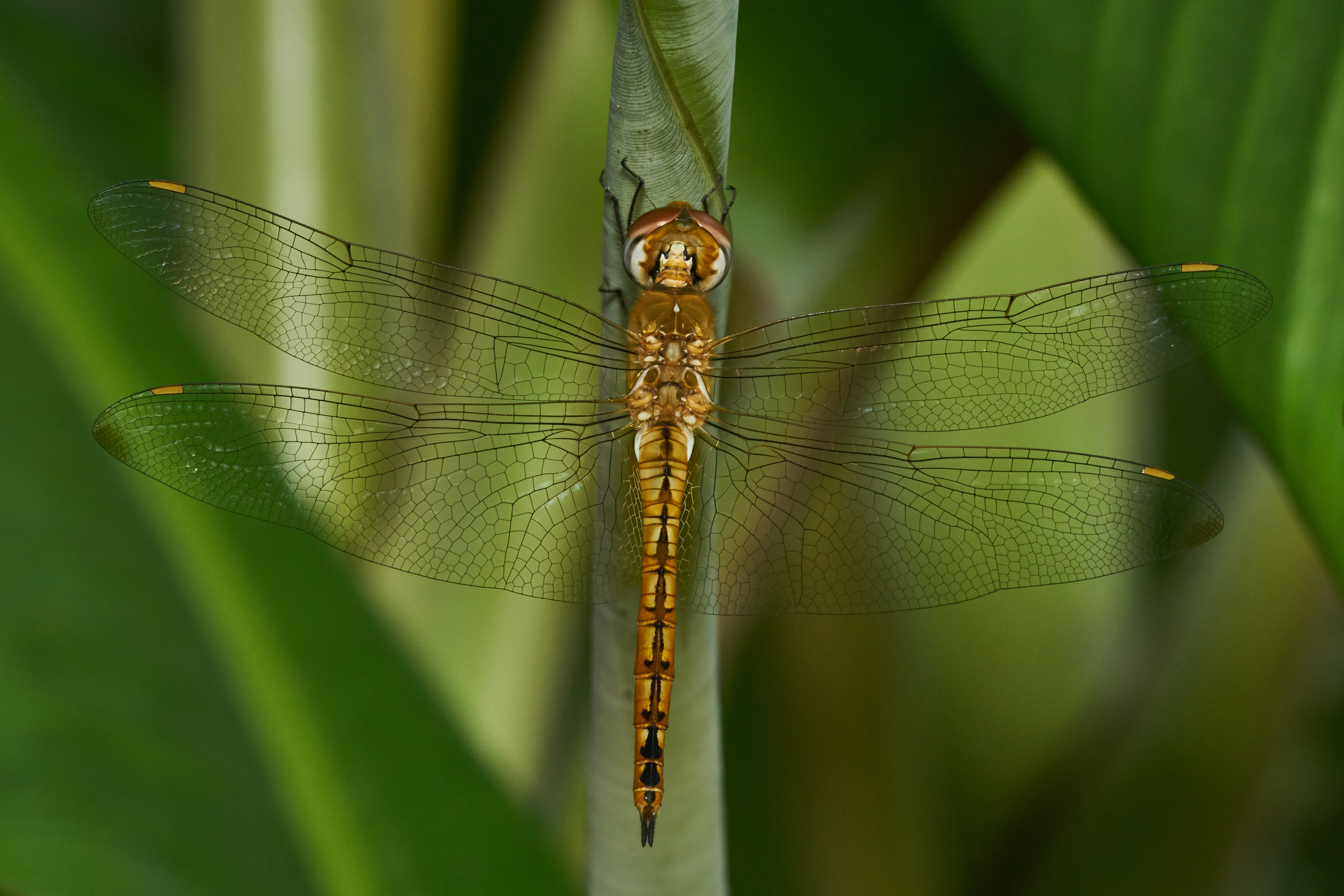
- male, Kerala, India
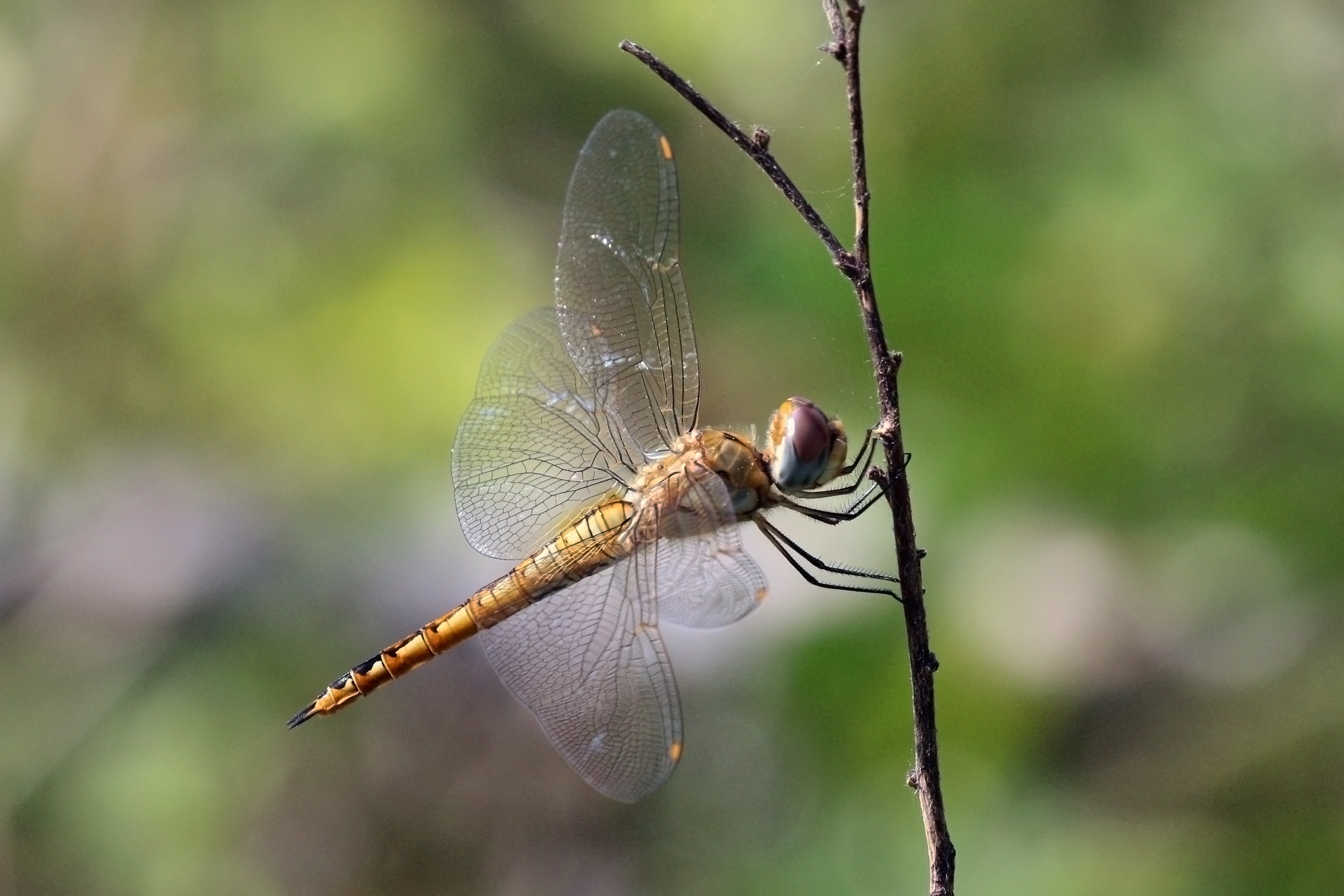
- female, Grand Cayman, Cayman Islands

Conservation status
- Least Concern (IUCN 3.1)

Scientific classification
- Kingdom: Animalia
- Phylum: Arthropoda
- Clade: Pancrustacea
- Class: Insecta
- Order: Odonata
- Infraorder: Anisoptera
- Superfamily: Libelluloidea
- Family: Libellulidae
- Genus: Pantala
- Species: P. flavescens

Binomial name
- Pantala flavescens (Fabricius, 1798)
- Distribution of Pantala flavescens

Synonyms
- Libellula flavescens Fabricius, 1798; Libellula viridula Palisot de Beauvois, 1807; Libellula sparshallii Curtis, 1829; Libellula analis Burmeister, 1839; Libellula terminalis Burmeister, 1839; Orthetrum mathewi Singh & Baijal, 1955; Sympetrum tandicola Singh, 1955

= Pantala flavescens =

Species of dragonfly

Pantala flavescens, the globe skimmer, globe wanderer or wandering glider, is a wide-ranging dragonfly of the family Libellulidae. This species and Pantala hymenaea, the "spot-winged glider", are the only members of the genus Pantala. It was first described by Johan Christian Fabricius in 1798. It is considered to be the most widespread dragonfly on the planet, with good populations on every continent except Antarctica, although rare in Europe. Globe skimmers make an annual multigenerational journey of some 18,000 km (about 11,200 miles); to complete the migration, individual globe skimmers fly more than 6,000 km (3,730 miles); one of the farthest known migrations of all insect species.

== Characteristics ==
=== Structure of the adult ===
Sexual dimorphism

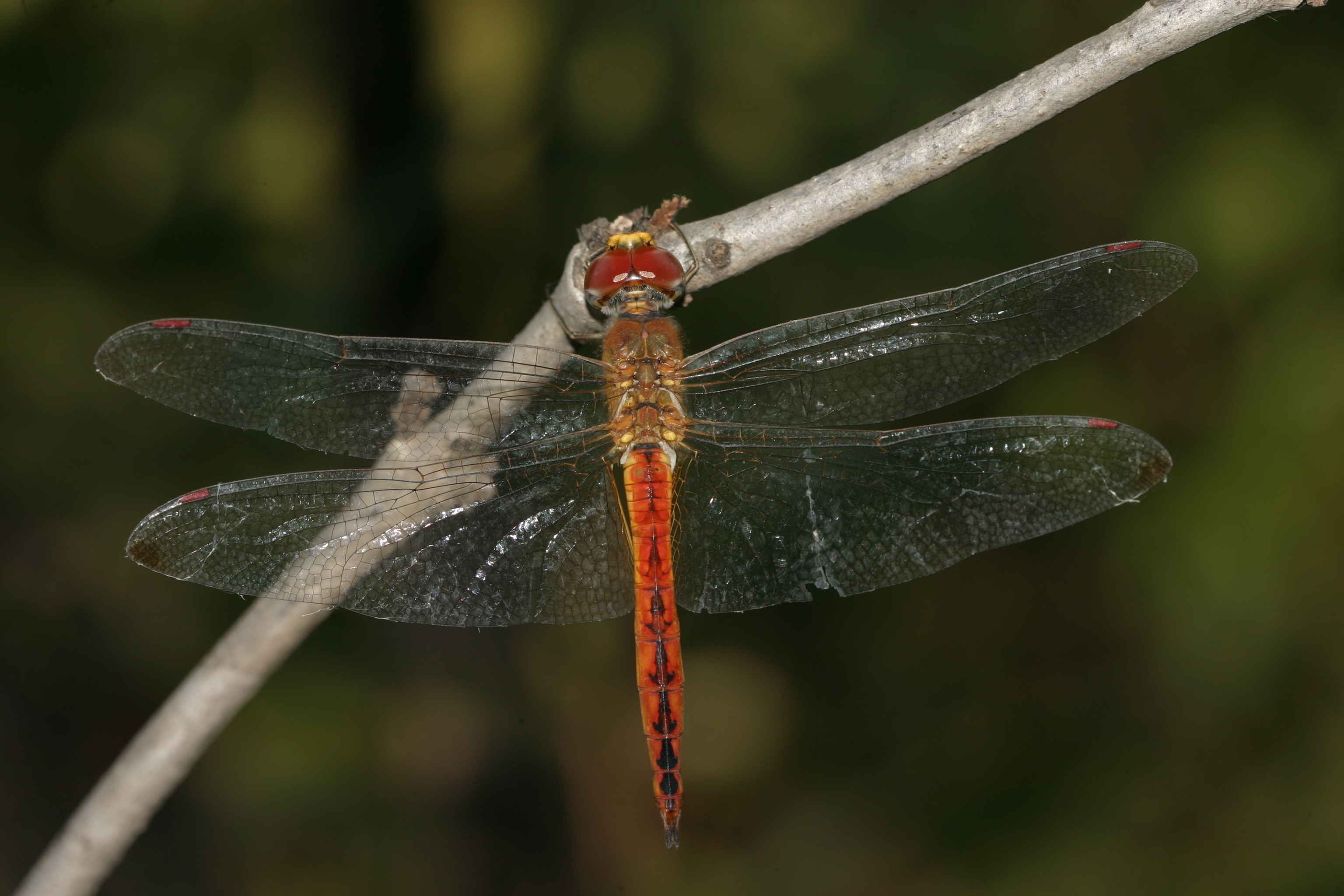
Male has narrow apical brown spot at the hind border of wings

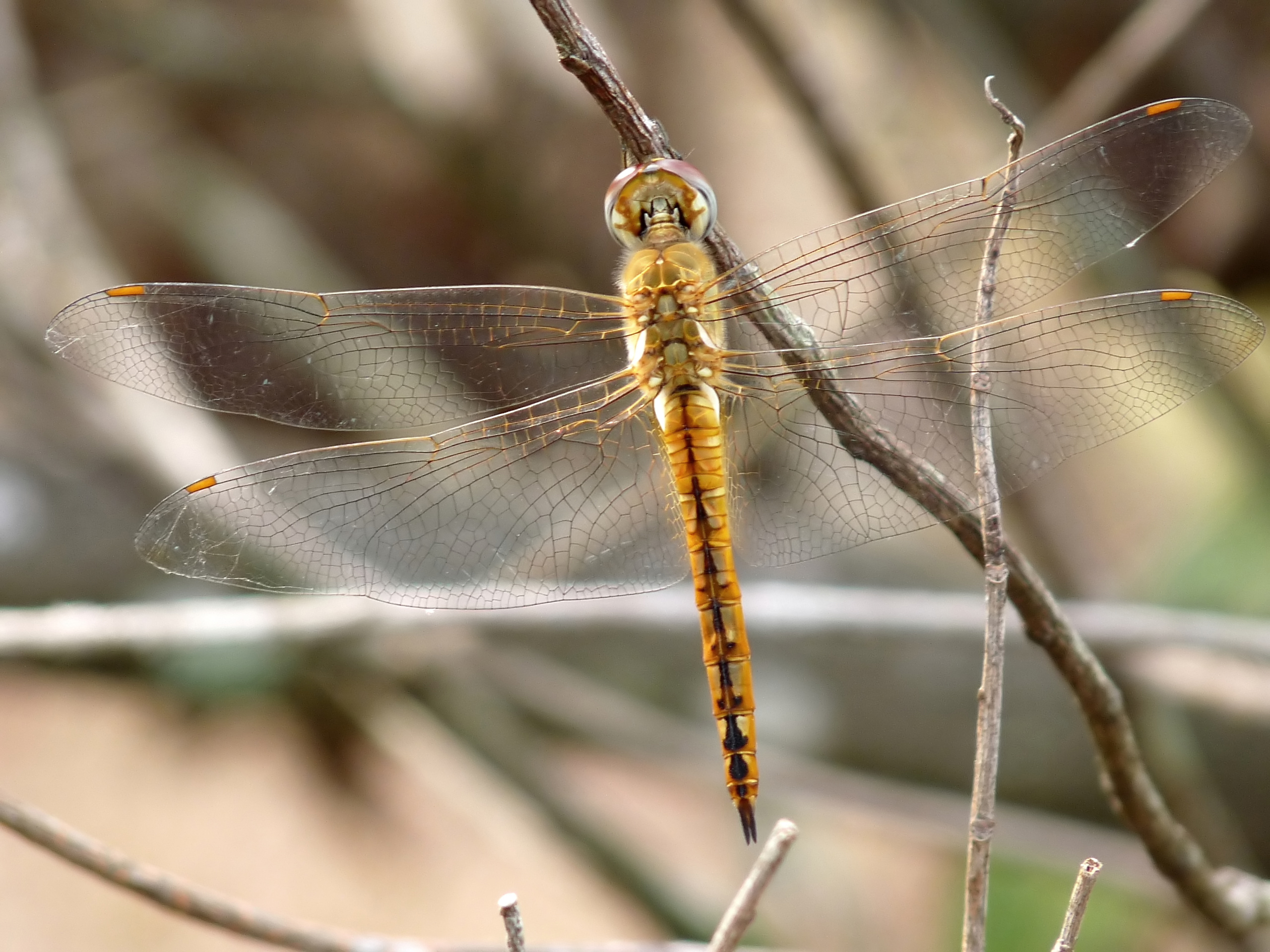
Female lacks apical brown patches in wings

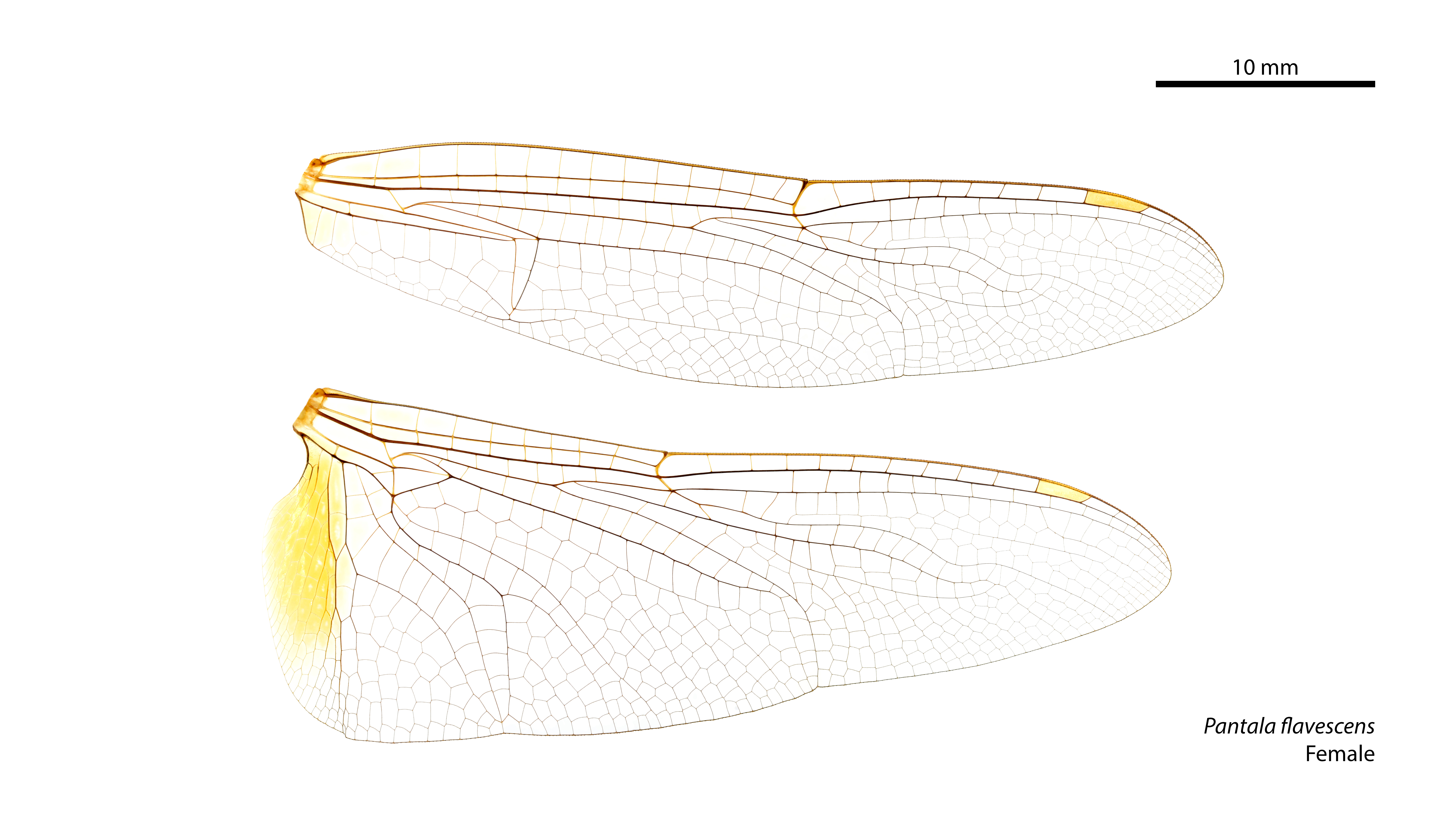
Female wings

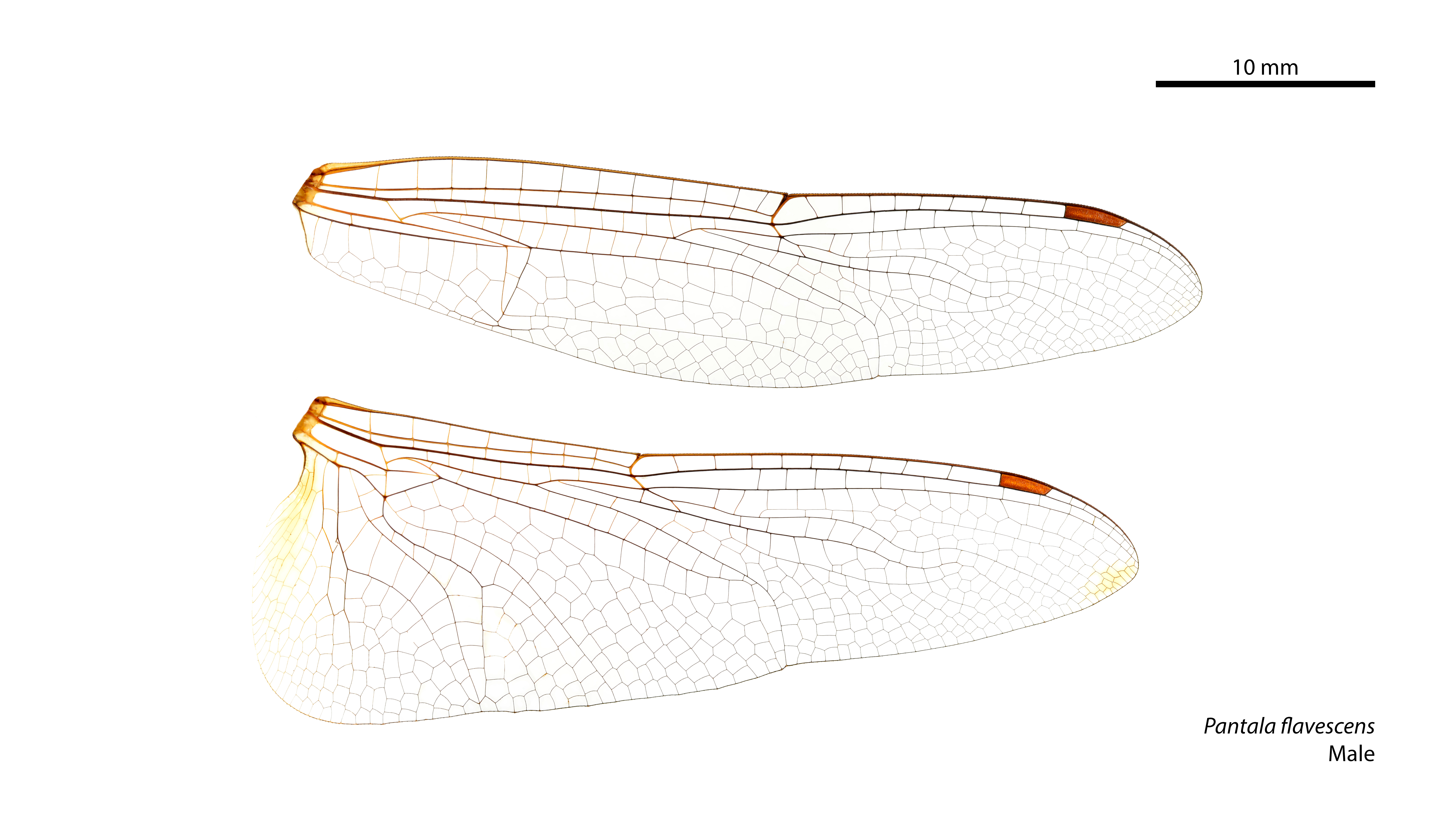
Male wings

The dragonfly is up to 4.5 cm long, reaching wingspans between 7.2 cm and 8.4 cm. The front side of the head is yellowish to reddish. The thorax is usually yellow to golden coloured with a dark and hairy line. There were also specimens with a brown or olive thorax. The abdomen has a similar colour as the thorax.

The wings are clear and very broad at the base. There, too, there are some specimens with olive, brown and yellow wings. On Easter Island there are wandering gliders with black wings.

The pterostigma turns yellowish. The transparent wings may turn a yellowish shade towards the tip. The chestnut-red eyes take up most of the head, as is usual in the large dragonflies (Anisoptera). The above colours explain the many scientific descriptions of this species under different names.

Females show some differences compared with males. Generally the males have reddish yellow abdomens marked with black, whereas the females lack the reddish wash in the abdomen. The males have golden yellow patches on the base of the hindwings and narrow apical brown spots at the hind border of the wings. The females lack apical brown patches in their wings.

In mainland males, the length of the femur, the longest leg section, varies; they also have longer front and shorter hindwings than the females. The island representatives, however, have the front and hindwings longer than the female, and the femur is the same for both sexes. There are other differences between mainland and island specimens, particularly in terms of colouring. Island representatives are generally darker.

=== Structure of the larva ===
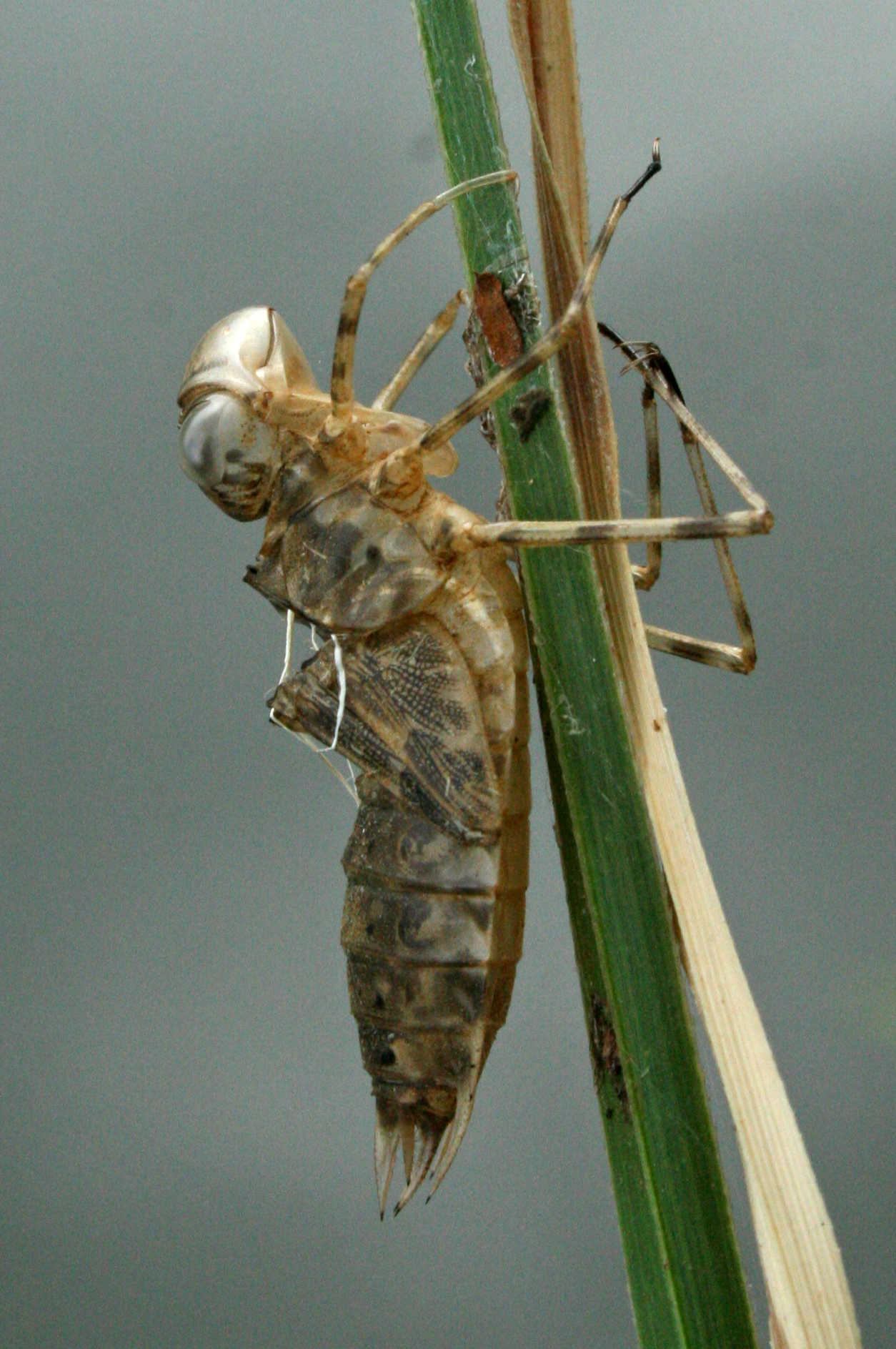
Exuviae

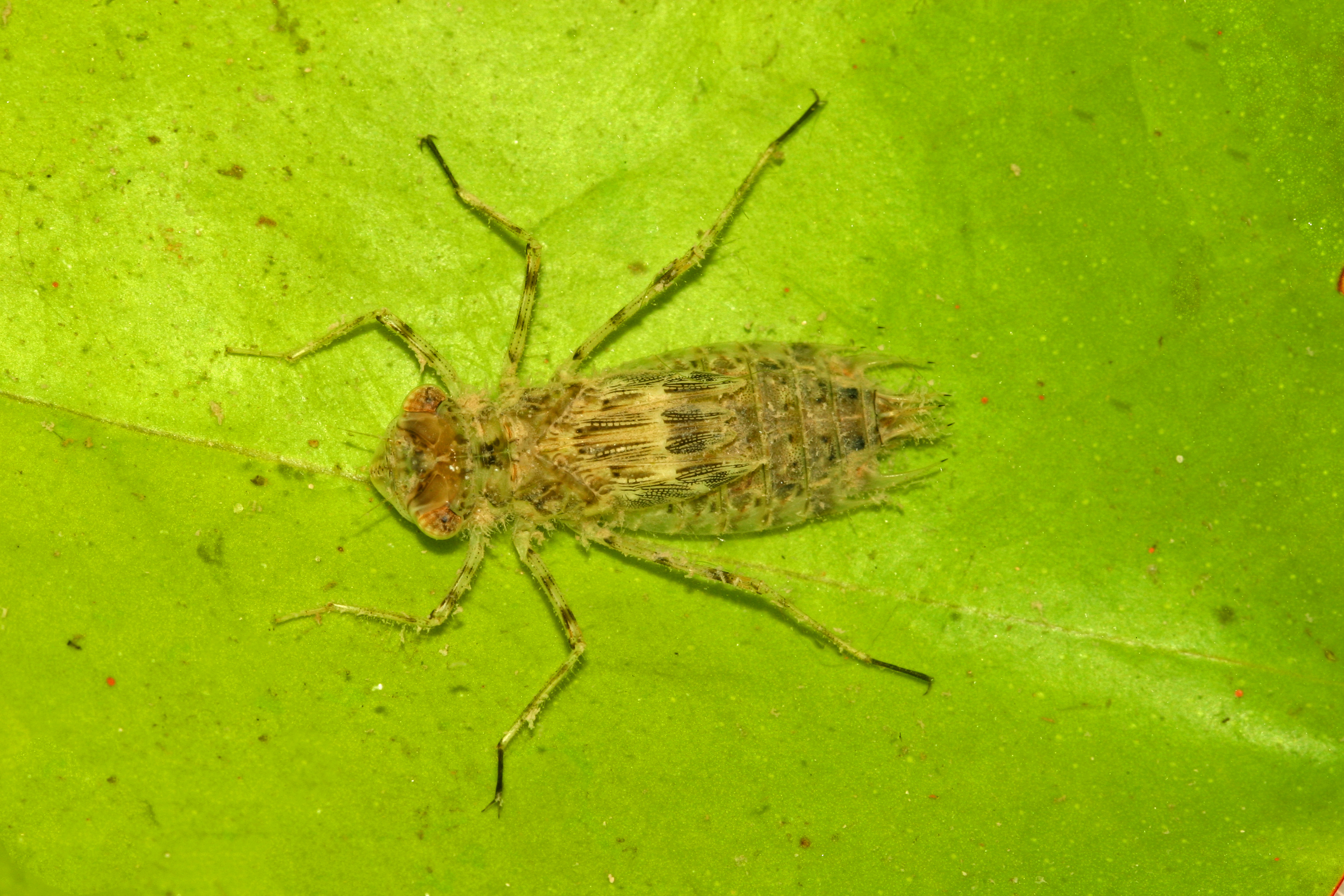
Larva in India

The larva is between 24 and 26 mm long. It is light green with light, purple speckles. The round eyes are sideways on the bottom of the head, the abdomen and the tail blunt.

The paired side plates on the eleventh segment of the abdomen, the so-called paraproct, is smooth when seen from the side. The unpaired dorsal plate of the eleventh segment, called the epiproct, is roughly the same length as or longer than the paraproct. This distinguishes them from larvae of the genus Tramea, where the epiproct is shorter than the paraproct. Furthermore, the mouth parts (palpus) have 12–14 bristles and thus fewer than P. hymenaea which has 15–18 bristles.

=== Similar species ===
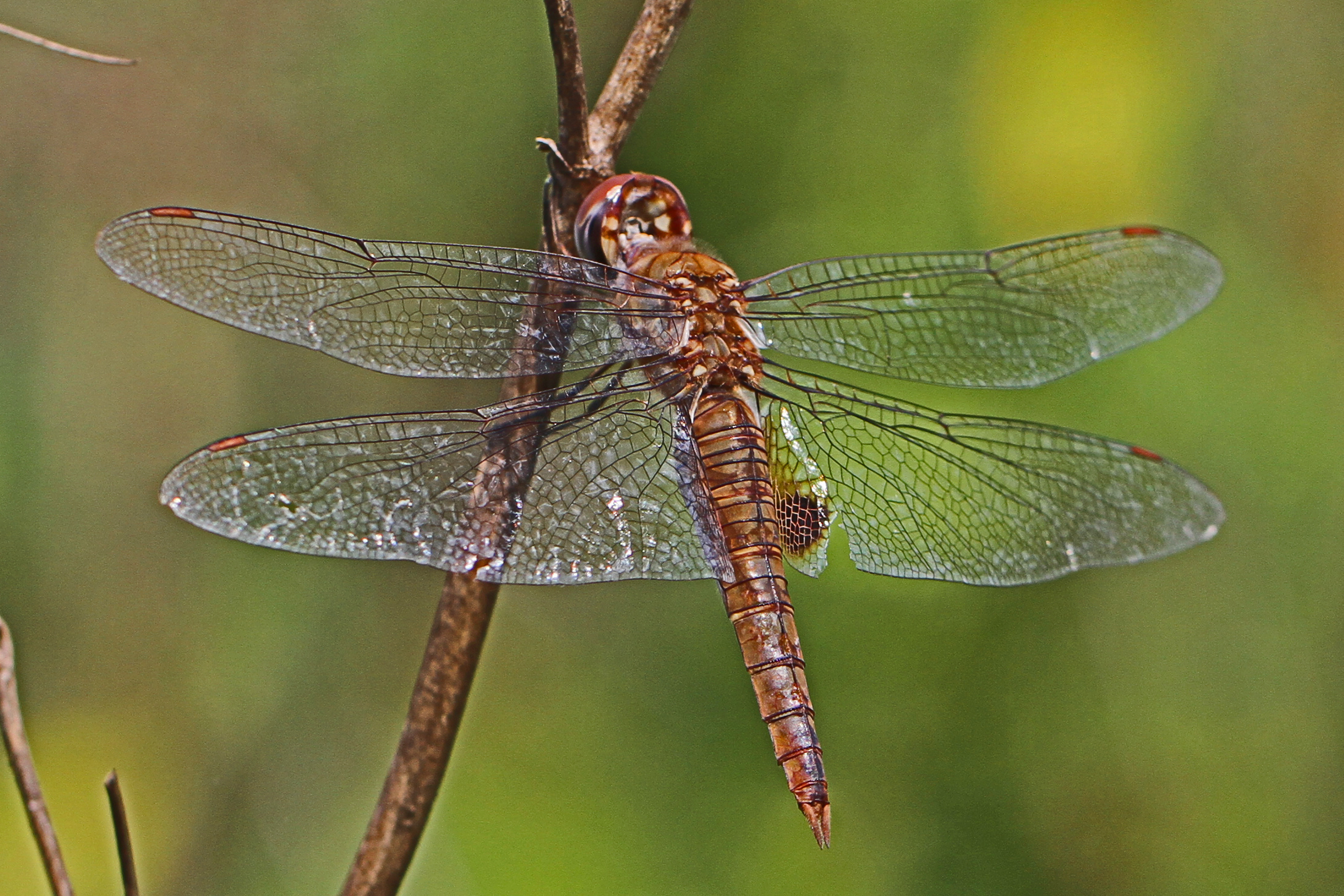
Pantala hymenaea; note the brown basal fleck in the hindwing

Pantala flavescens may be confused with the P. hymenaea, the "spot-winged glider", but this has a striking brown basal fleck in the hindwing and is generally slightly darker in colour. It might be taken for a member of the genus Tramea but these usually have a distinctive stripe on their hindwings.

== Life cycle ==
=== Reproduction and development ===
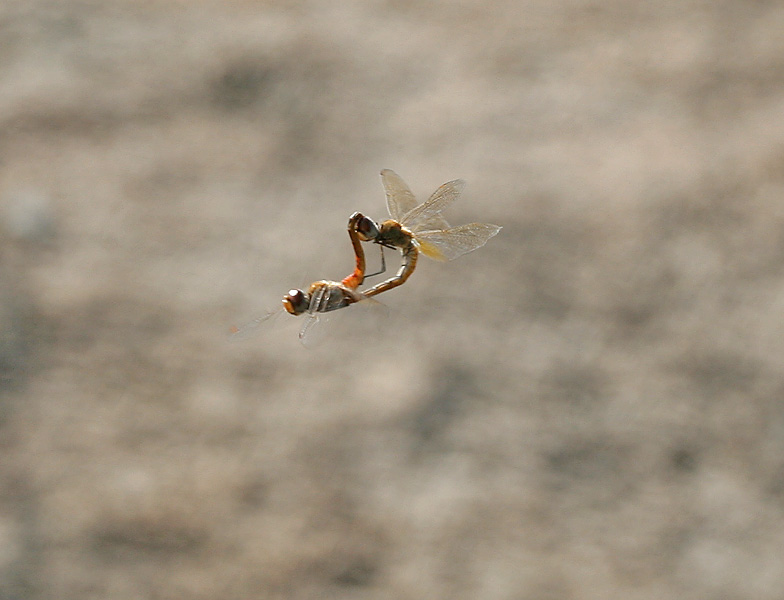
Mating in Bhuvanagiri, Telangana

As is usual in the Libellulidae family, there is no distinct courtship ritual. The females may pair many times, but usually only once a day.

After mating, the migrant dragonflies fly in tandem, with the female ovipositing while the male remains connected. A clutch consists of about 500 to 2000 eggs. The eggs are spheroid in shape with the semi-major axis 0.5 mm and 0.4 mm at the smallest points.

The larvae develop within 38 to 65 days, which allows this migrant dragonfly to reproduce in temporary waters or even in swimming pools. However, the larvae seem to be very sensitive to temperature. The life expectancy is not known and because of their high mobility it is almost impossible to determine.

=== Food ===
The larvae of the globe skimmer, like all dragonflies, are predatory. They forage very actively and eat fairly indiscriminately all sorts of aquatic invertebrates, such as aquatic insect larvae and small shrimps (Peracarida). Even tadpoles and small fish are used for food. The imago mostly eats small flying insects such as mosquitoes, swarming flying ants, and termites.

=== Flight behaviour ===
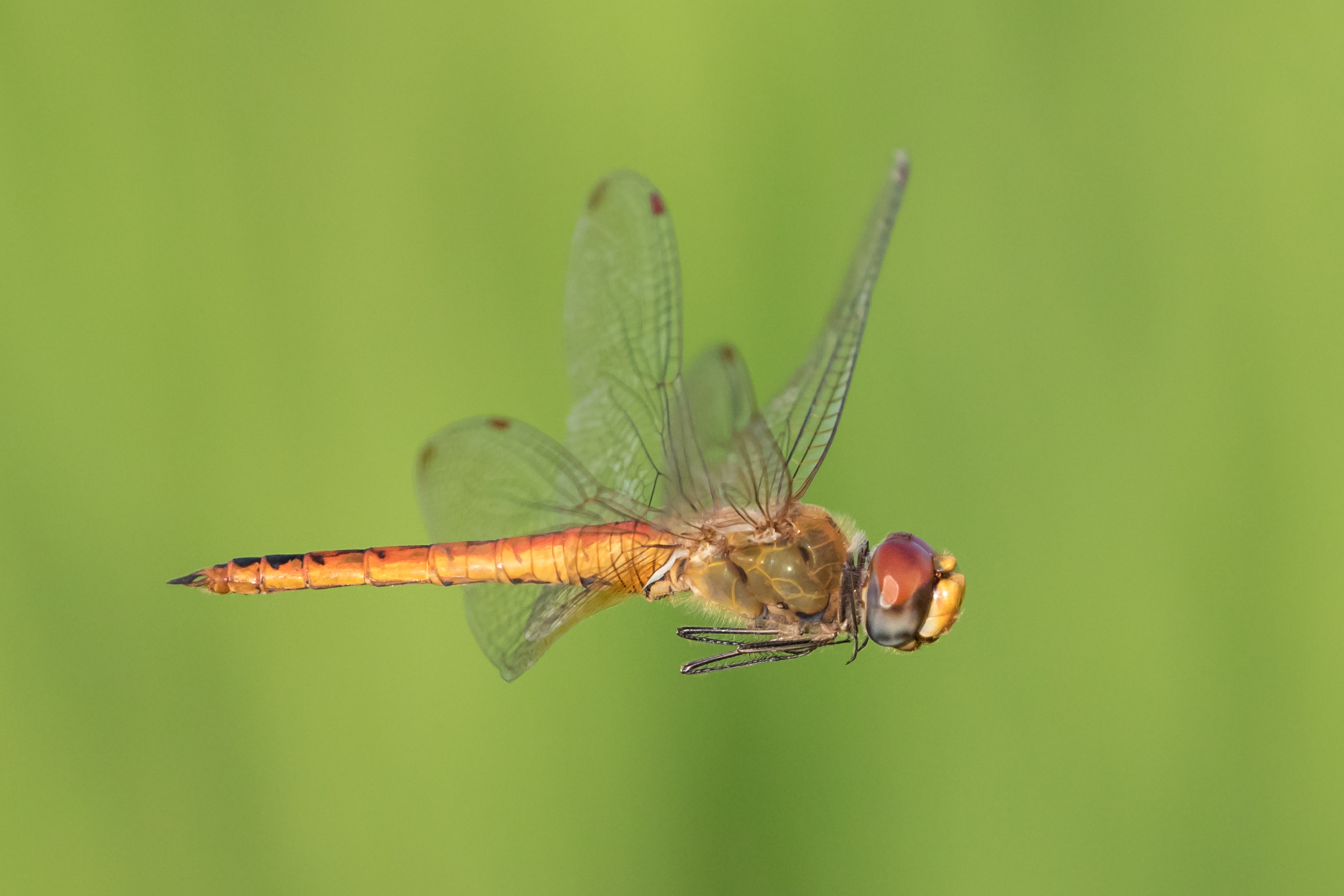
Pantala flavescens wandering behaviour

They are very conspicuous dragonflies; seen in swarms over paddy fields, playgrounds or open areas. They fly tirelessly with typical wandering flight for hours without making any perch. Their flight speed is up to 5 m/s. Especially in the autumn, the wandering glider flies in large swarms, using thermals to advantage. One report even speaks of a "cloud" covering 34 km^{2}. They prefer moist winds.

When landing, it seeks a vertical attitude. Like all large dragonflies, the wings are held out from the body at rest.

=== Distribution and flight ===
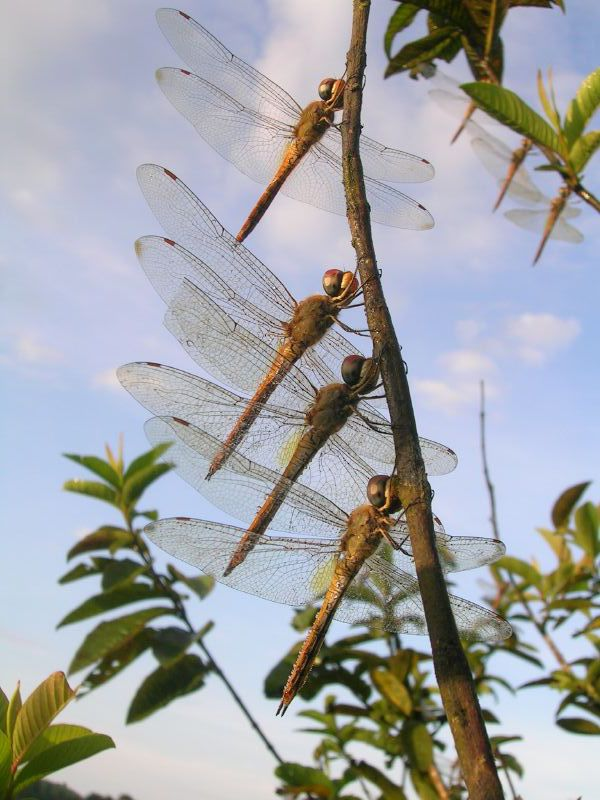
An aggregation of dragonflies during migration

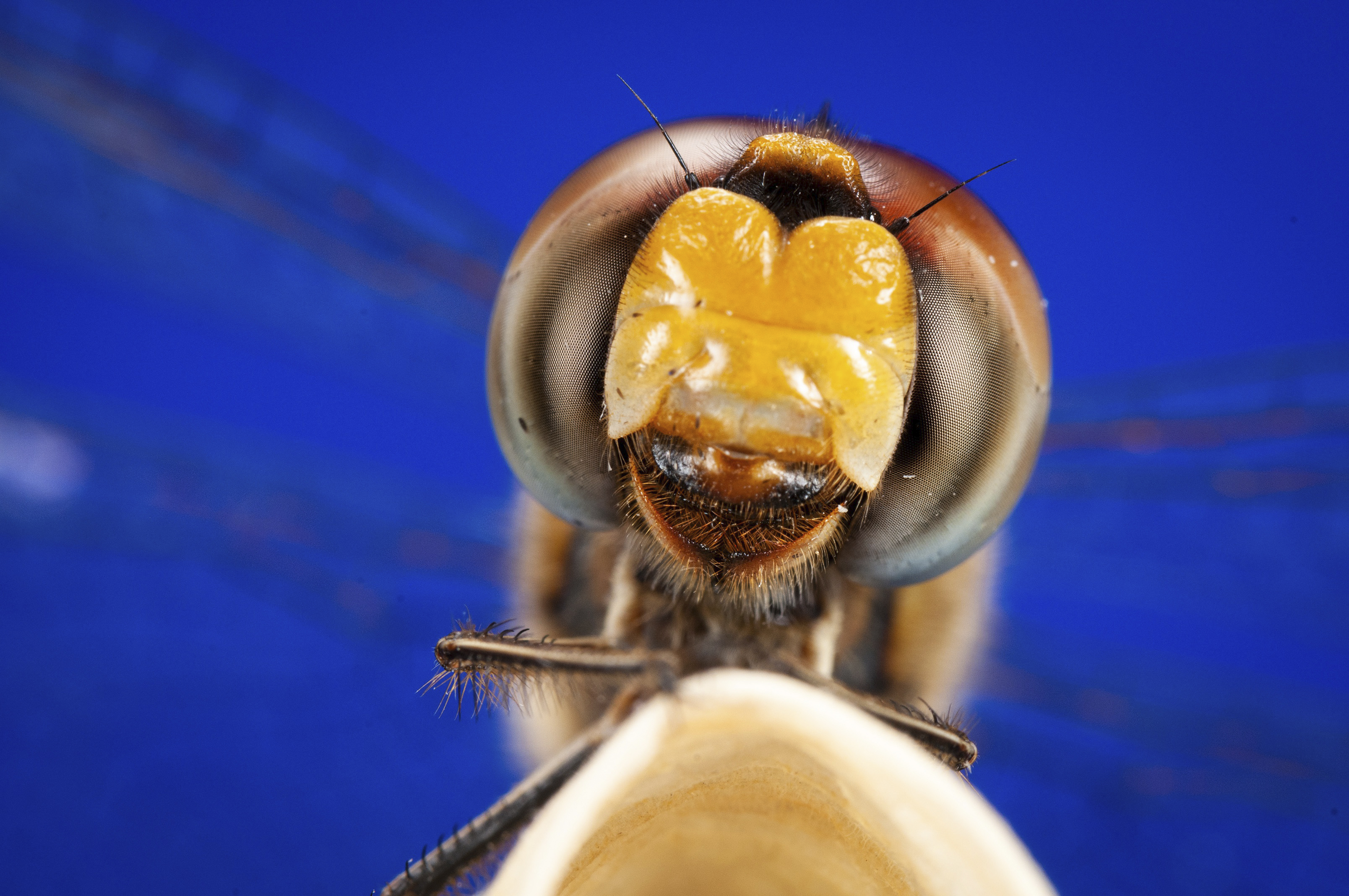
Face, Adult, South Korea

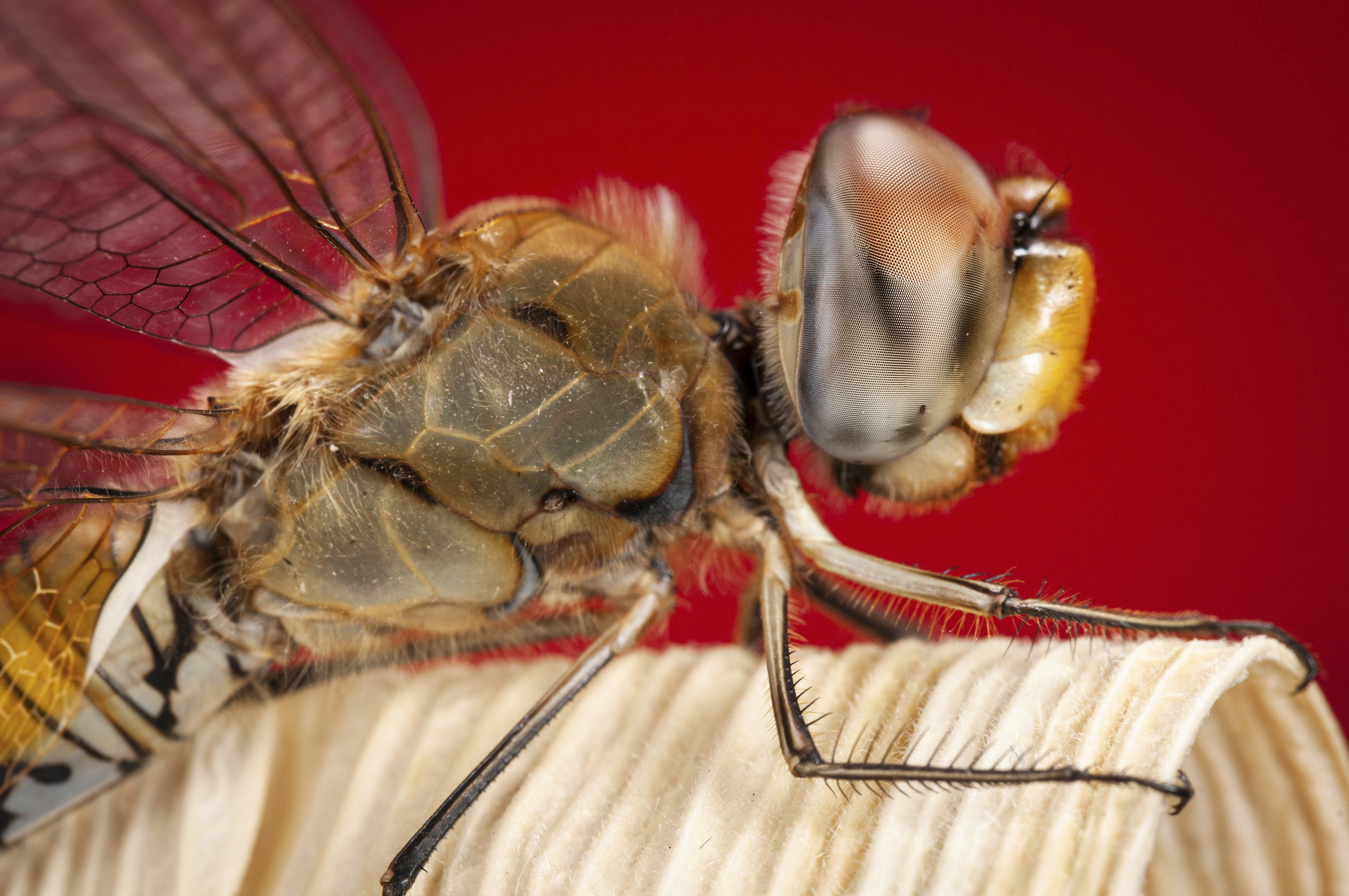
Pantala flavescens, Adult, South Korea

The globe skimmer, as its name suggests, has a very wide distribution area, between about the 40th parallels of latitude or within the 20 °C isotherm (areas of the world where the annual mean temperature is above 20 degrees Celsius), and up to about the 50th parallel north in North America. In Europe there are only occasional sightings of the species, with credible evidence to date mainly from the Aegean Sea and the adjacent mainland. Globe skimmer records from England or France are doubtful and may arise from co-importation with shipments of bananas. An explanation for the scarcity in Europe of this otherwise common species is the barrier effect of the Sahara which generates unfavourable winds, such as the Sirocco, whose dryness makes dragonfly passage almost impossible.

Their arrival in the subtropics and tropics coincides with the Intertropical Convergence Zone. More evidence of their preference for moist winds is that the dragonfly migrates to Southeast India's Tamil Nadu only after the second monsoon, which brings the rain to that region. In the rest of India, however, it arrives with the first rain-making monsoon. Observations and stable isotope evidence suggests that they migrate from India or beyond to Africa across the Arabian Sea. A recent sighting indicates the journey might start as far east as Meghalaya in India. The winds during the migration from India to mainland Africa are not as strong as the Somali jet, and thus there are multiple stopovers en route at the Maldives, Seychelles, and Mozambique. During the return journey, migrating swarms start arriving on the west coast of India May onwards, riding the strong winds of Somali Jet, and completing the journey from Africa to India, spanning about 3000 km (1860 miles) in a single flight.

It is the highest-flying dragonfly, recorded at 6,200 m in the Himalayas. It was also first dragonfly species that settled on Bikini Atoll after the nuclear tests there. Furthermore, it is the only Odonata on Easter Island. These individuals seem to be a small gene pool, derived from the continental populations, which is slowly creating a new type by genetic drift. The species cannot overwinter in colder areas like South Australia and Southern Canada, and must therefore be resupplied there by new migrants each year.

According to recent research carried out by biologists at Rutgers University-Newark this species of dragonfly is the world's longest known distance insect traveller. Genetic evidence taken from dragonflies across the globe suggests that these small size insects are travelling vast distances to mate and are thus creating a worldwide gene pool. Another study concluded that Pantala flavescens is a near global panmictic population.

Modelling of dragonfly flight, energy reserves and wind speeds in the Indian Ocean have suggested that Pantala flavescens performs the longest known non-stop migration compared to body size in the animal kingdom. Specifically the theorised migratory route from Male, Maldives to Kap Hafun, Somalia, is >2500 km long and constitutes travelling 50.7 million body lengths of the dragonfly without any possibility of stopping to rest.

== Naming ==
=== Common name ===
The English common names "wandering glider" and "globe skimmer" refer to its migratory behaviour. The German name Wanderlibelle means "migrant dragonfly". In Hong Kong, its name translates as "typhoon dragonfly" as it arrives with or shortly before the seasonal rain. The Japanese name is usubaki-tombo (ウスバキトンボ) which is translated as "yellow dragonfly with delicate wings". Similarly, the South Korean name is '된장잠자리'(translated as "doenjang dragonfly") because its colour is similar to doenjang, the Korean bean paste.

=== Scientific name ===
In the scientific name Pantala flavescens, the genus name Pantala means "all wings", alluding to the big and long wings. The specific name comes from the Latin flavescens, meaning "yellowish", and refers to its distinctive golden tint.

The species was first described in 1798 as Libellula flavescens by Fabricius as follows:

L. [flavescens] alis hyalinis: stigmate niveo, corpore flavescente. Habitat in India Dom. Daldorff. Statura praecedentium. Caput flavescens oculis magnis, fuscis. Thorax flavescens, immaculatus. Abdomen compressum, flavescens linea dorsali nigra. Alae albae stigmate marginali niveo.

— Fabricius, Entomologia systematica emendata et aucta Supplement S. 285

The first description of this underlying holotype is in the Zoological Museum of Copenhagen University taken from a female collected from India. In following years there appeared more descriptions with different names. In 1805, Palisot de Beauvois designated a specimen from Nigeria as Libellula viridula. Around 1823 the British entomologist Dale, in an unpublished manuscript, described an allegedly Norfolk-trapped male as Libellula sparing halli, It is now in the Oxford University Museum of Natural History. In 1839, the German entomologist Burmeister named a male collected in Madras as Libellula analis (now in the Zoological Collection of the University of Halle-Wittenberg) and another male from Brazil as Libellula terminalis (now in the Natural History Museum of Vienna.) In 1910, the field was cleared as Richard Anthony Muttkowski recognized that these species were all synonyms. A description made of Sympetrum tandicola (Singh) 1955 from a male collected in the Himalayas and deposited at the Zoological Survey India, Calcutta, was identified as belonging to Pantala flavescens in 1973.

== Protection status ==
The globe skimmer has NatureServe conservation status G5, meaning it is secure (common, widespread and abundant) worldwide. This status was awarded on 30 December 1985. In the United States, it has the national equivalent protection status N5. In Canada, however, it is lower with N4 meaning it is apparently secure – uncommon but not rare but with some cause for long-term concern. Even at this level, it is granted protected status in many states of the US and Canada.

== Postage stamps ==
Due to its wide distribution, the globe skimmer appears on a number of stamps.

On 29 July 1974 Wallis and Futuna published a 45 franc with a dragonfly over a water surface with some plants showing. It has Michel catalog number 257 appearing in a set of insect motifs. On 9 November 1975. The Pitcairn Islands published a 15 cent with a dragonfly flying on a dark blue background. Its Miche number is 154, and it also appeared in an insect collection.

Tuvalu brought out a 10 cent on 25 May 1983 which shows a globe skimmer. The lithographic illustration was designed by J E Cooter. Its Michel number is 190, and it appeared in a set of dragonflies. The representation was limited to the dragonfly with grasses. Botswana published a six-thebe stamp showing the front of a blue dragonfly on a green background.

Wallis and Futuna published another stamp on 4 August 1998, a 36F with the dragonfly shown flying on a yellowish background. It has Michel number 736 and appeared together with other insect motifs.

The latest stamp comes from 2003 and appeared in North Korea. Its value is 15 wŏn and it represents a sedentary globe skimmer on a spike.
