= Riffle darner =

Riffle darner may refer to:

- Oplonaeschna armata, a North American dragonfly species
- Notoaeschna, a genus of Australian dragonflies including two species:
  - Notoaeschna geminata – northern riffle darner
  - Notoaeschna sagittata – southern riffle darner
