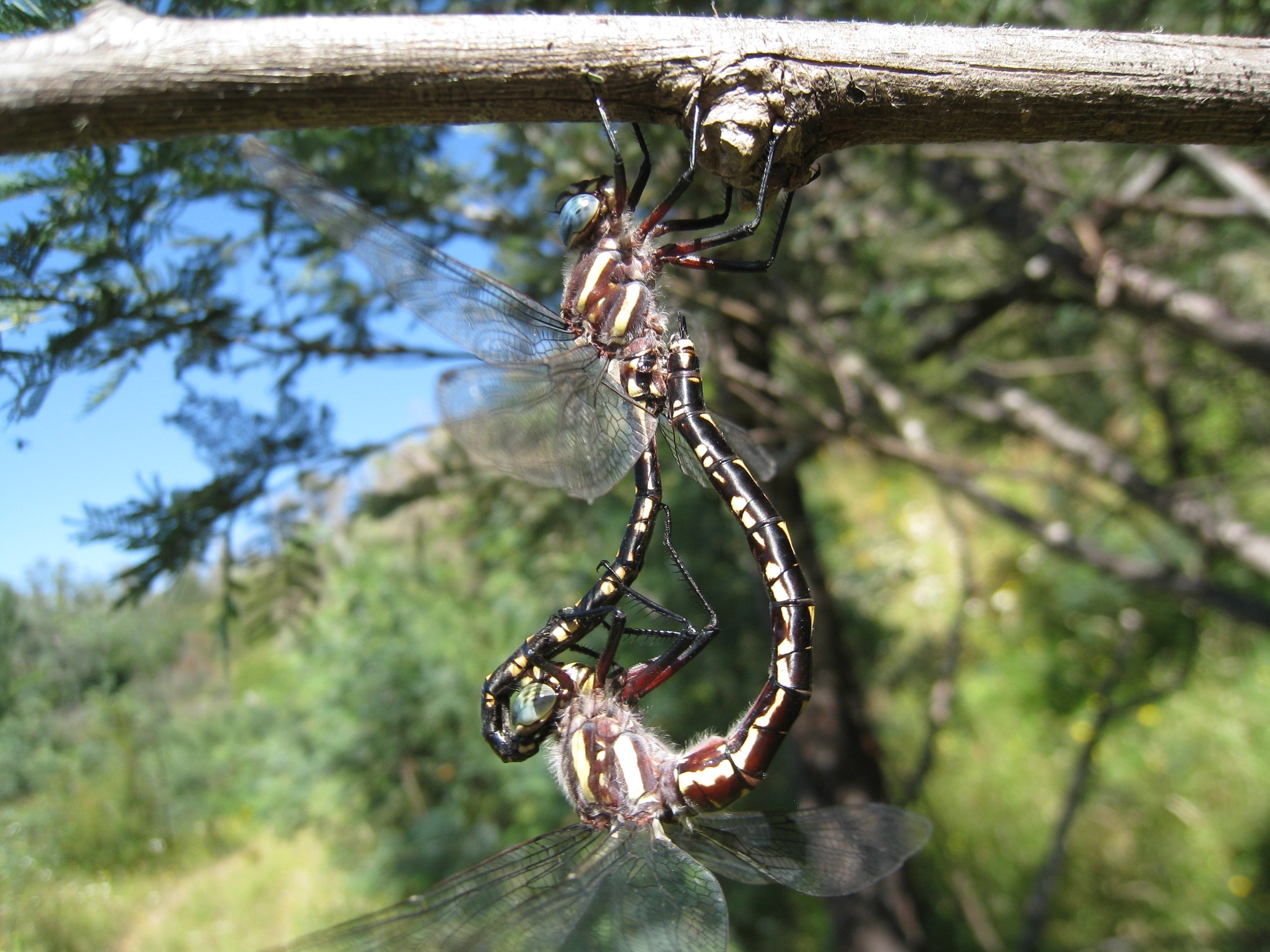
- Notoaeschna sagittata mating pair

Scientific classification
- Kingdom: Animalia
- Phylum: Arthropoda
- Clade: Pancrustacea
- Class: Insecta
- Order: Odonata
- Suborder: Anisoptera
- Family: Aeshnidae
- Genus: Notoaeschna; Tillyard, 1916

= Notoaeschna =

Genus of dragonflies

Notoaeschna is a genus of dragonflies in the family Aeshnidae, endemic to south-eastern Australia.

Species of Notoaeschna are large, dark brown to black dragonflies with yellow markings.

== Species ==
The genus Notoaeschna includes the following species:

- Notoaeschna geminata Theischinger, 1982 – northern riffle darner
- Notoaeschna sagittata (Martin, 1901) – southern riffle darner

== Etymology ==
The genus name Notoaeschna is derived from the Greek νότος (notos, "south" or "the south wind"), combined with -aeschna, a suffix commonly used for dragonflies associated with the Aeshna group. The name refers to a southern representative of that group.

== See also ==
- List of Odonata species of Australia
