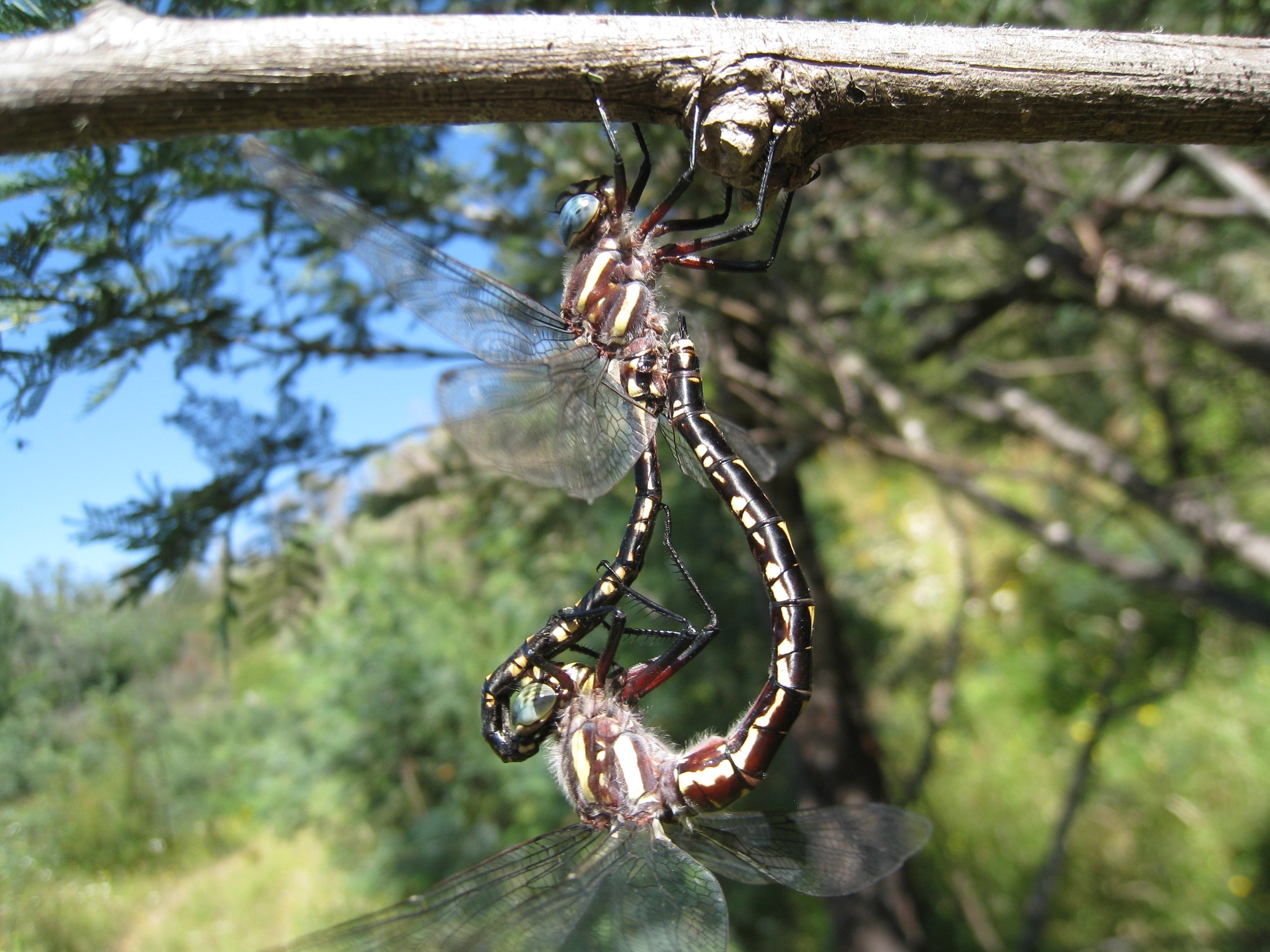
- Mating pair, female is upside down

Conservation status
- Least Concern (IUCN 3.1)

Scientific classification
- Kingdom: Animalia
- Phylum: Arthropoda
- Clade: Pancrustacea
- Class: Insecta
- Order: Odonata
- Suborder: Anisoptera
- Family: Aeshnidae
- Genus: Notoaeschna
- Species: N. sagittata

Binomial name
- Notoaeschna sagittata (Martin, 1901)

Synonyms
- Planaeschna sagittata Martin, 1901

= Notoaeschna sagittata =

Southern riffle darner

Species of dragonfly

Notoaeschna sagittata is a species of Australian dragonfly of the family Aeshnidae, known as the southern riffle darner. It is endemic to eastern Australia, occurring south of the Hunter River, New South Wales, where it inhabits rapid streams.

Notoaeschna sagittata is a large, dark brown to black dragonfly with yellow markings. It appears similar to Notoaeschna geminata, the northern riffle darner, which occurs north of the Hunter River.

== Etymology ==
The genus name Notoaeschna is derived from the Greek νότος (notos, "south" or "the south wind"), combined with -aeschna, a suffix commonly used for dragonflies associated with the Aeshna group. The name refers to a southern representative of that group.

The species name sagittata is derived from the Latin sagitta ("arrow") and the suffix -atus ("provided with" or "marked with"), referring to spearhead-shaped markings on the abdomen.

== Gallery ==
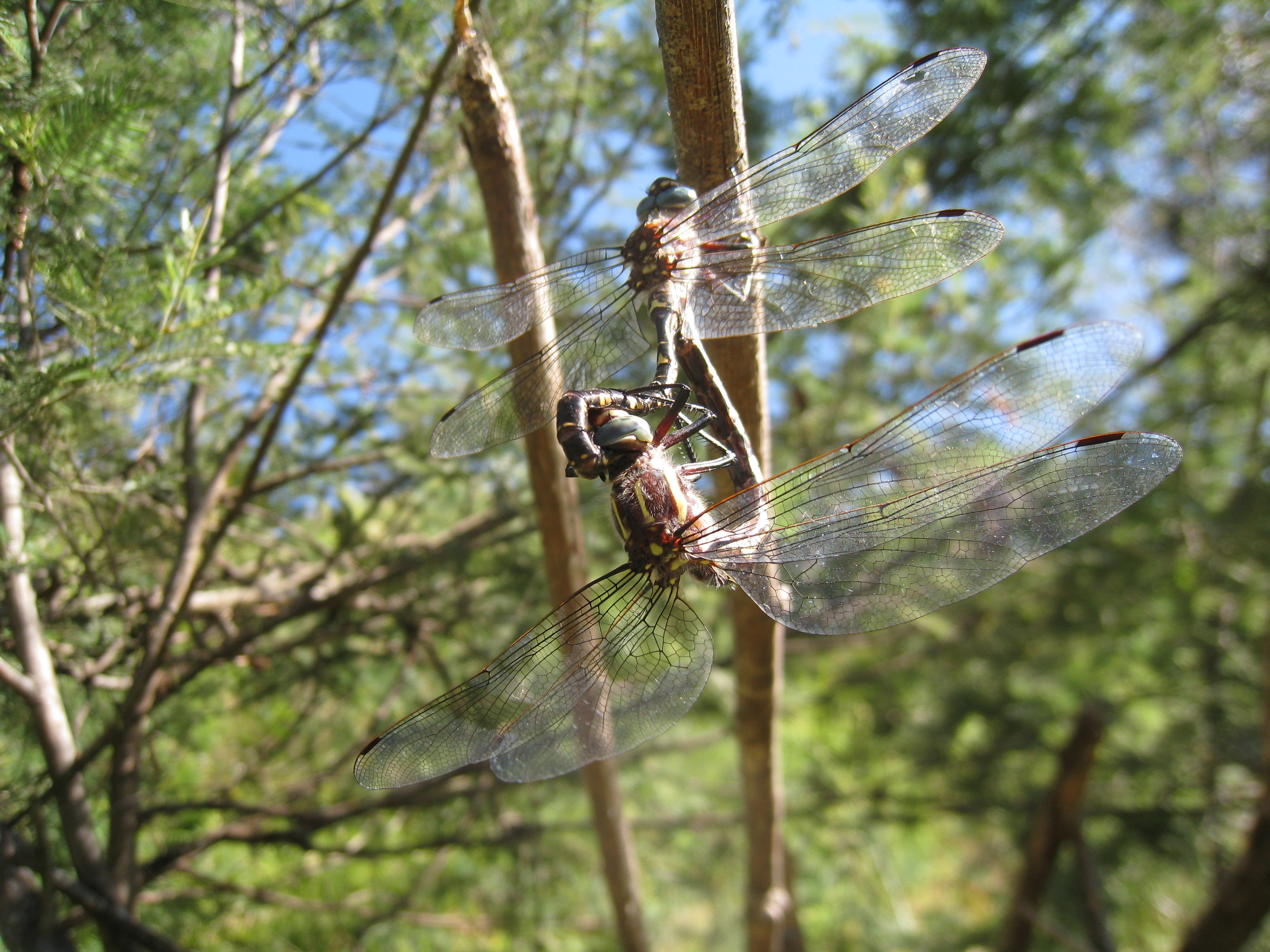
Mating pair

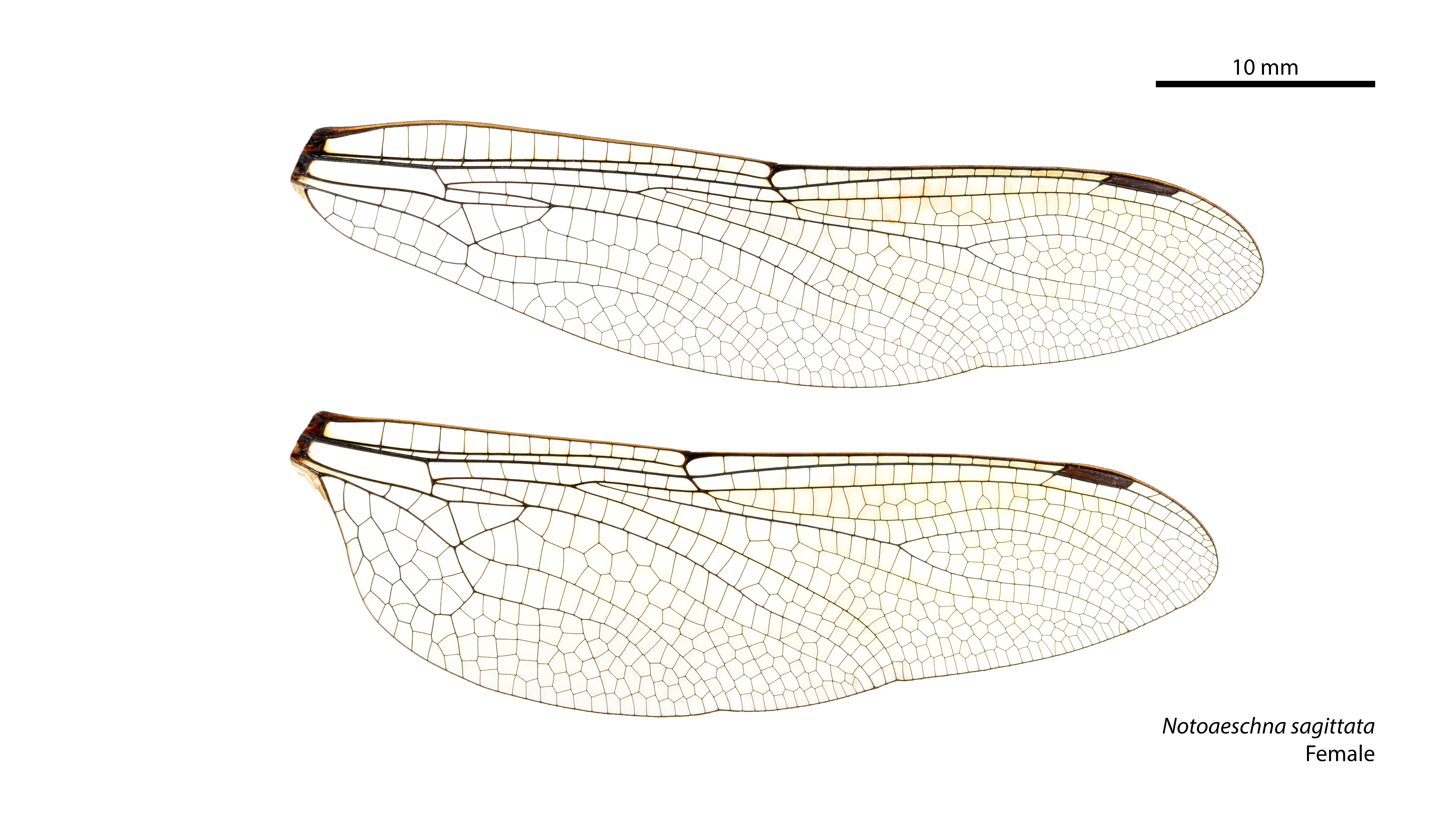
Photo of female wings

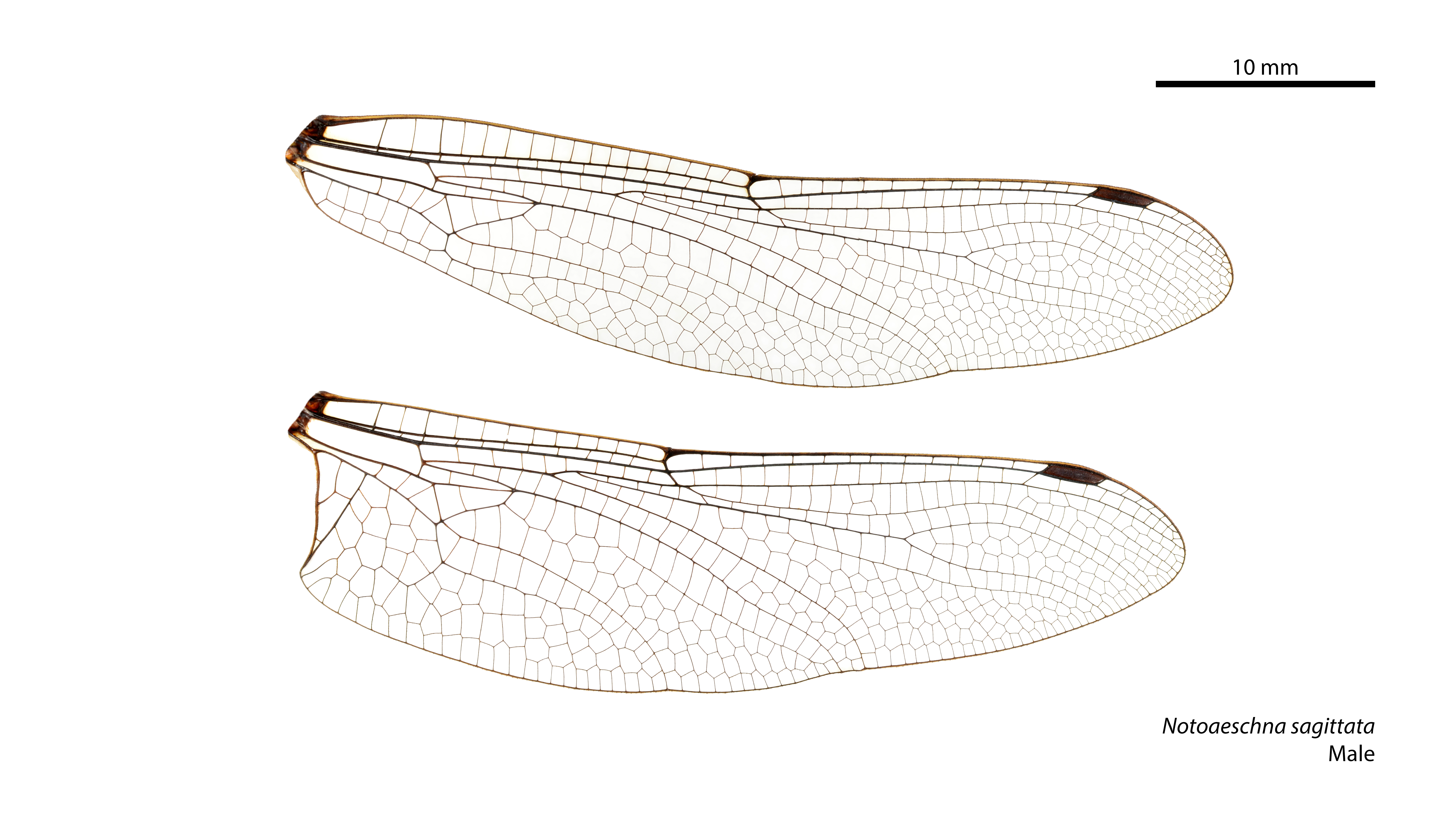
Photo of male wings

== See also ==
- List of Odonata species of Australia
