= Notoaeschna geminata =

Northern riffle darner

Conservation status
- Least Concern (IUCN 3.1)

Scientific classification
- Kingdom: Animalia
- Phylum: Arthropoda
- Clade: Pancrustacea
- Class: Insecta
- Order: Odonata
- Suborder: Anisoptera
- Family: Aeshnidae
- Genus: Notoaeschna
- Species: N. geminata

Binomial name
- Notoaeschna geminata Theischinger, 1982

Species of dragonfly

Notoaeschna geminata is a species of dragonfly in the family Aeshnidae, known as the northern riffle darner. It is endemic to eastern Australia, occurring north of the Hunter River, New South Wales, where it inhabits rapid streams.

Notoaeschna geminata is a large, dark brown to black dragonfly with yellow markings. It appears similar to Notoaeschna sagittata, the southern riffle darner, which occurs south of the Hunter River.

== Etymology ==
The genus name Notoaeschna is derived from the Greek νότος (notos, "south" or "the south wind"), combined with -aeschna, a suffix commonly used for dragonflies associated with the Aeshna group. The name refers to a southern representative of that group.

The species name geminata is derived from the Latin geminatus ("doubled" or "paired"), referring to abdominal spots divided into two halves.

== Gallery ==
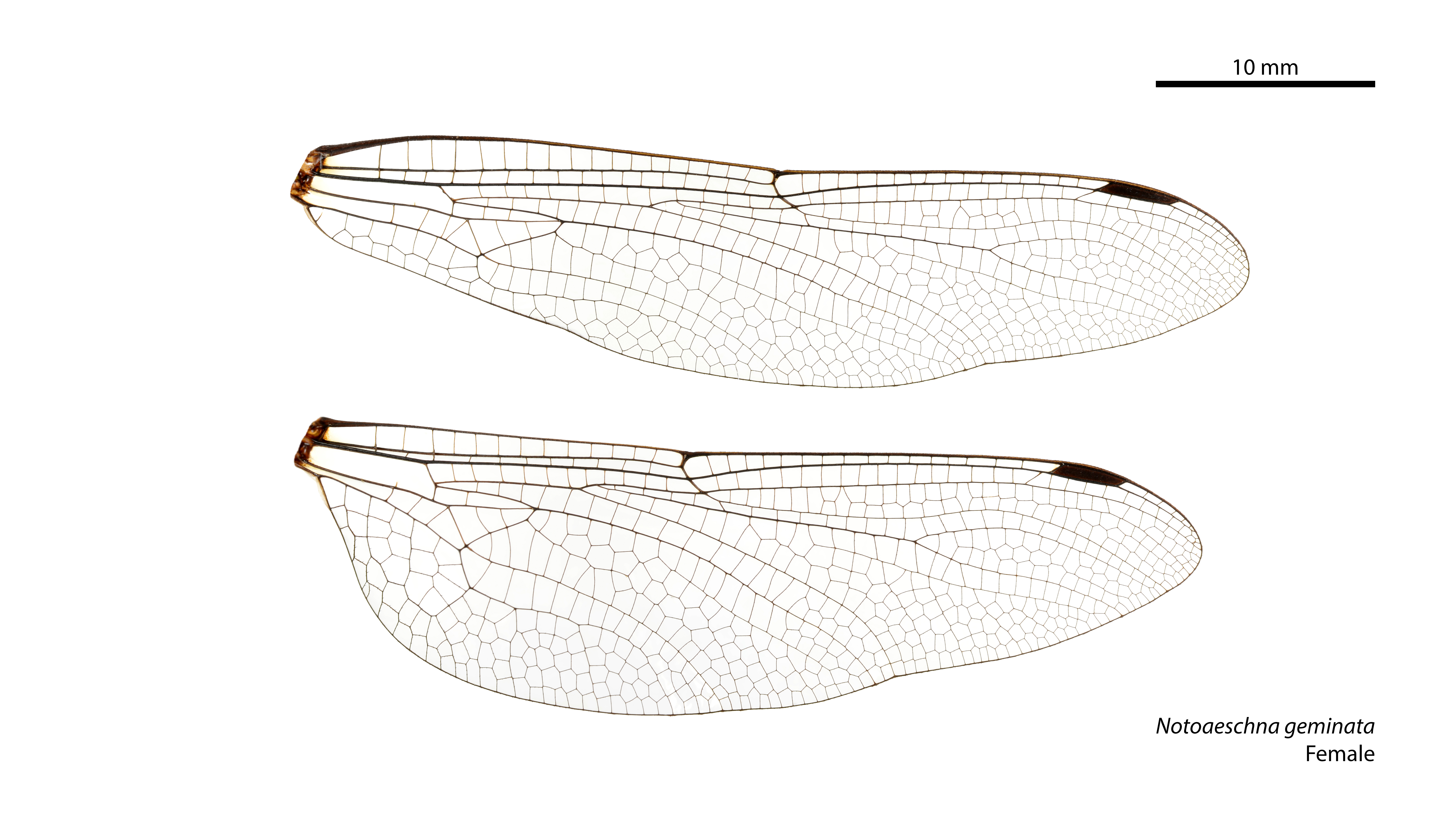
Female wings

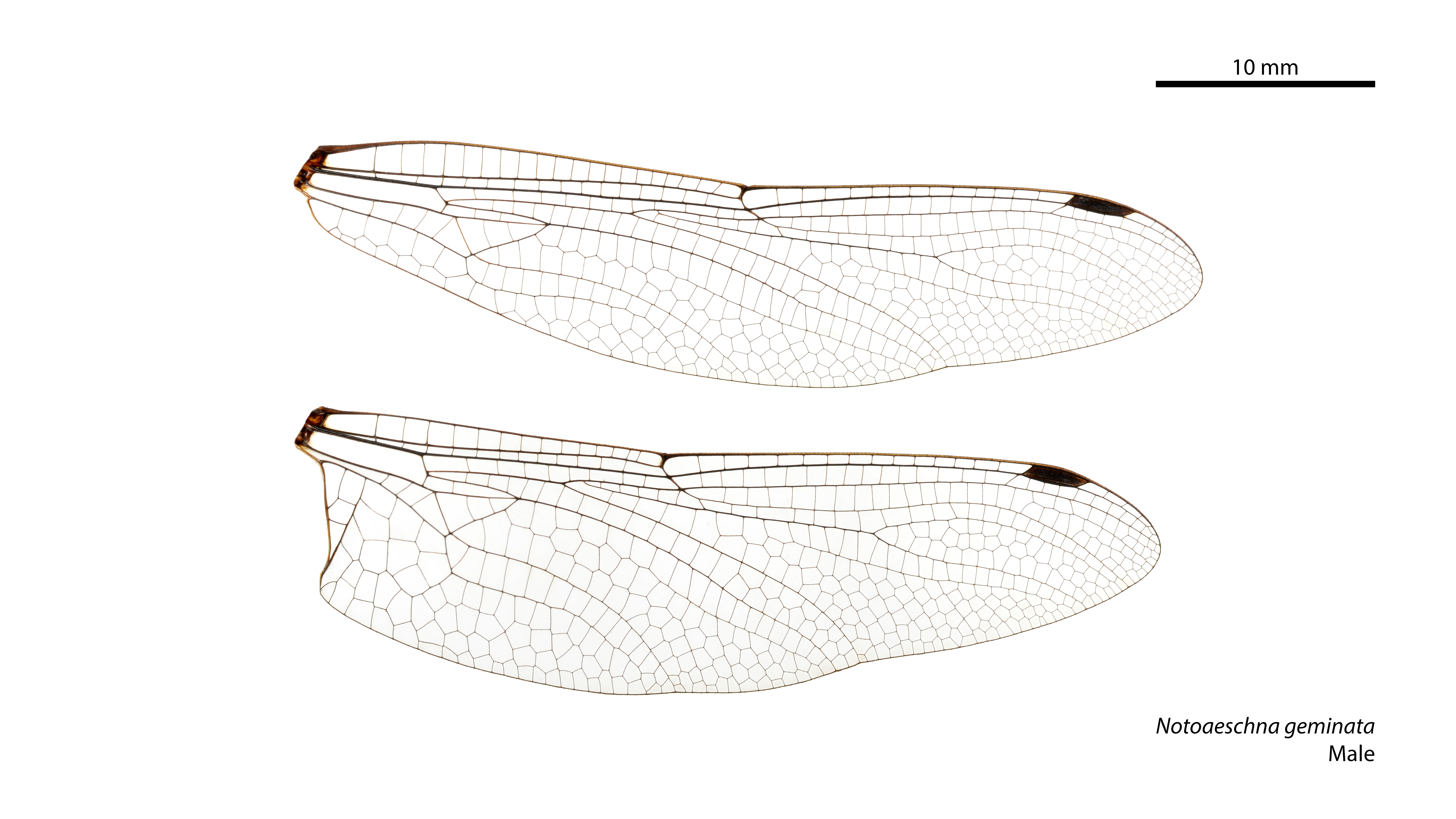
Male wings

== See also ==
- List of Odonata species of Australia
