= Spinaeschna tripunctata =

Southern cascade darner

Conservation status
- Least Concern (IUCN 3.1)

Scientific classification
- Kingdom: Animalia
- Phylum: Arthropoda
- Clade: Pancrustacea
- Class: Insecta
- Order: Odonata
- Suborder: Anisoptera
- Family: Aeshnidae
- Genus: Spinaeschna
- Species: S. tripunctata

Binomial name
- Spinaeschna tripunctata (Martin, 1901)

Synonyms
- Planaeschna tripunctata Martin, 1901

Species of dragonfly

Spinaeschna tripunctata is a species of dragonfly in the family Aeshnidae, known as the southern cascade darner. It is a medium to large, dark brown dragonfly with greenish-yellow markings. It is endemic to eastern Australia, occurring in New South Wales and Victoria, where it inhabits streams and rivers.

== Etymology ==
The genus name Spinaeschna is derived from the Latin spina ("thorn" or "spine"), combined with -aeschna, a suffix commonly used for dragonflies associated with the Aeshna group. The name likely refers to a large spine on the male appendages.

The species name tripunctata is derived from the Latin tres ("three"), punctum ("point" or "spot"), and the suffix -atus ("marked with"), referring to three well-defined spots on the second segment of the abdomen.

== Gallery ==
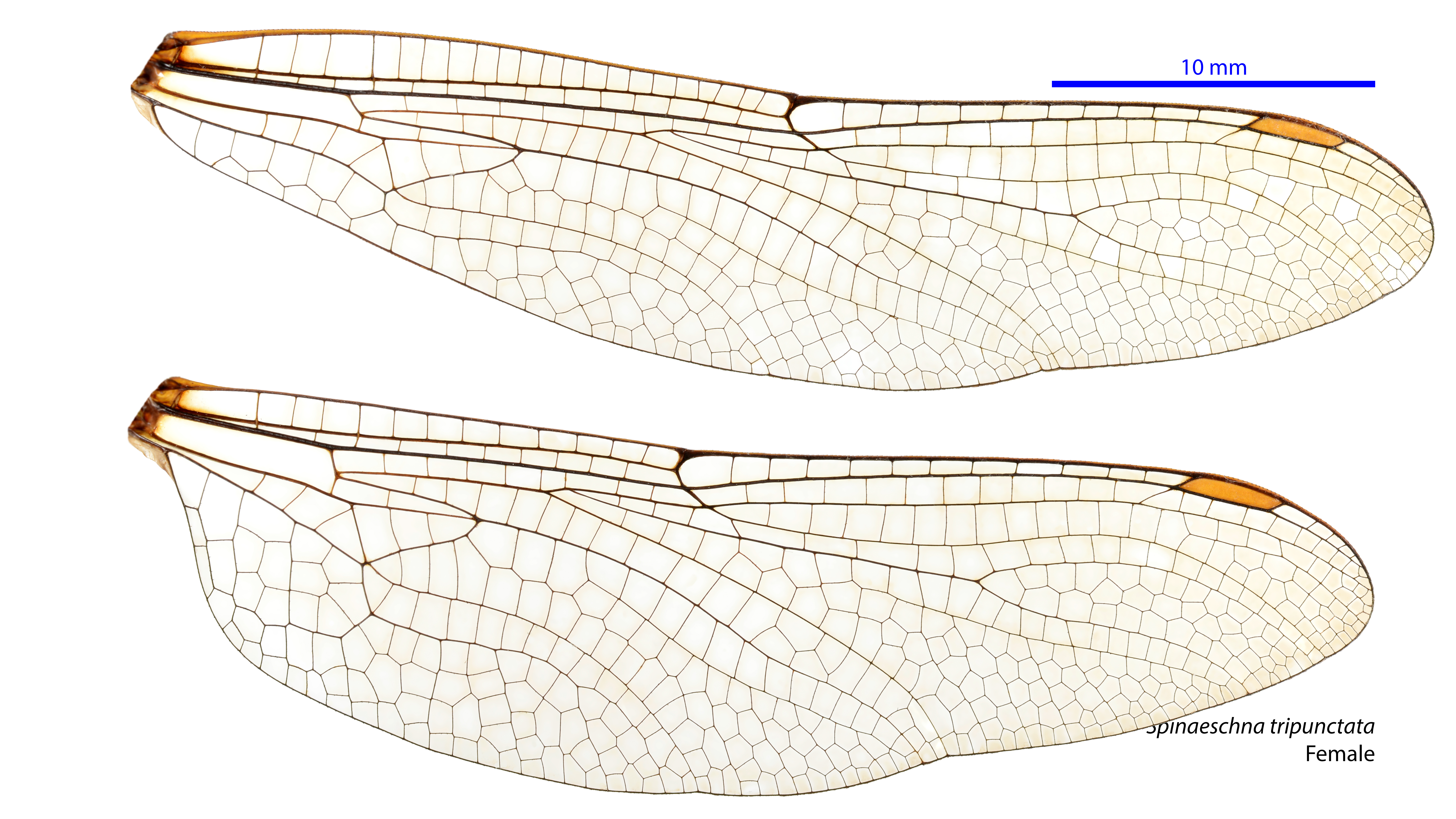
Female wings

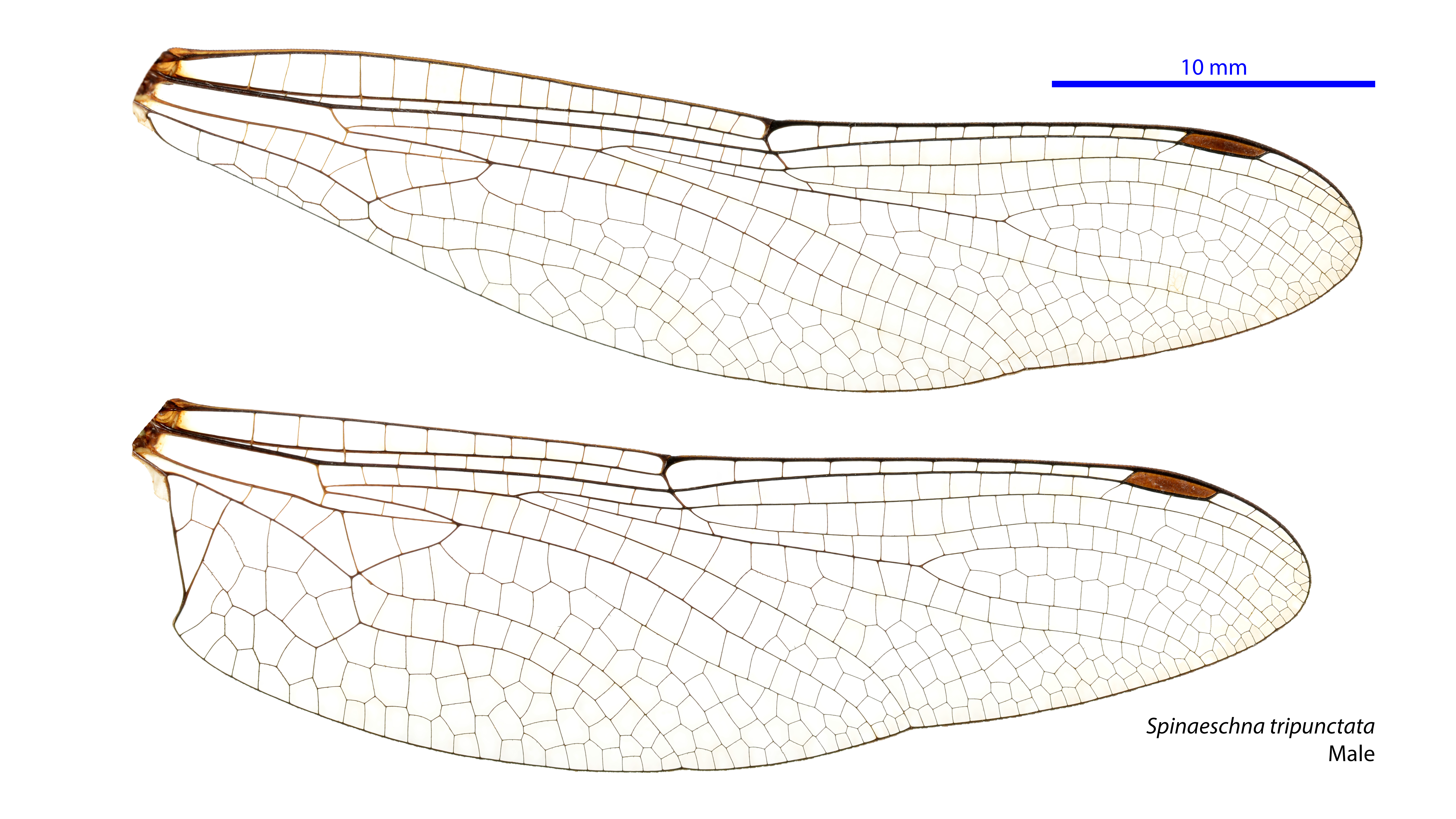
Male wings

== See also ==
- List of Odonata species of Australia
