= Spinaeschna =

Scientific classification
- Kingdom: Animalia
- Phylum: Arthropoda
- Clade: Pancrustacea
- Class: Insecta
- Order: Odonata
- Suborder: Anisoptera
- Family: Aeshnidae
- Genus: Spinaeschna; Theischinger, 1982

Genus of dragonflies

Spinaeschna is a genus of dragonflies in the family Aeshnidae. These dragonflies are endemic to eastern Australia, where they inhabit streams and rivers.

Species of Spinaeschna are medium to large, dark brown dragonflies with greenish-yellow markings.

== Species ==
The genus Spinaeschna includes the following two species:

- Spinaeschna tripunctata (Martin, 1901) – southern cascade darner
- Spinaeschna watsoni Theischinger, 1982 – northern cascade darner

== Etymology ==
The genus name Spinaeschna is derived from the Latin spina ("thorn" or "spine"), combined with -aeschna, a suffix commonly used for dragonflies associated with the Aeshna group. The name likely refers to a large spine on the male appendages.

== See also ==
- List of Odonata species of Australia
