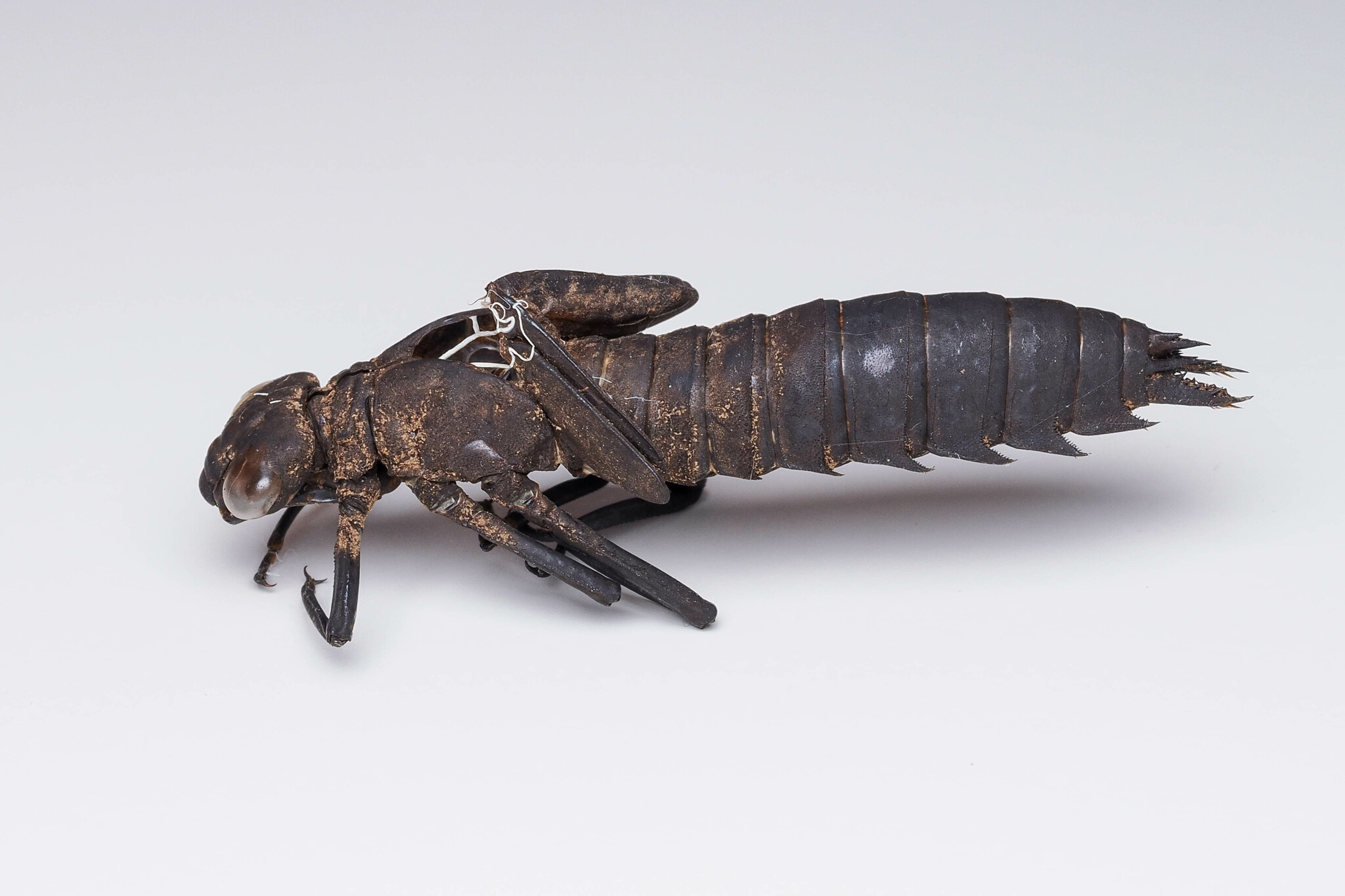
- Exuvia

Conservation status
- Least Concern (IUCN 3.1)

Scientific classification
- Kingdom: Animalia
- Phylum: Arthropoda
- Clade: Pancrustacea
- Class: Insecta
- Order: Odonata
- Suborder: Anisoptera
- Family: Aeshnidae
- Genus: Spinaeschna
- Species: S. watsoni

Binomial name
- Spinaeschna watsoni Theischinger, 1982

= Spinaeschna watsoni =

Tropical cascade darner

Species of dragonfly

Spinaeschna watsoni is a species of dragonfly in the family Aeshnidae, known as the tropical cascade darner. It is a medium to large, dark brown dragonfly with greenish-yellow markings. It is endemic to north-eastern Australia, where it inhabits streams and rivers.

== Etymology ==
The genus name Spinaeschna is derived from the Latin spina ("thorn" or "spine"), combined with -aeschna, a suffix commonly used for dragonflies associated with the Aeshna group. The name likely refers to a large spine on the male appendages.

In 1982, Günther Theischinger named this species watsoni, an eponym honouring the entomologist Tony Watson (1935–1993), his friend and supporter.

== Gallery ==
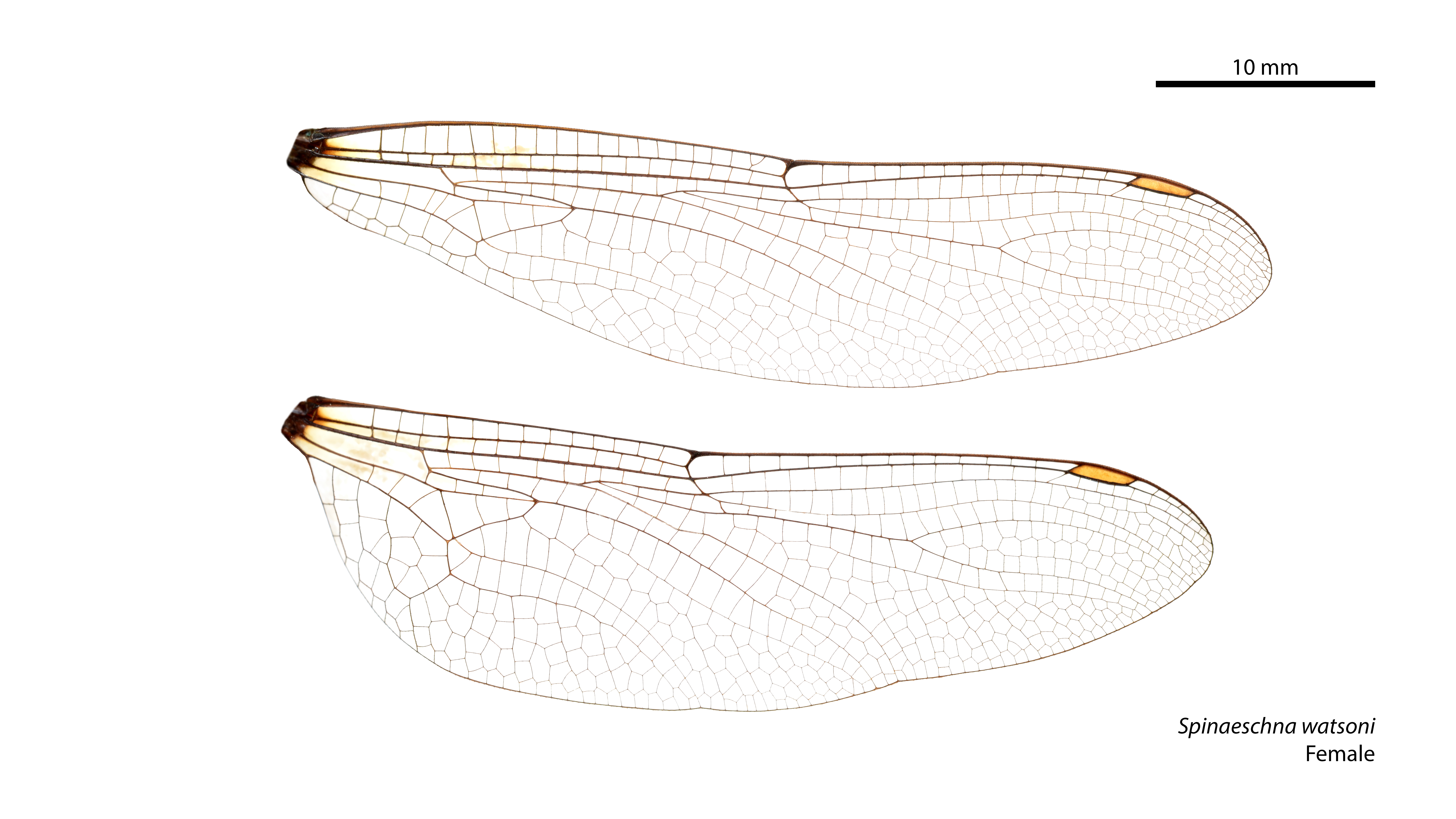
Female wings

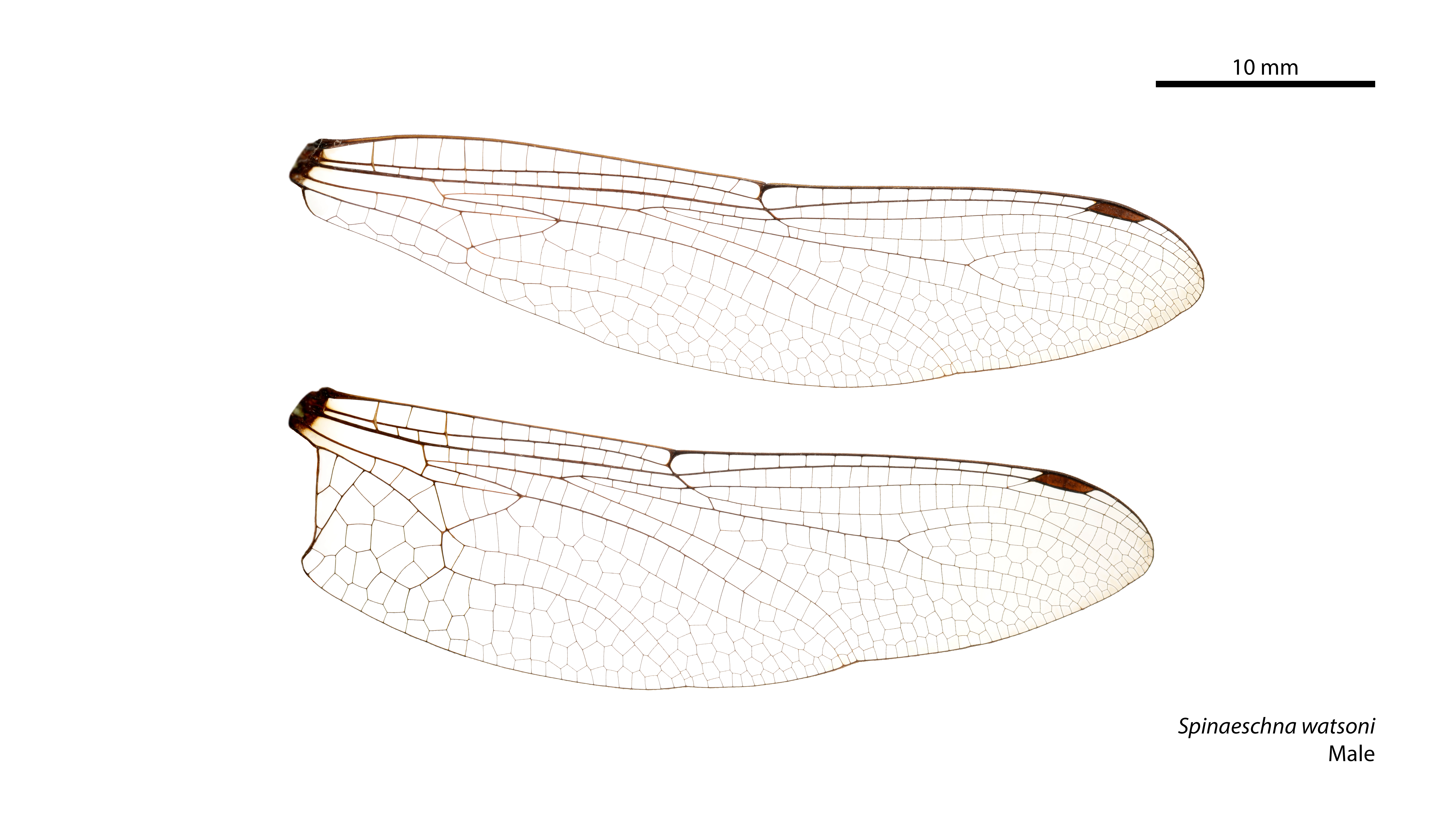
Male wings

== See also ==
- List of Odonata species of Australia
