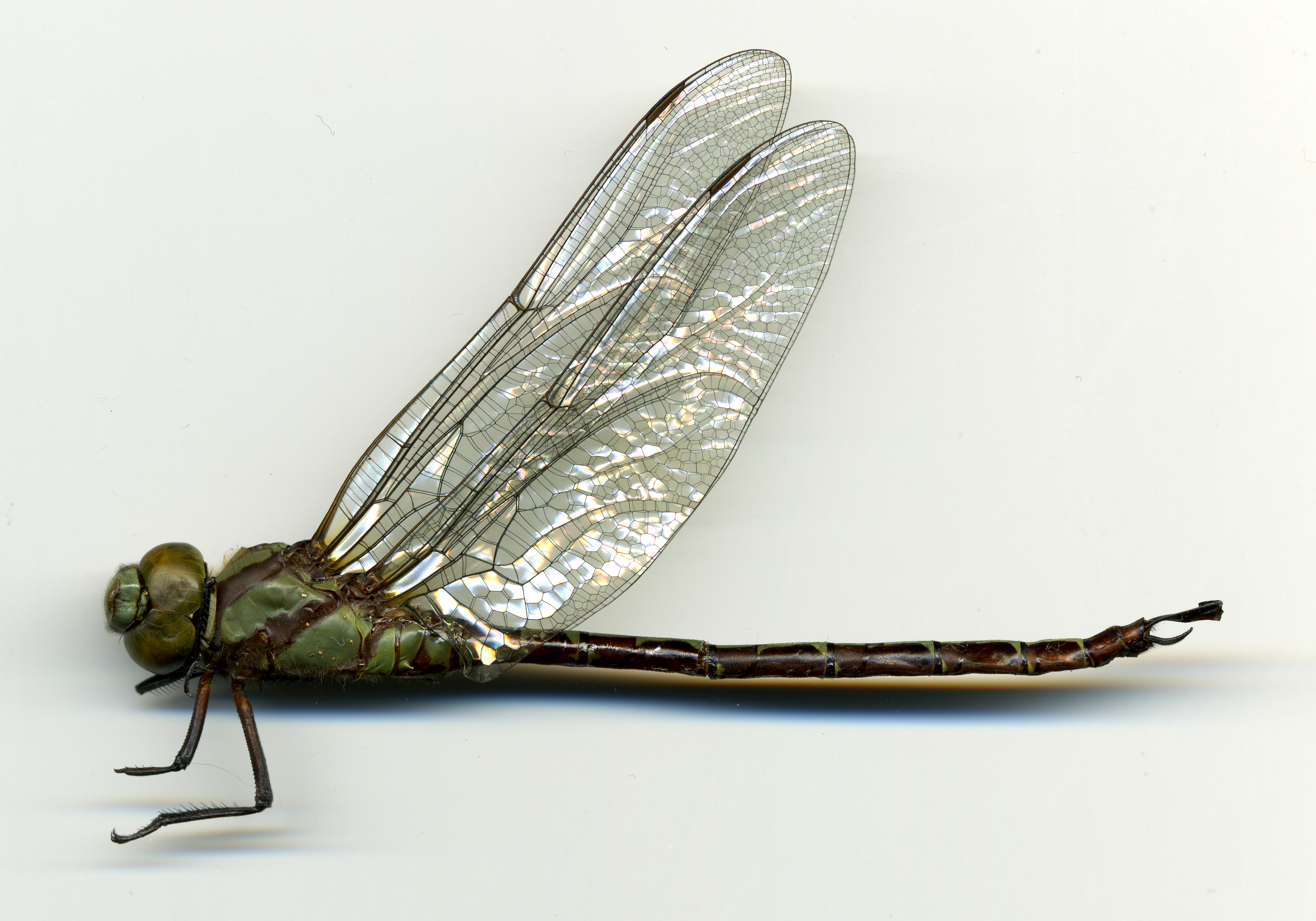

Conservation status
- Least Concern (IUCN 3.1)

Scientific classification
- Kingdom: Animalia
- Phylum: Arthropoda
- Class: Insecta
- Order: Odonata
- Infraorder: Anisoptera
- Family: Aeshnidae
- Genus: Remartinia
- Species: R. luteipennis

Binomial name
- Remartinia luteipennis (Burmeister, 1839)

= Remartinia luteipennis =

Species of dragonfly

Remartinia luteipennis, the malachite darner, is a species of darner in the dragonfly family Aeshnidae. It is found in Central America, North America, and South America.

The IUCN conservation status of Remartinia luteipennis is "LC", least concern, with no immediate threat to the species' survival. The population is stable. The IUCN status was reviewed in 2017.

== Subspecies ==
These three subspecies belong to the species Remartinia luteipennis:

- Remartinia luteipennis florida (Hagen, 1861)
- Remartinia luteipennis luteipennis (Burmeister, 1839)
- Remartinia luteipennis peninsularis (Calvert, 1941)
