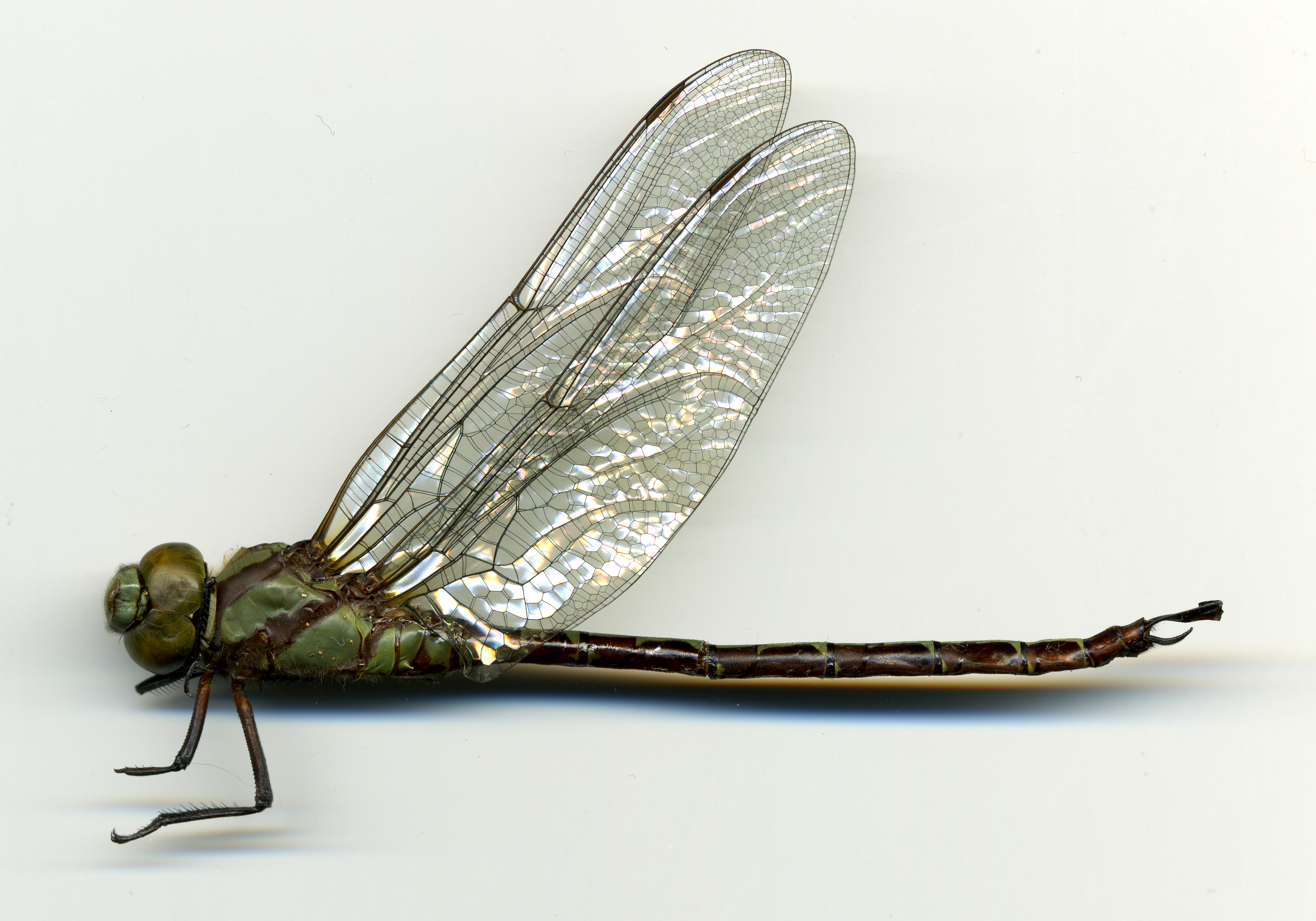
- Remartinia luteipennis

Scientific classification
- Kingdom: Animalia
- Phylum: Arthropoda
- Clade: Pancrustacea
- Class: Insecta
- Order: Odonata
- Infraorder: Anisoptera
- Family: Aeshnidae
- Genus: Remartinia; Navás, 1911

= Remartinia =

Genus of dragonflies

Remartinia is a genus of darners in the dragonfly family Aeshnidae. There are at least four described species in Remartinia.

== Species ==
These four species belong to the genus Remartinia:

- Remartinia luteipennis (Burmeister, 1839) (malachite darner)
- Remartinia restricta Carvalho, 1992
- Remartinia rufipennis (Kennedy, 1941)
- Remartinia secreta (Calvert, 1952)
