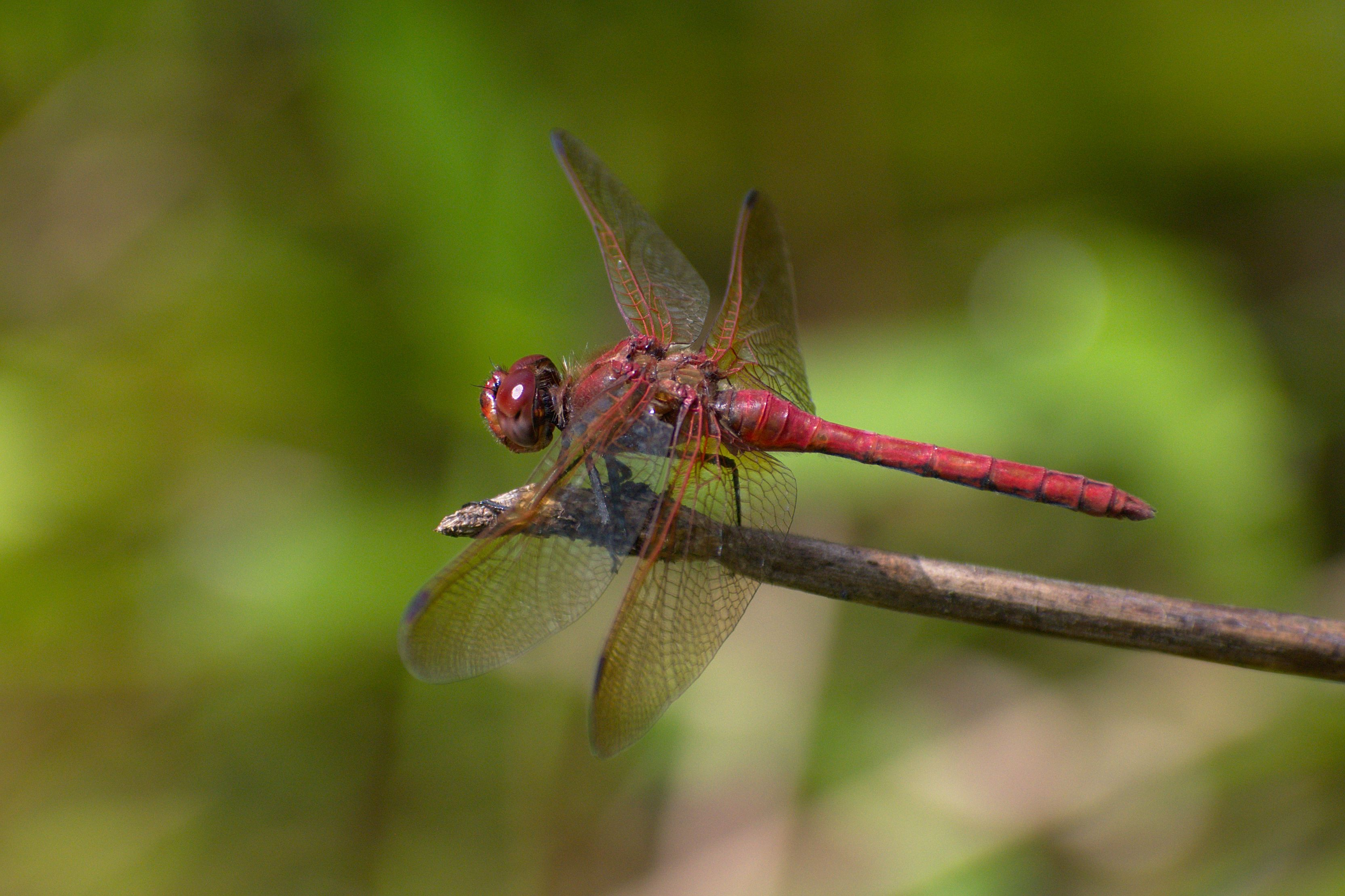

Conservation status
- Least Concern (IUCN 3.1)

Scientific classification
- Kingdom: Animalia
- Phylum: Arthropoda
- Clade: Pancrustacea
- Class: Insecta
- Order: Odonata
- Infraorder: Anisoptera
- Family: Libellulidae
- Genus: Sympetrum
- Species: S. madidum

Binomial name
- Sympetrum madidum Hagen (1861)

Synonyms
- Sympetrum chrysopteron (Selys, 1883); Sympetrum flavicosta (Hagen, 1875)

= Sympetrum madidum =

Species of dragonfly

Sympetrum madidum, the red-veined meadowhawk, is a species of dragonfly in the family Libellulidae.

== Identification ==
=== Adult ===
The red-veined meadowhawk is a medium-sized dragonfly, but it is large for its genus, Sympetrum. It has a length of 1 5/8 to 1 13/16 inches (40 to 45 mm). The abdomen of the red-veined meadowhawk is quite slender. The red-veined meadowhawk is distinguished from other Sympetrum species by the gold to red clouding of its wings and red wing veins. The male has red on the face and abdomen, while the thorax is dark and marked with two yellow spots on every side. The female is yellowish-brown. Every side of the thorax is marked with a pair of yellowish white stripes, and the top of the abdomen is marked with horizontal and vertical lines, giving it a "plaid" appearance.

=== Naiad ===
The naiad of the red-veined meadowhawk is small in size with a length of 5/8 inch (16 mm). The color of the naiad is mottled green and brown. Its abdomen has several slender, slightly curved hooks along the top, and the last two abdominal segments have a single, rear-facing spine on every side. Red-veined meadowhawk naiads and striped meadowhawk naiads are extremely difficult to tell apart.

== Distribution ==
- United States: (Alaska • California • Colorado • Iowa • Idaho • Missouri • Montana • Nebraska • North Dakota • Oregon • Washington • Wyoming)
- Canada: (Alberta • British Columbia • Manitoba • Northwest Territories • Nunavut • Saskatchewan • Yukon)

== Habitat ==
This species of dragonfly can be found along shallow, marshy ponds and lakes.

== Flight season ==
The red-veined meadowhawk is commonly active from mid-June to mid-September. It also flies from April to September.

== Diet ==
=== Adult ===
Red-veined meadowhawks will eat almost any soft-bodied flying insect such as mosquitoes, flies, small moths, mayflies, and flying ants or termites.

=== Naiad ===
Naiads of red-veined meadowhawk will feed on a wide variety of aquatic insects, including mosquito larvae, other aquatic fly larvae, mayfly larvae, and freshwater shrimp. They will sometimes eat very small fish and tadpoles.

== Ecology ==
The naiads of the red-veined meadowhawk live in debris on the bottom of ponds and lakes. Naiads can develop in ephemeral sites. They don't actively pursue prey but will wait for it to pass by, a strategy which affords them protection from other predators. Naiads will emerge as adult dragonflies when it's night. Adults of red-veined meadowhawks are believed to fly mostly from mid-June to mid-September. They also fly at different times of the year. This dragonfly species hunts for flying insects from rocks or bare branches. The genus which red-veined meadowhawks are in which is Sympetrum. This Latin word means "with rock" and refers to their habit of basking on rocks to absorb heat early in the day. This dragonfly seems to be relatively uncommon over most of its distribution. Sympetrum madidum is not the most known of Sympetrum species.

== Reproduction ==
The female flies with the male still attached after mating in a position called in tandem. The female will lay her eggs in shallow lakes and ponds by dipping the tip her abdomen on the surface of the water.

== Similar species ==
The red-veined meadowhawk is similar to the cardinal meadowhawk which has black in its wings at base, no black underside, and reddish legs.
