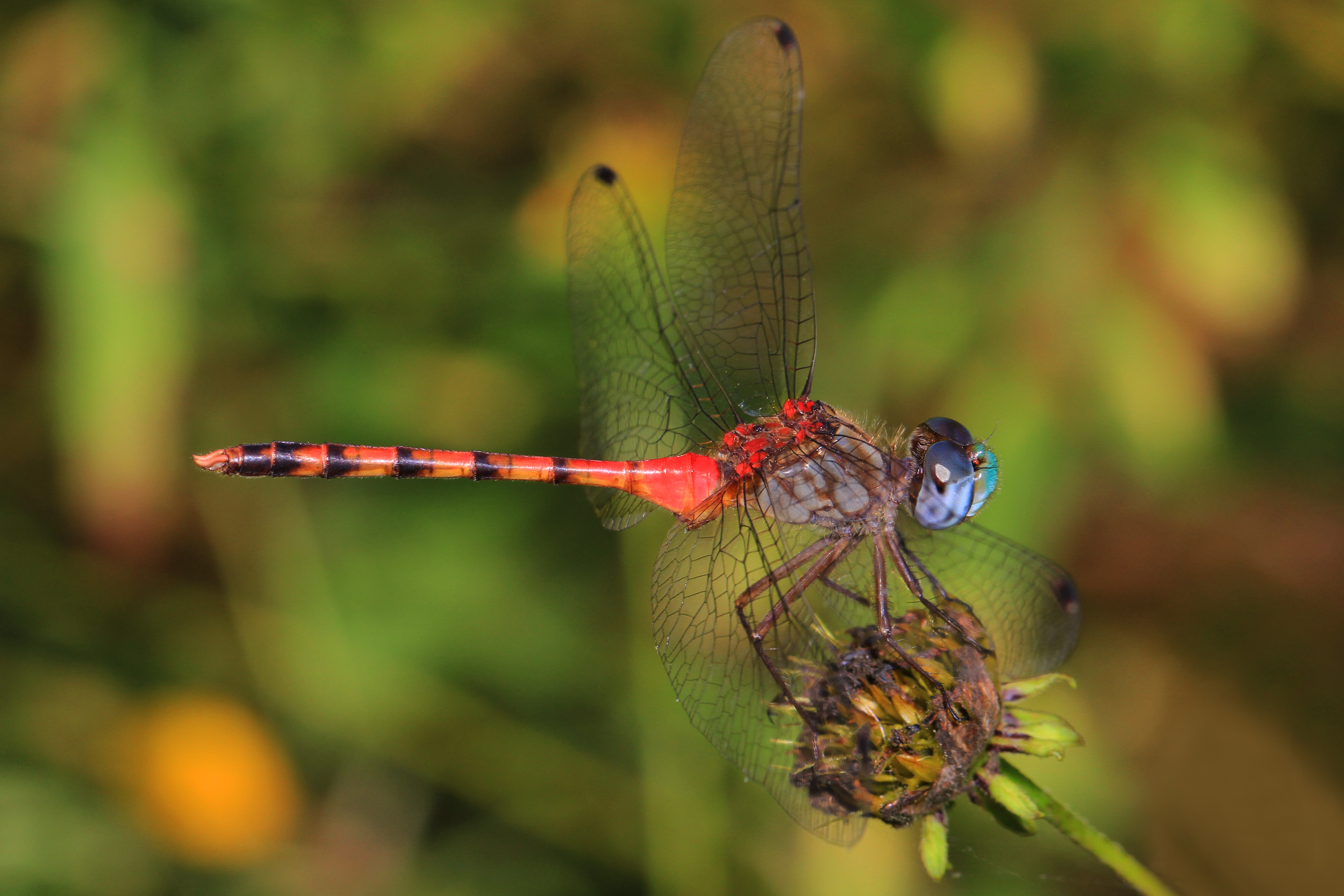

Conservation status
- Least Concern (IUCN 3.1)

Scientific classification
- Kingdom: Animalia
- Phylum: Arthropoda
- Class: Insecta
- Order: Odonata
- Infraorder: Anisoptera
- Family: Libellulidae
- Genus: Sympetrum
- Species: S. ambiguum

Binomial name
- Sympetrum ambiguum (Rambur, 1842)
- Range of S. ambiguum

= Sympetrum ambiguum =

Species of dragonfly

Sympetrum ambiguum, the blue-faced meadowhawk, is a dragonfly of the family Libellulidae.

== Description ==
The aqua blue face of the blue-faced, green/turquoise when dead meadowhawk may not be obvious to a casual observer, but it is an important field mark distinguishing it from similar-looking meadowhawks in the genus Sympetrum, such as Sympetrum vicinum. This small dragonfly reaches a maximum total length of 38 mm. The thorax is grayish or olive brown. A mature male has a bright red abdomen, with black stripes; in females and juveniles, it remains brown. Both genders have six black rings on their abdomens. They can be found from summer through fall in Midwest North America close to water sources.
