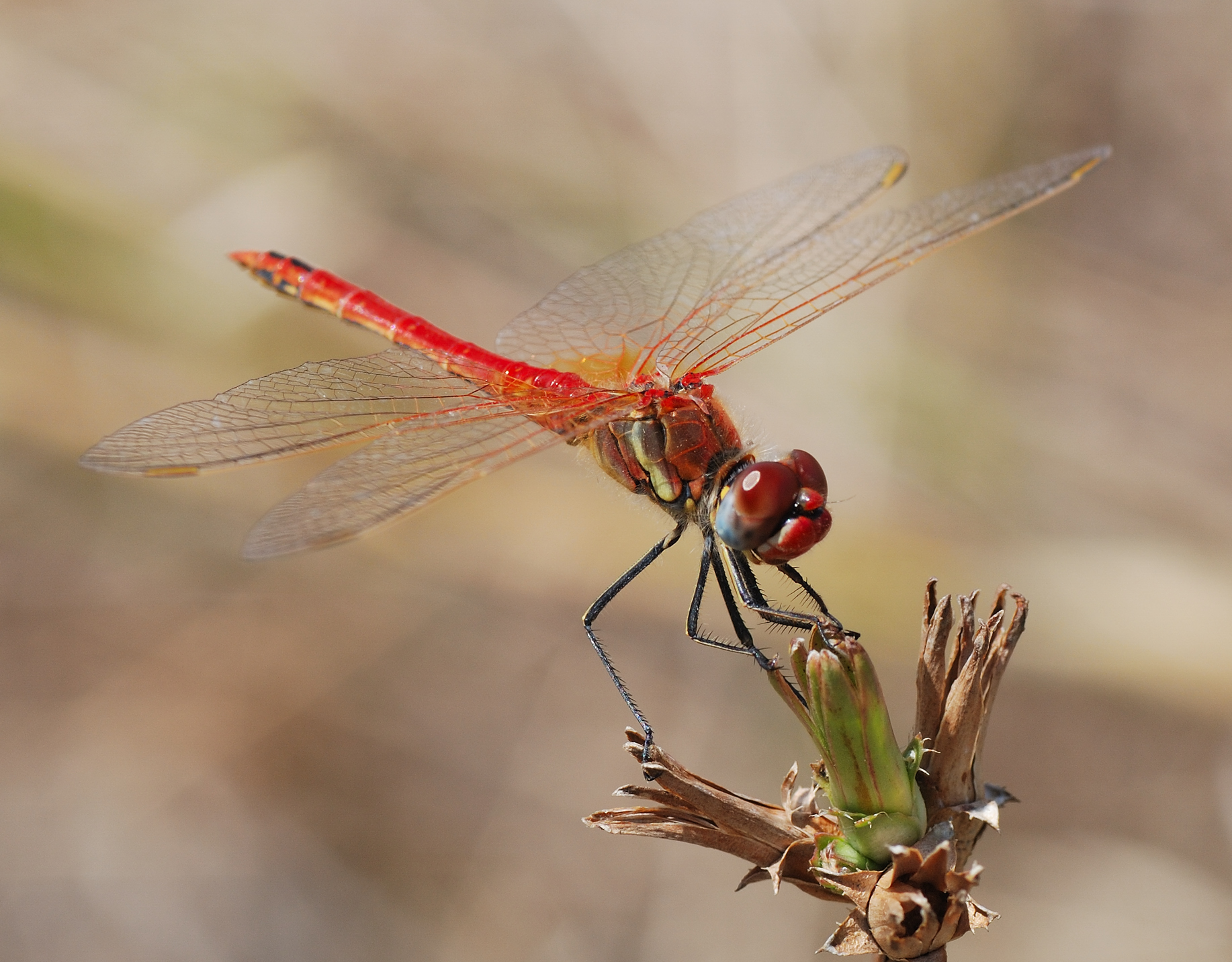
- Male
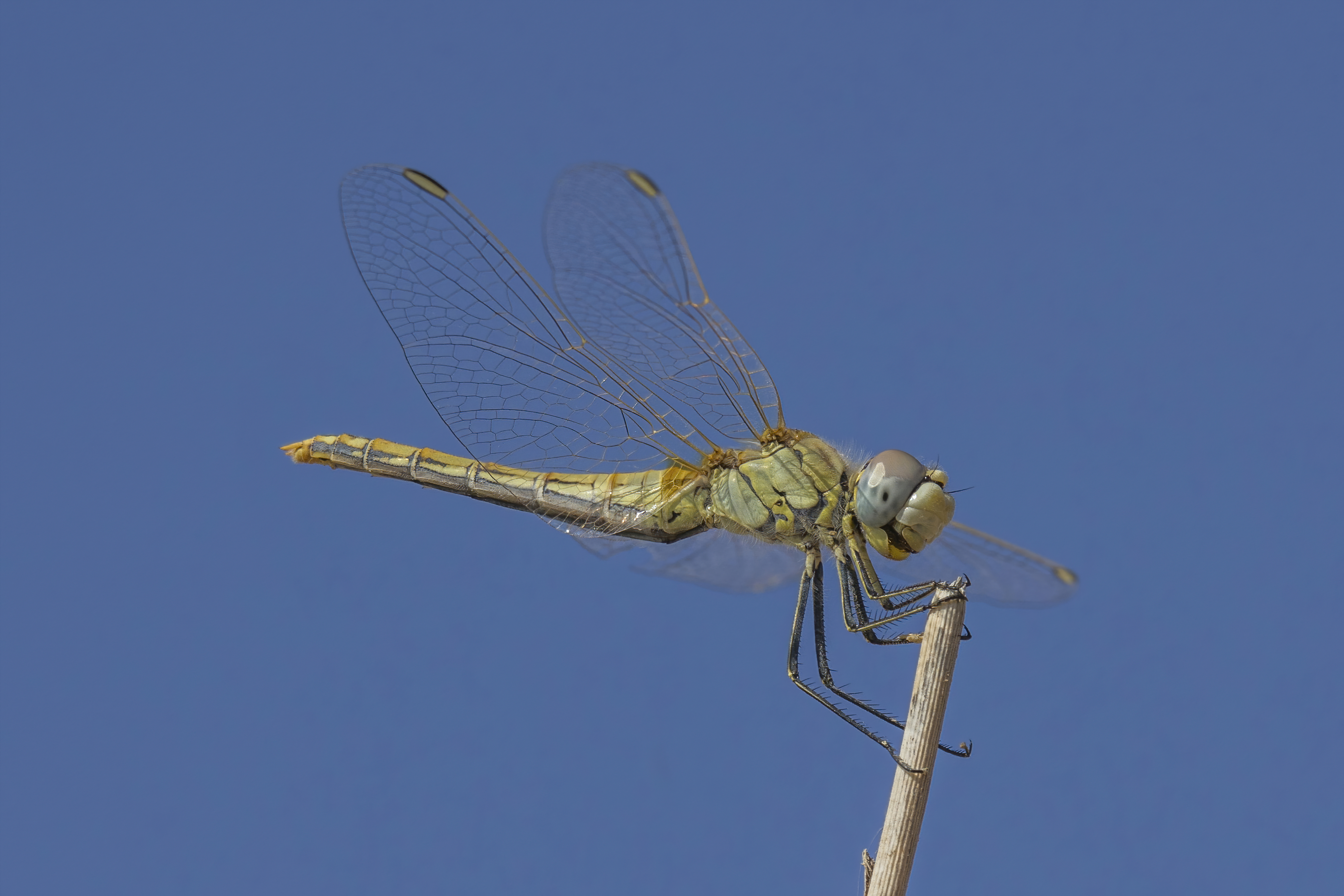
- Female

Conservation status
- Least Concern (IUCN 3.1)

Scientific classification
- Kingdom: Animalia
- Phylum: Arthropoda
- Clade: Pancrustacea
- Class: Insecta
- Order: Odonata
- Suborder: Anisoptera
- Superfamily: Libelluloidea
- Family: Libellulidae
- Genus: Sympetrum
- Species: S. fonscolombii

Binomial name
- Sympetrum fonscolombii (Selys, 1840)

Synonyms
- Sympetrum fonscolombei Selys, 1840

= Red-veined darter =

Species of dragonfly

The red-veined darter or nomad (Sympetrum fonscolombii) is a dragonfly in the genus Sympetrum.

== Taxonomy ==
There is genetic and behavioural evidence that S. fonscolombii is not closely related to the other members of the genus Sympetrum and it will at some time in the future be removed from this genus.

== Etymology ==
Sympetrum fonscolombii was named under the protonym Libellula fonscolombii by the Belgian entomologist Edmond de Sélys Longchamps in 1840, in honour of the French entomologist Étienne de Fonscolombe, whence the species name. Its name is sometimes cited as fonscolombei instead of fonscolombii, but Askew (2004) gives the latter as the correct spelling.

== Distribution ==
Sympetrum fonscolombii is a widespread and common species in much of central and southern Europe including most Mediterranean islands, North Africa, the Middle East, Mongolia, south-western Asia, including the Indian subcontinent, the Indian Ocean Islands and Sri Lanka. In Europe it is resident in the south of its range but in some years it migrates northward. From the 1990s onwards, it has increasingly been found in northwest Europe, including Belgium, Sweden, Finland, Poland, Great Britain, and Ireland. It is the only species in the family Libellulidae to be found in the Azores, and it is also found on the Canary Islands and Madeira.

== Habitat ==
It breeds in a wide range of habitats including marshes, lakes, ponds, permanent and seasonal rivers. It is able to recolonize dry areas after a rainfall.

== Identification ==
Sympetrum fonscolombii can reach a body length of 33–40 mm (1.3–1.6 in) with hindwings 26–31 mm (1.0–1.2 in) long. This species is similar to other Sympetrum species, with the red wing veins giving a positive identification, especially with a male.

Males have a red abdomen, redder than many other Sympetrum species. The frons and the thorax are red-brown. The eyes are brown above and blue/grey below. The wings have red veins and the wing bases of the hind-wings are yellow. The pterostigma is pale yellow with a border of black veins.

Female are similar but the abdomen is ochre yellow, not red, with two black lines along each side. The wings have yellow veins at the costa, leading edge and base, not red veins as found in the males. The legs of both sexes are mostly black with some yellow.

Immature males are like females but often with more red and a single line along each side of the abdomen.

Male S. fonscolombii can be mistaken for Crocothemis erythraea as both are very red dragonflies with yellow bases to the wings, red veins and pale pterostigma. However C. erythraea has no black on the legs, a broader body, and no black on the head. Also C. erythraea females do not oviposit in tandem. The overall structure of these two species is different, and with some experience are easy to tell apart.

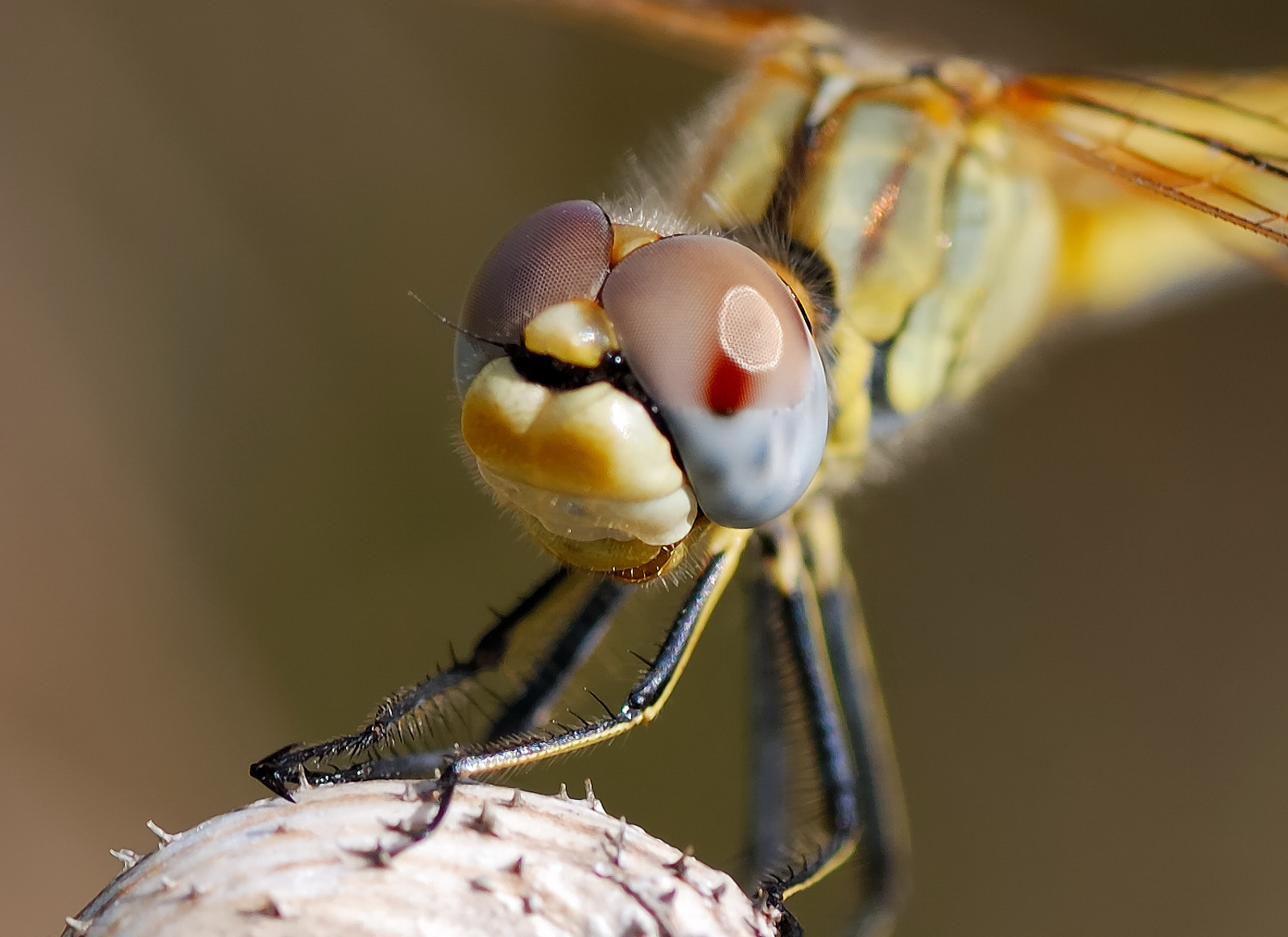
Head of female showing blue/grey underside of eyes and black and yellow legs

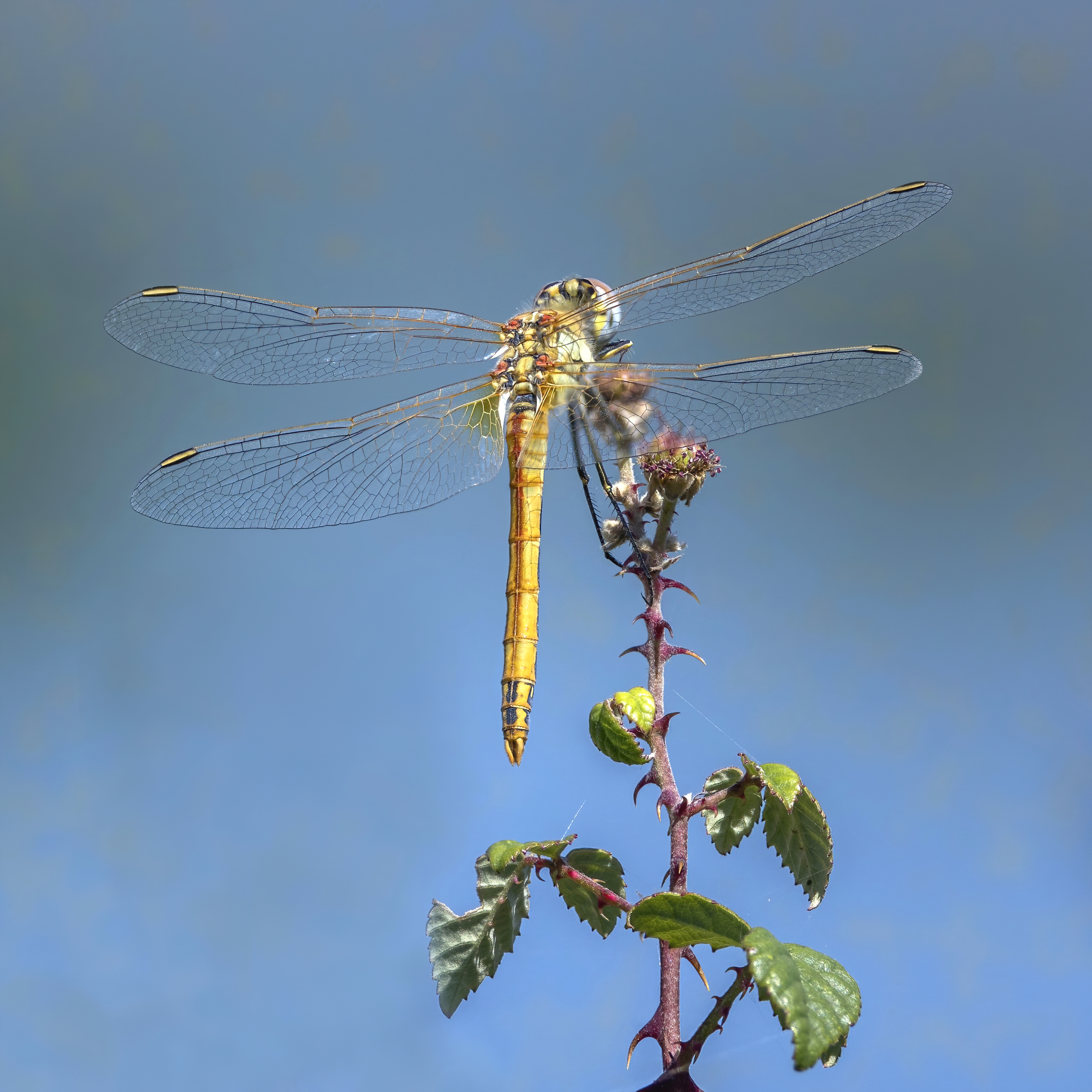
Immature male

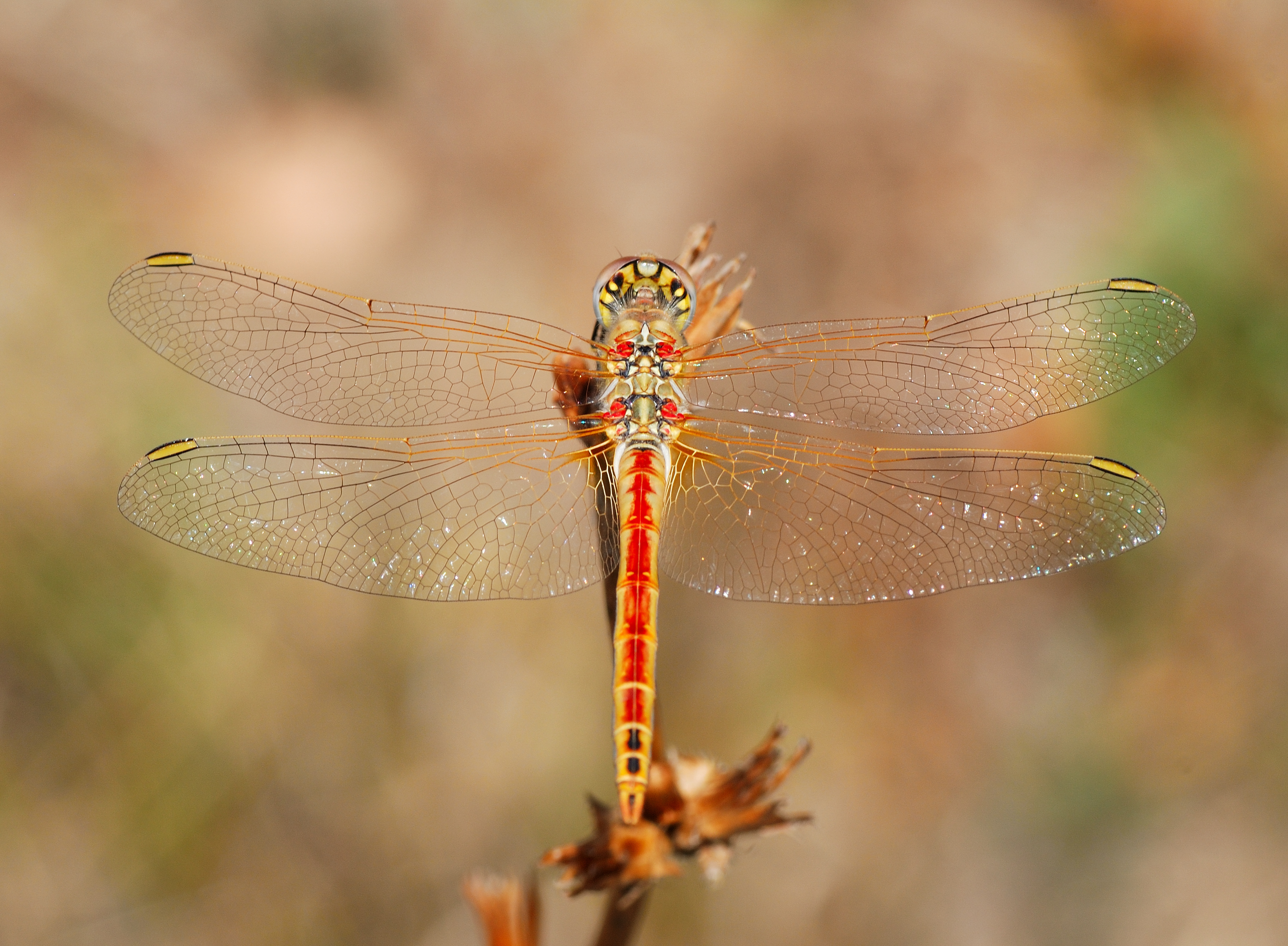
Male showing some red on abdomen

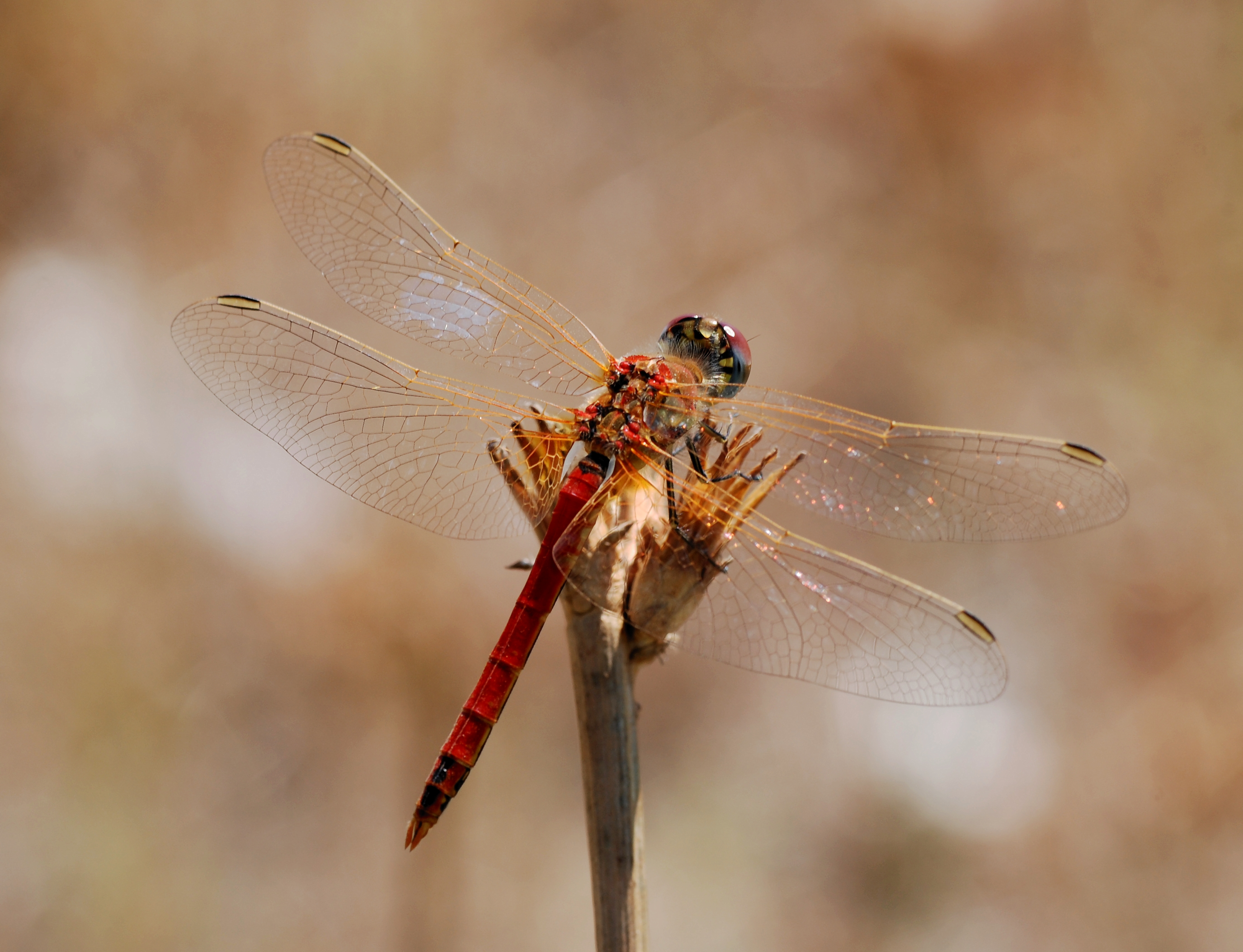
Mature male

== Biology and behaviour ==
Sympetrum fonscolombii can be seen on the wing throughout the year around the Mediterranean and in the south of its range; further north, its main flight period is May to October and it is scarce during the winter months. It is a territorial species with the males often sitting on an exposed perch.

After copulation the pair stay in tandem for egg laying and pairs can be seen over open water with the female dipping her abdomen into the water depositing eggs. Pairs are known to fly over the sea in tandem dipping into the salt water where the eggs soon perish. The eggs and larvae develop within a few months, and S. fonscolombii unlike most other European dragonflies, can have two generations per year in warmer regions. Some larvae overwinter.

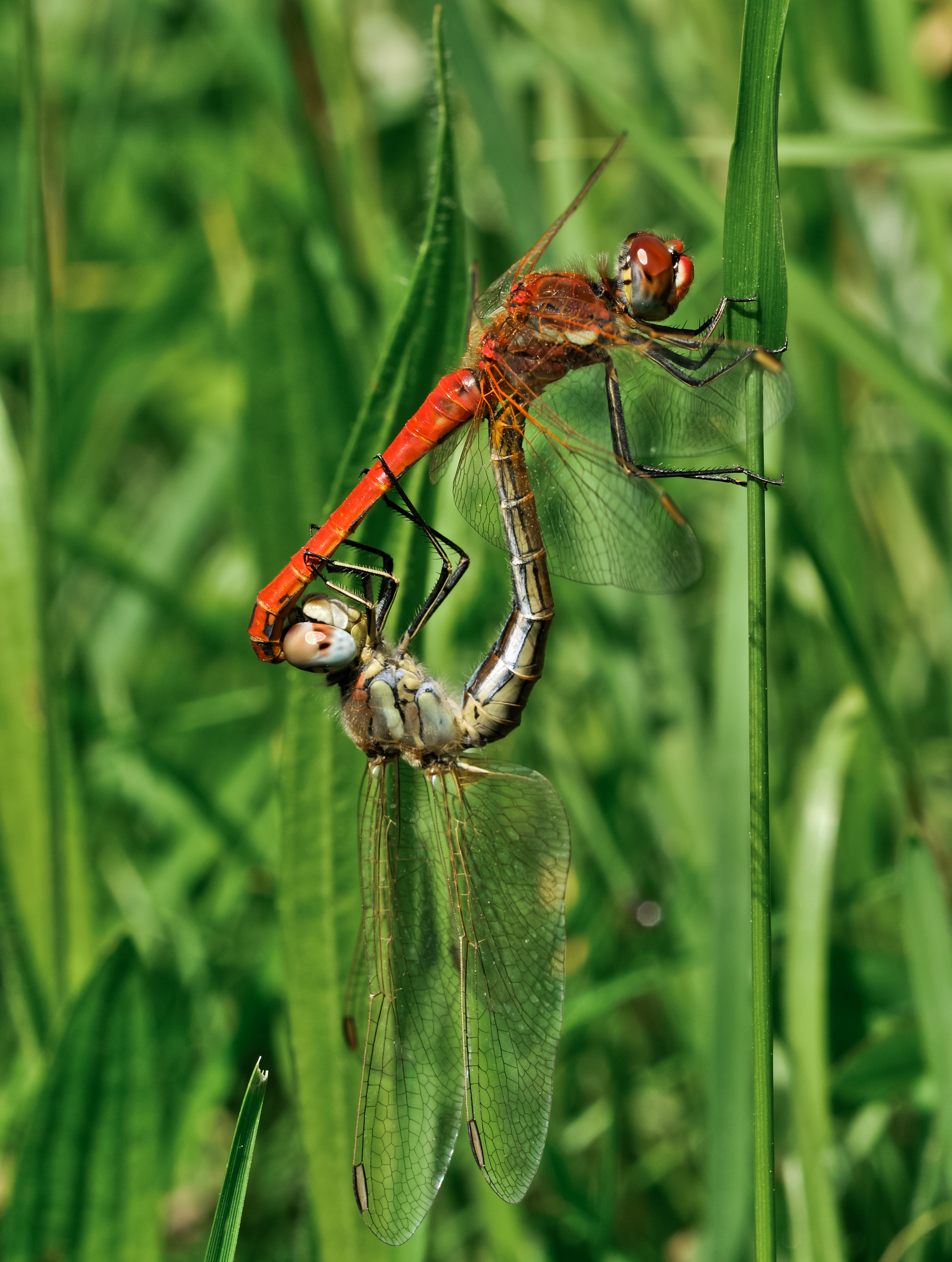
Mating wheel

ovipositing in tandem

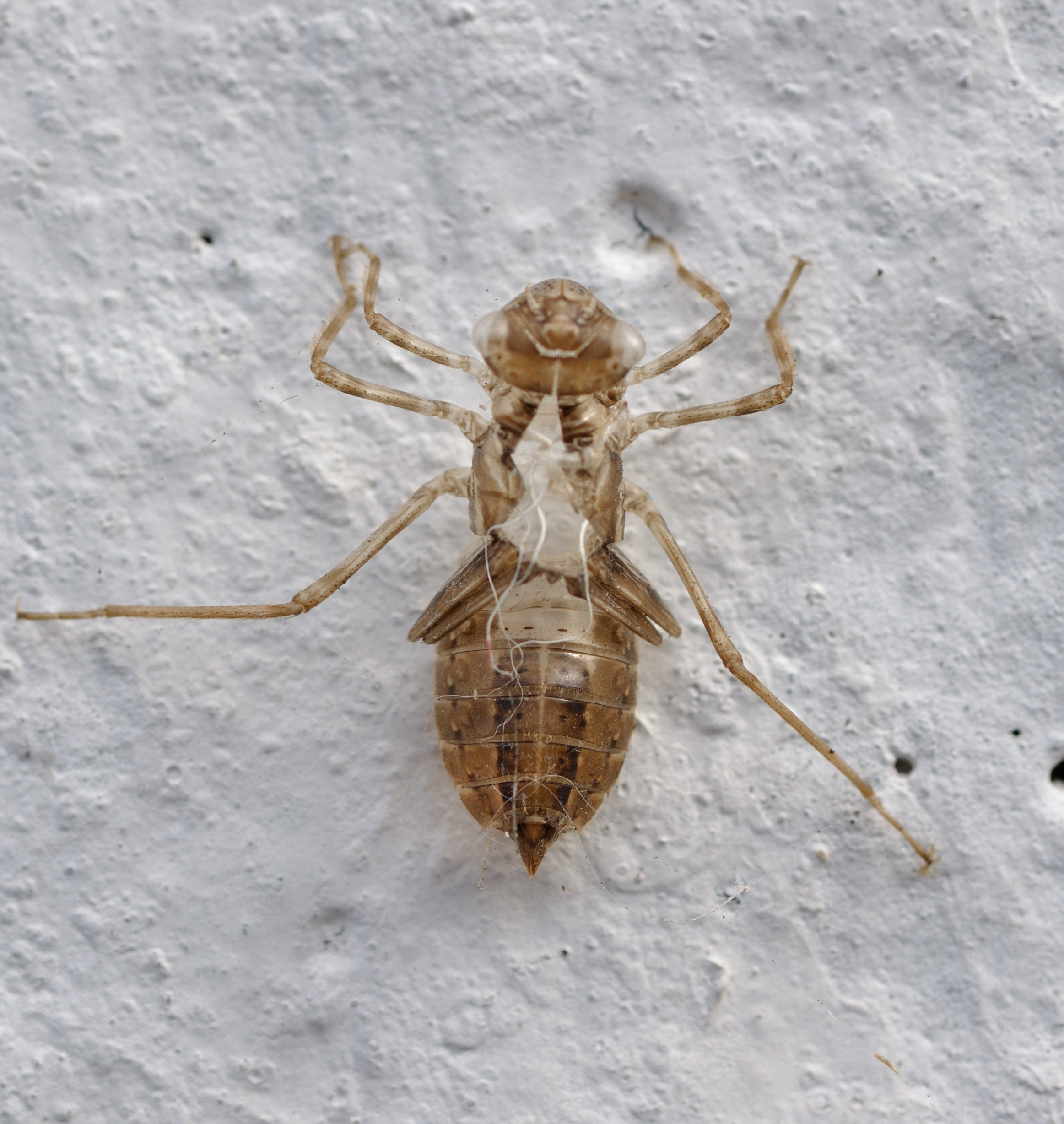
Exuvia
