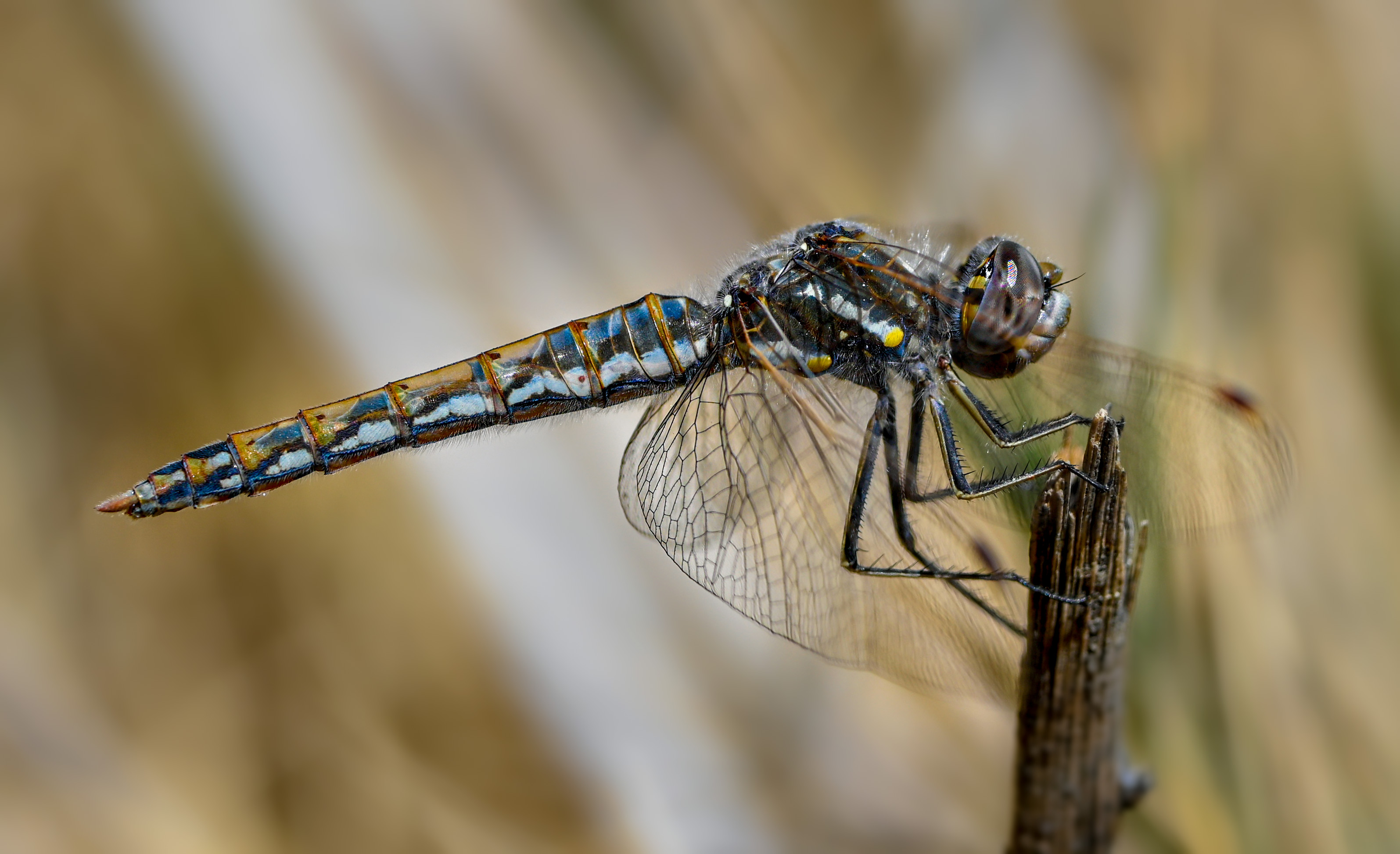

Conservation status
- Least Concern (IUCN 3.1)

Scientific classification
- Kingdom: Animalia
- Phylum: Arthropoda
- Class: Insecta
- Order: Odonata
- Infraorder: Anisoptera
- Family: Libellulidae
- Genus: Sympetrum
- Species: S. corruptum

Binomial name
- Sympetrum corruptum (Hagen, 1861)

= Variegated meadowhawk =

Species of dragonfly

The variegated meadowhawk (Sympetrum corruptum) is a dragonfly of the family Libellulidae, native to North America.

== Description ==
The variegated meadowhawk is a small to medium-sized dragonfly with a slender abdomen, often reaching a length of 1^{5}/_{8}" (41 mm) to 1^{11}/_{12}" (49 mm). The male is commonly dark brownish black with an abdomen of bright red, pink, and golden brown. The thorax may be marked with a pair of yellow dots on each side. The leading edges of the wings are marked with pinkish.

The females are similar in color but not as brightly colored, with gray and yellow replacing the red of the male. Young variegated meadowhawks are much paler and mottled with pale green, pale yellow, golden brown, and orange.

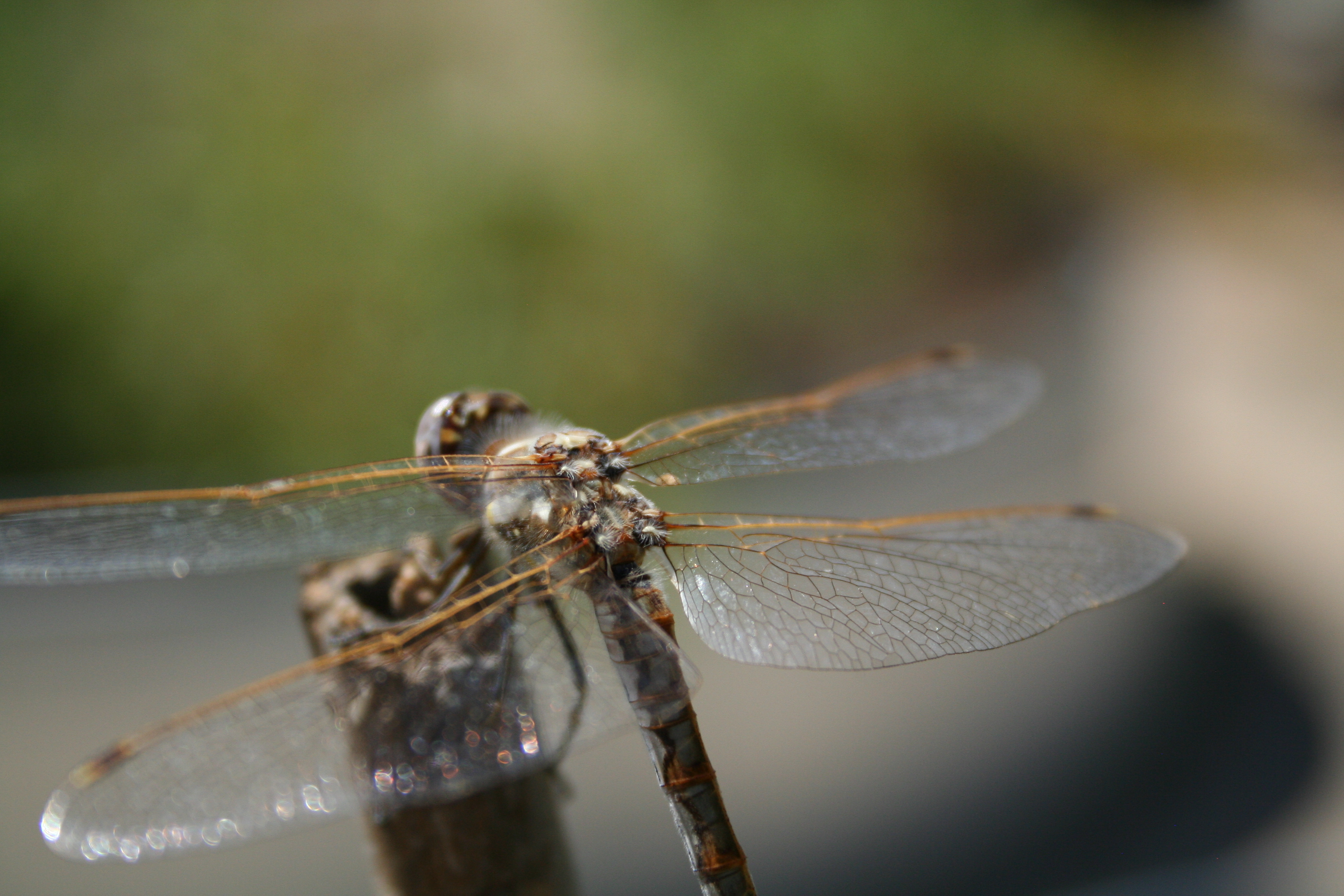
An up close view of a female Sympetrum corruptum, showing where the wings connect to the Synthorax.

== Range and migration ==
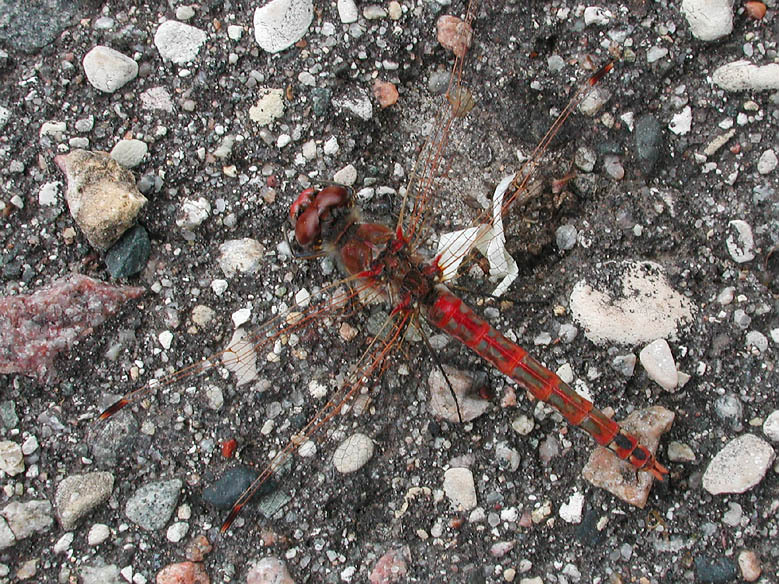
Itasca State Park, Minnesota

This species is found from British Columbia and Ontario areas south through much of the United States to southern California and Florida. It migrates as far south as Honduras, and as far west as eastern Asia.

Variegated meadowhawks live near ponds, lakes, and swamps.
