= Sympetrum dilatatum =

Conservation status
- Extinct (1963) (IUCN 3.1)

Scientific classification
- Kingdom: Animalia
- Phylum: Arthropoda
- Class: Insecta
- Order: Odonata
- Infraorder: Anisoptera
- Family: Libellulidae
- Genus: Sympetrum
- Species: †S. dilatatum

Binomial name
- †Sympetrum dilatatum (Calvert, 1892)

Species of dragonfly

Sympetrum dilatatum, the St. Helena darter, was a species of dragonfly in the family Libellulidae. It was endemic to Saint Helena. In 2021, it was declared extinct by the IUCN. There have been no recorded sightings since 1963 and it is no longer present at the only two locations it was previously found at.
