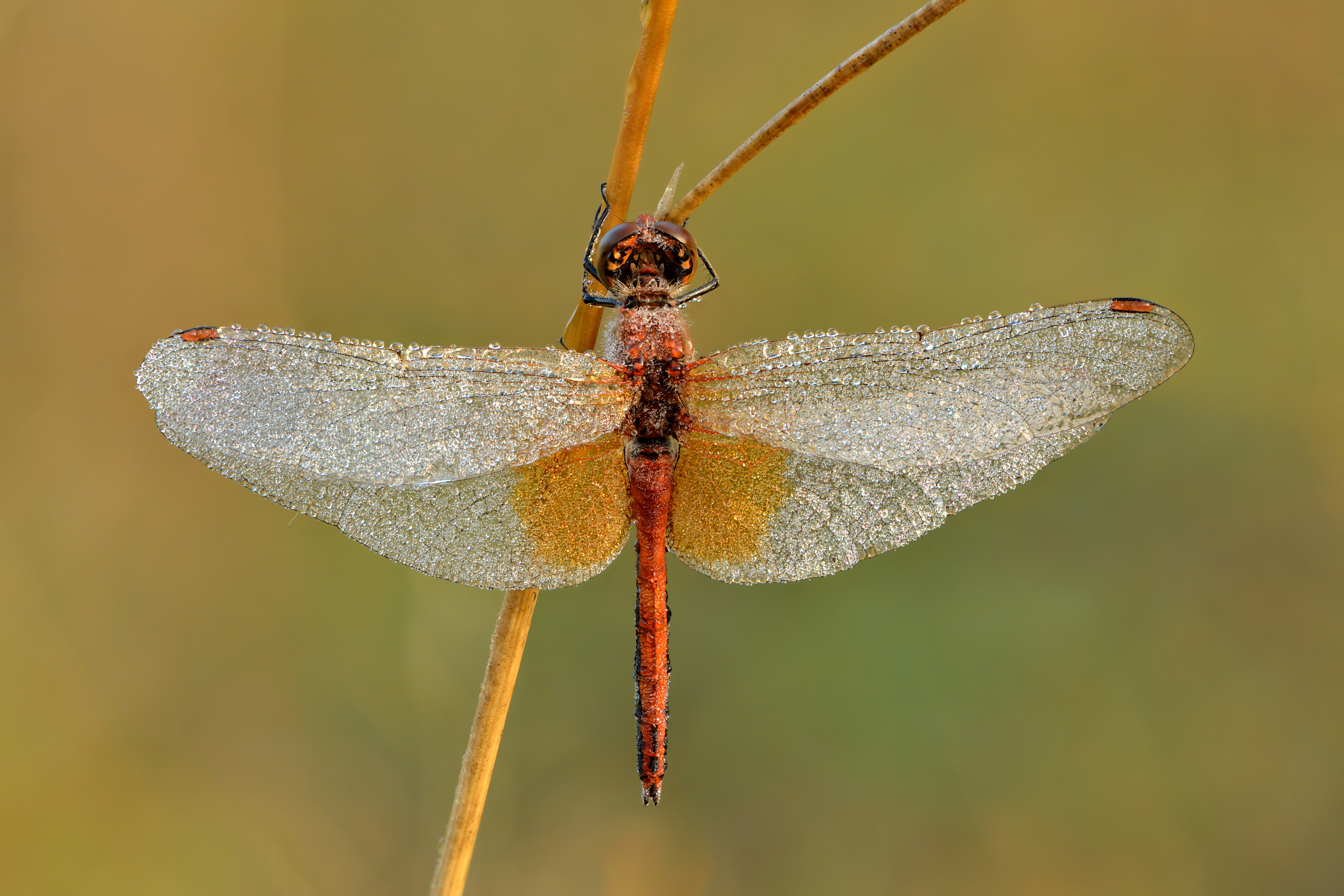
- Male
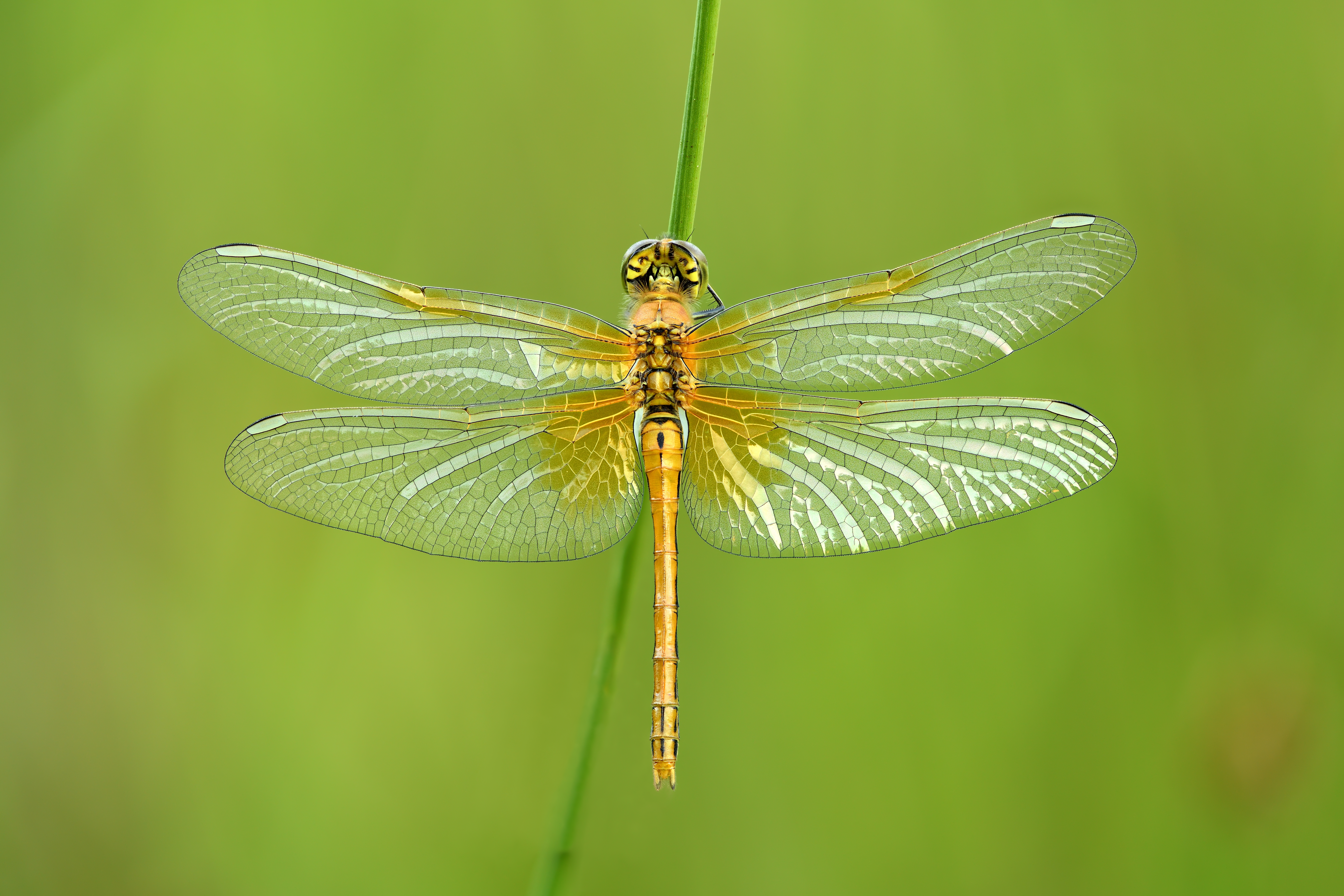
- Female

Conservation status
- Endangered (IUCN 3.1)

Scientific classification
- Kingdom: Animalia
- Phylum: Arthropoda
- Clade: Pancrustacea
- Class: Insecta
- Order: Odonata
- Suborder: Anisoptera
- Superfamily: Libelluloidea
- Family: Libellulidae
- Genus: Sympetrum
- Species: S. flaveolum

Binomial name
- Sympetrum flaveolum (Linnaeus, 1758)

= Yellow-winged darter =

Species of dragonfly

The yellow-winged darter (Sympetrum flaveolum) is a dragonfly found in Europe and mid and northern China. Breeding is confined to stagnant water, usually in peat bogs. Although not resident in the United Kingdom it occasionally migrates there in some numbers. Such 'Invasion Years' occurred in 1906, 1926, 1945, 1953, and 1995. On each occasion a small breeding colony appeared, but they have invariably died out after a few years.

An almost unmistakable darter, red-bodied in the male, with both sexes having large amounts of saffron-yellow colouration to the basal area of each wing, which is particularly noticeable on the hind-wings. Other Sympetrum species may have limited yellow-orange colouration near the extreme wing-bases, especially in females, but never so extensively as in this species.

Sites which are likely to attract this species have thick rushy margins. The yellow-winged darter tends to make quite short flights when settled at a site, and frequently perches quite low down on vegetation.

The yellow-winged darter has bred but is not established in the UK. It has occurred in Cumbria as single individuals on very few occasions. The most recent record was at Killington Reservoir in August 1995.

In Southern Europe, the nymphs of this dragonfly live in oligotrophic lakes with submerged vegetation, at high altitudes. As an abundant predator, the species has an important role in food chains of high altitude lakes.
