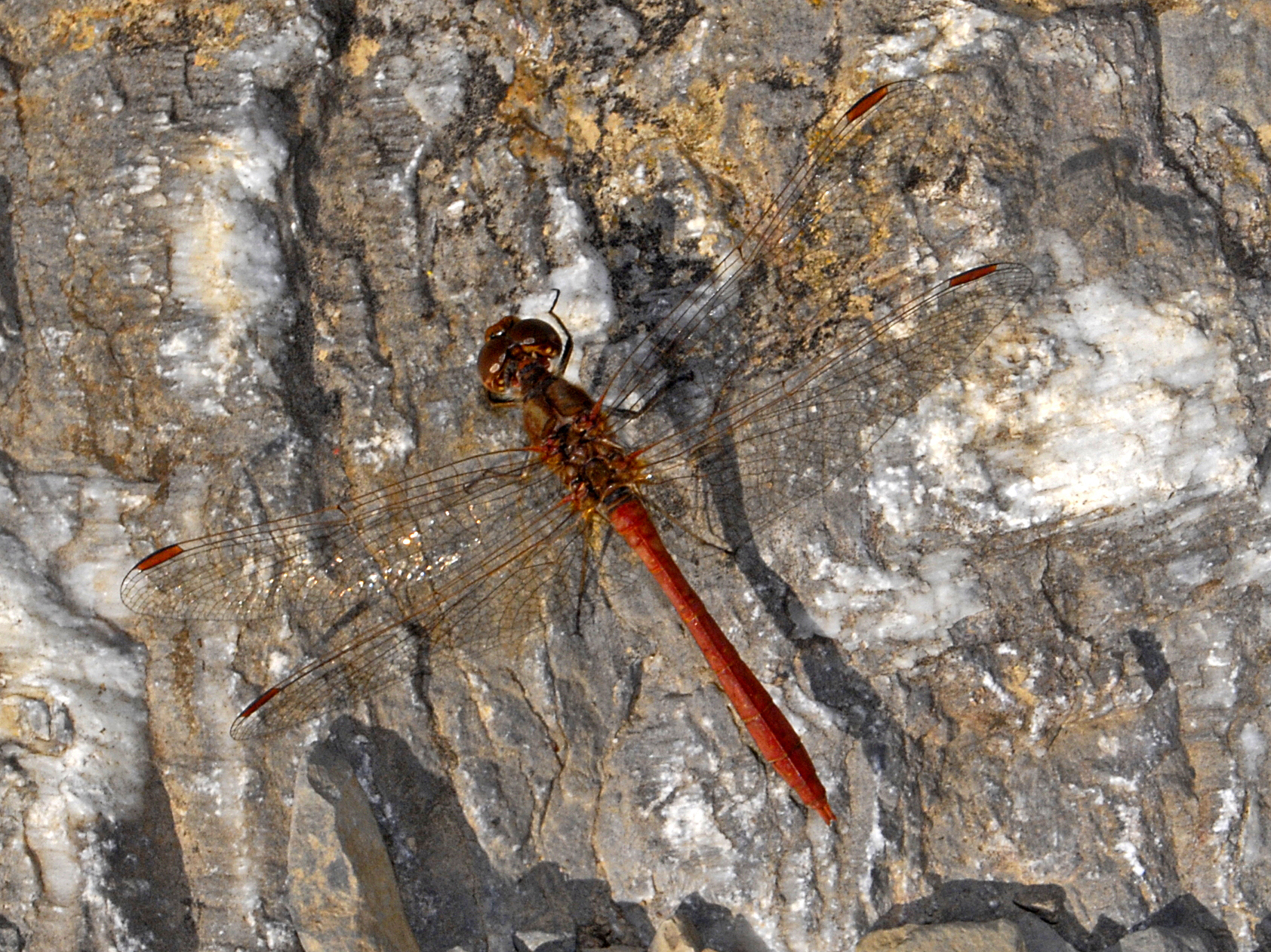
- Male of Sympetrum meridionale
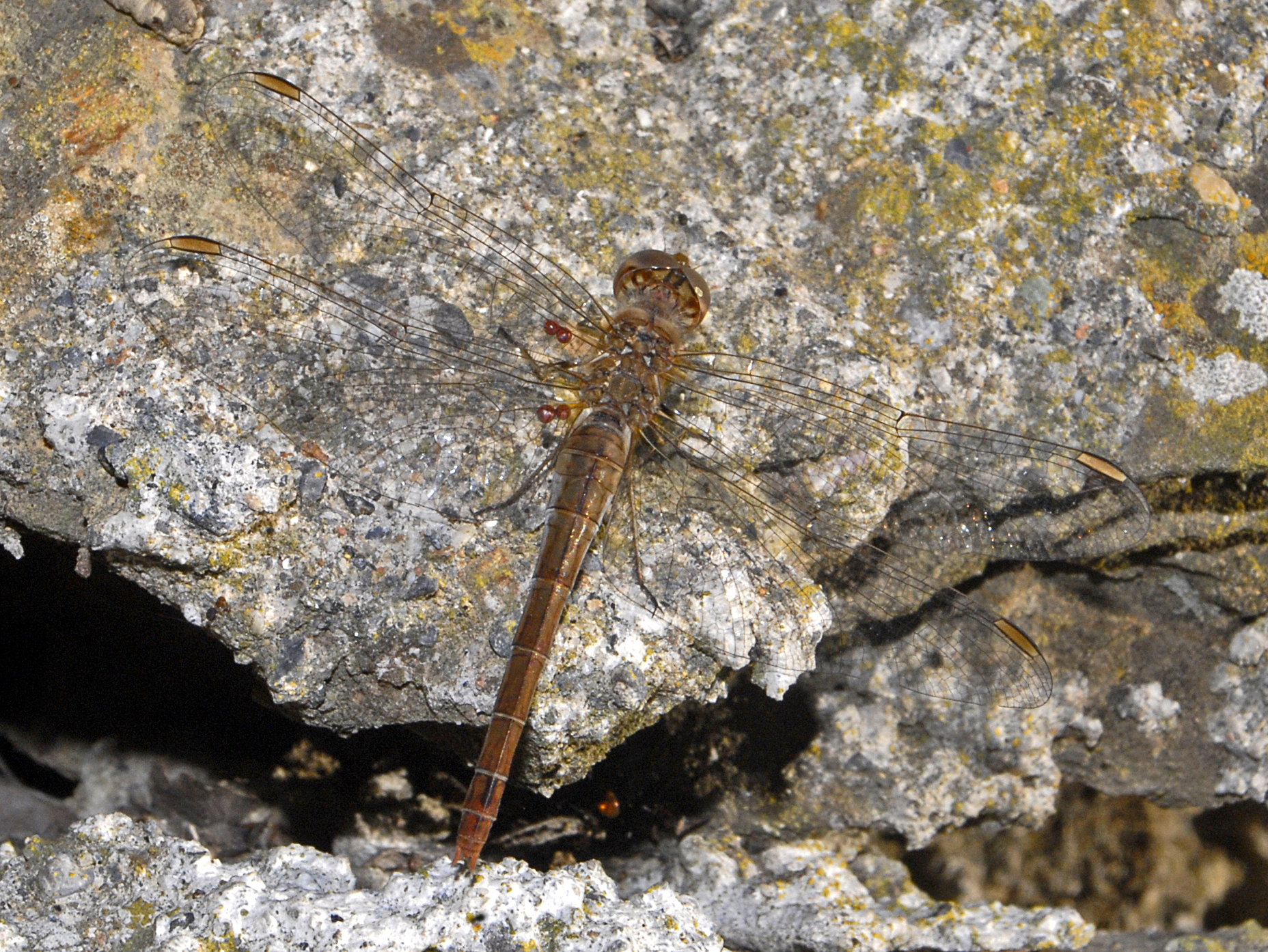
- Female of Sympetrum meridionale, with mites on the left wings

Conservation status
- Least Concern (IUCN 3.1)

Scientific classification
- Kingdom: Animalia
- Phylum: Arthropoda
- Class: Insecta
- Order: Odonata
- Infraorder: Anisoptera
- Family: Libellulidae
- Genus: Sympetrum
- Species: S. meridionale

Binomial name
- Sympetrum meridionale (Selys, 1841)

Synonyms
- Libellula meridionalis Selys, 1841

= Sympetrum meridionale =

Species of dragonfly

Sympetrum meridionale, the southern darter, is a species of dragonfly belonging to the Skimmer family Libellulidae.

== Description ==
The adults grow up to 35–40 millimetres (1.4–1.6 in) long. The wingspan reaches 52–60 millimetres (2.0–2.4 in).

The abdomen of adult males is orange-reddish, without black spots on segments. The sides of the thorax are yellowish-brown. The adult females are quite similar to males, but the background color is more yellow. The wings are hyaline, with yellow or pale brown pterostigma.

== Life cycle and behavior ==
Their life cycle lasts two or three years. They can be encountered from May through mid October in the immediate vicinity of shallow, well vegetated still water, where the larvae develop.

== Distribution ==
This species is present in most of southern Europe.
