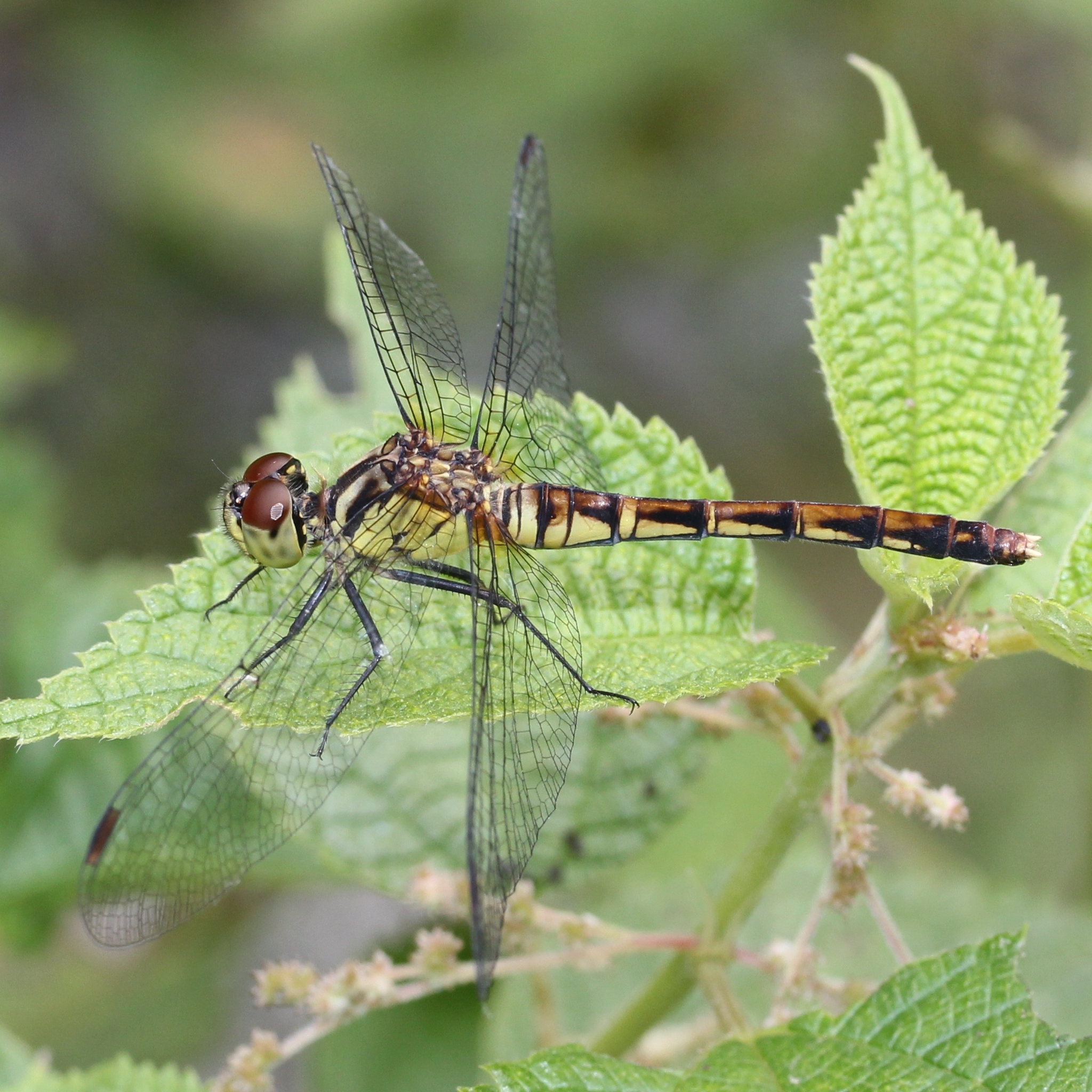
- Female
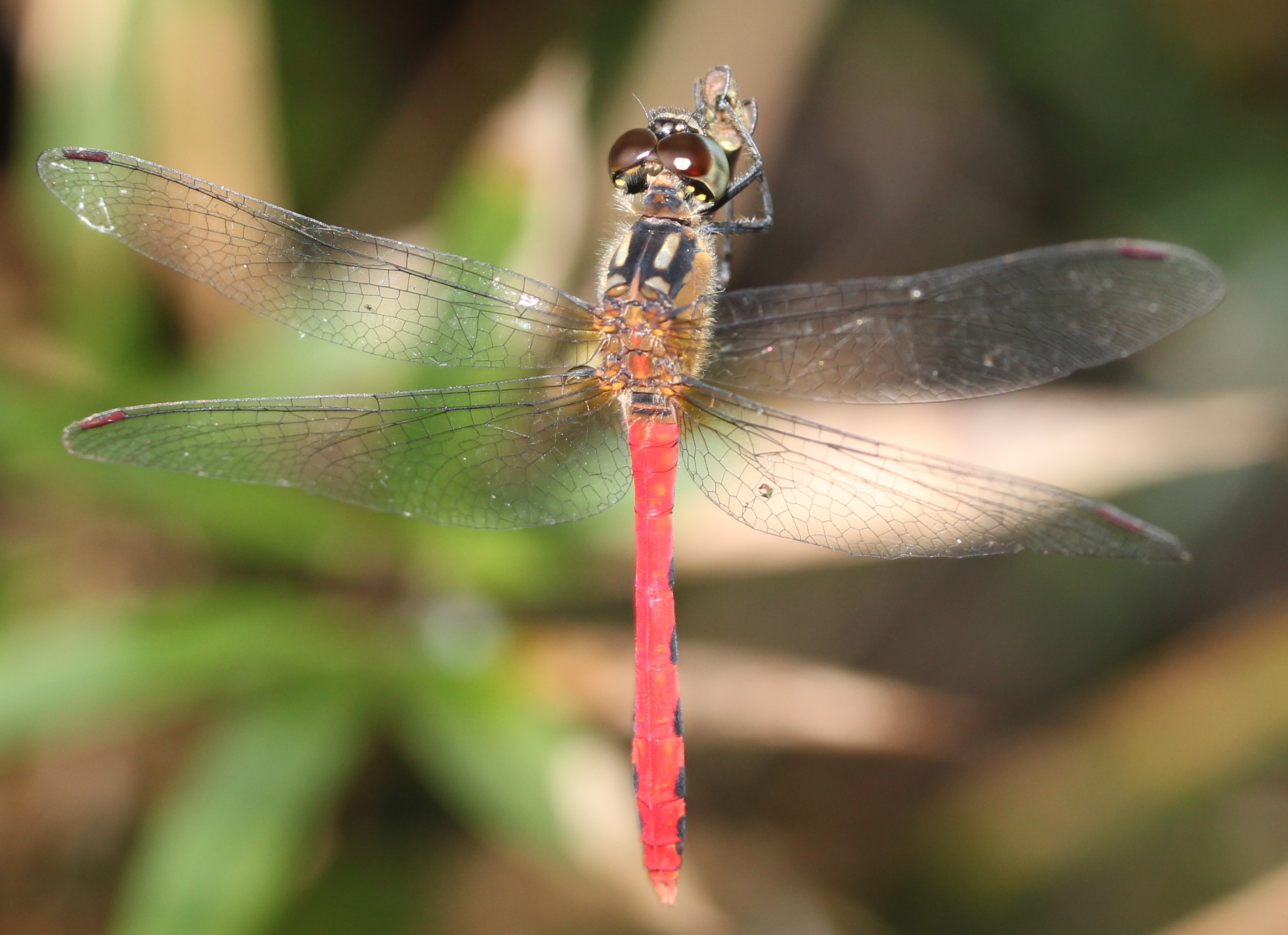
- Male

Conservation status
- Least Concern (IUCN 3.1)

Scientific classification
- Kingdom: Animalia
- Phylum: Arthropoda
- Class: Insecta
- Order: Odonata
- Infraorder: Anisoptera
- Family: Libellulidae
- Genus: Sympetrum
- Species: S. parvulum

Binomial name
- Sympetrum parvulum (Bartenev, 1912)

Synonyms
- Sympetrum eroticoides Oguma, 1922; Sympetrum fuscousus Kobayashi, 1941; Sympetrum parvum Tada, 1942; Sympetrum ruptum Needham,1930; Thecodiplax parvula Bartenev, 1912

= Sympetrum parvulum =

Species of dragonfly

Sympetrum parvulum is a species of libellulid dragonfly. They range from 2.2 to 2.6 cm long.

== Habitat ==
S. parvulum is found in China, the Russian Far East, Japan, Korea, and the Matsu Islands in Taiwan. The dragonflies are inhabitants of vegetation-rich marshes and adjacent forest fringes, as well as shaded areas of paddy fields.

== Behaviour ==
Males are territorial. In some dragonflies, the male escorts the female while she deposits her eggs by holding on to her head with his abdominal legs. This is called the tandem behaviour. The other kind of protective behaviour practised by some dragonfly males is simply called guarding, wherein the male stays close to, but not actually touching, the female, and acts in an aggressive manner to other males, similar to the way he protects his territory. Which of these escort behaviours the males adopt usually varies my species, but in Sympetrum parvulum, both protective behaviours are reported. A 1979 paper published in Researches on Population Ecology studied S. parvulum's escort behaviour in detail.

== Conservation ==
Sympetrum parvulum was assessed as "Least Concern" on the IUCN red list in 2007.
