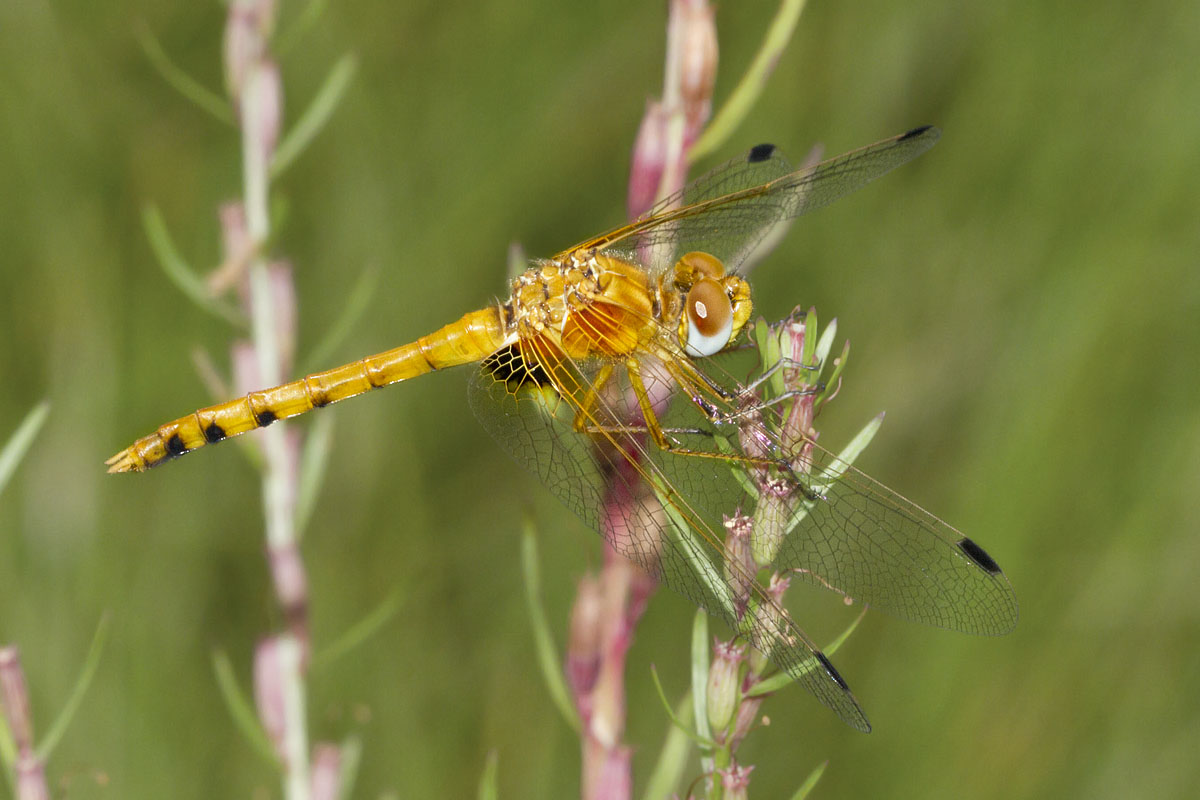

Conservation status
- Least Concern (IUCN 3.1)

Scientific classification
- Kingdom: Animalia
- Phylum: Arthropoda
- Class: Insecta
- Order: Odonata
- Infraorder: Anisoptera
- Family: Libellulidae
- Genus: Sympetrum
- Species: S. signiferum

Binomial name
- Sympetrum signiferum Cannings & Garrison, 1991

= Sympetrum signiferum =

Species of dragonfly

Sympetrum signiferum, known generally as the spot-winged meadowhawk or balsam, is a species of skimmer in the dragonfly family Libellulidae. It is found in Central America and North America.

The IUCN conservation status of Sympetrum signiferum is "LC", least concern, with no immediate threat to the species' survival. The population is stable. The IUCN status was reviewed in 2017.

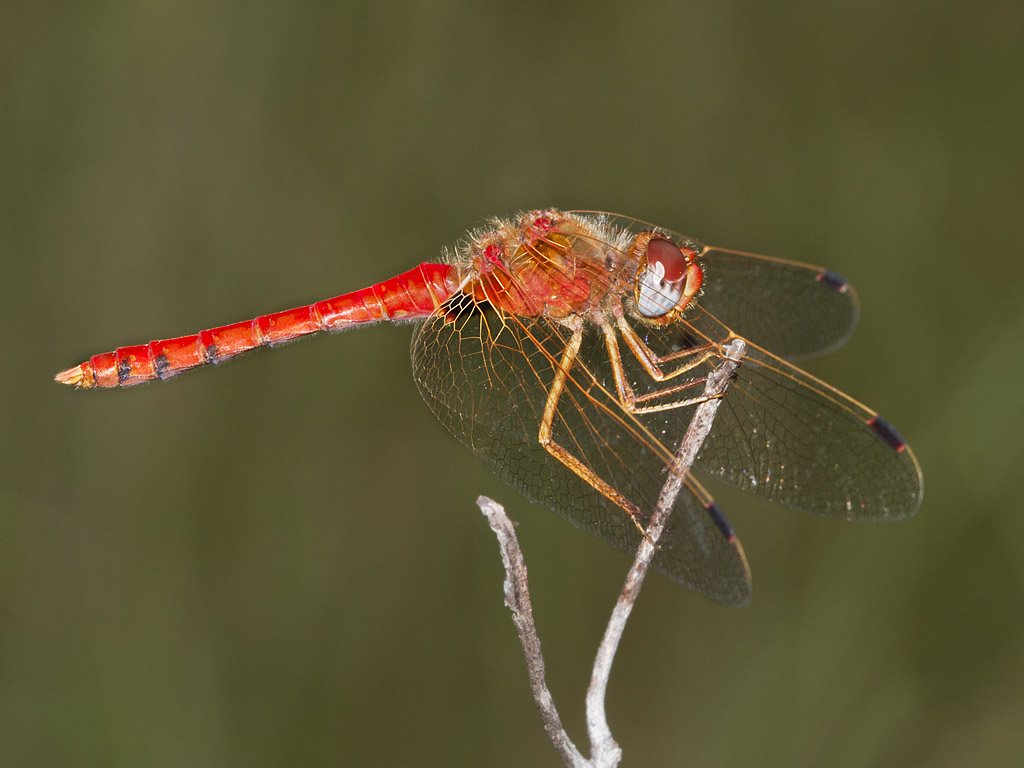
Spot-winged meadowhawk, Sympetrum signiferum

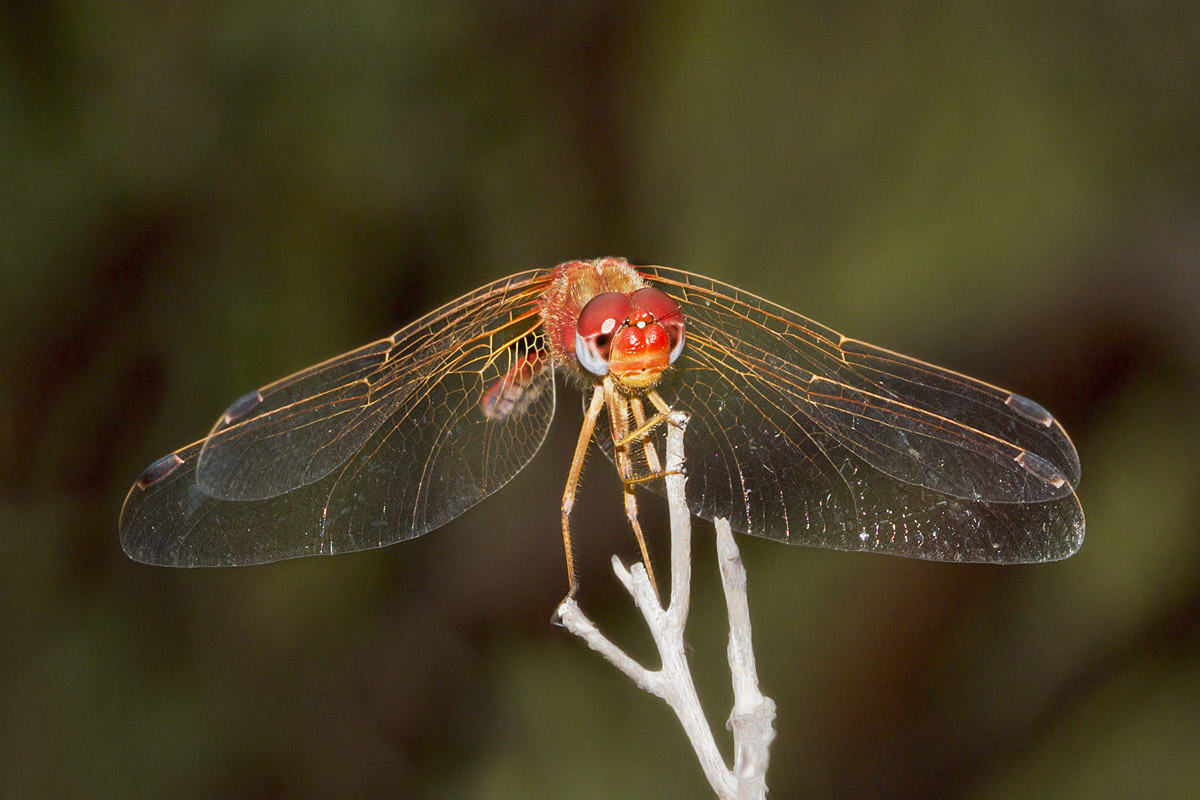
Spot-winged meadowhawk, Sympetrum signiferum
