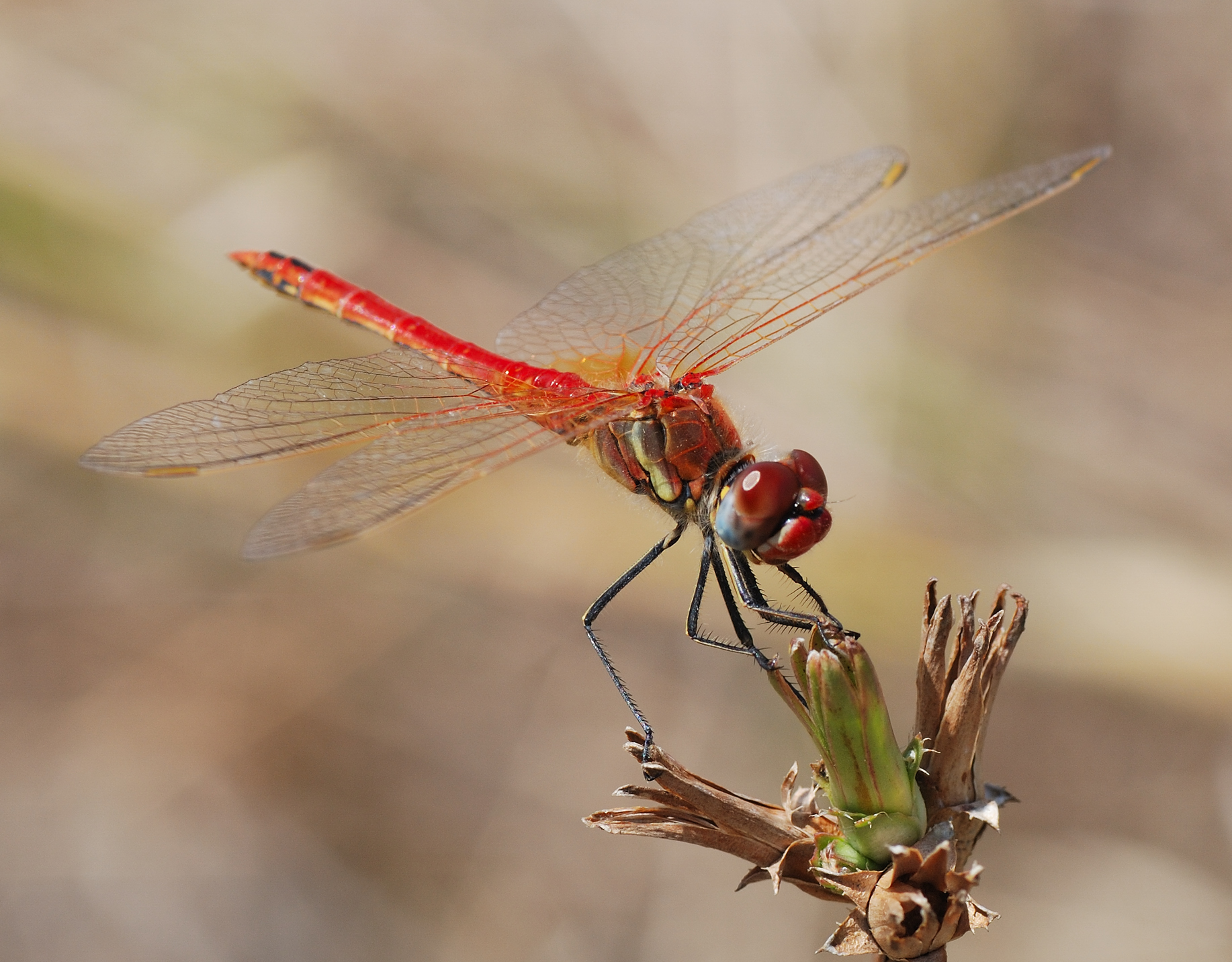
- Sympetrum fonscolombii
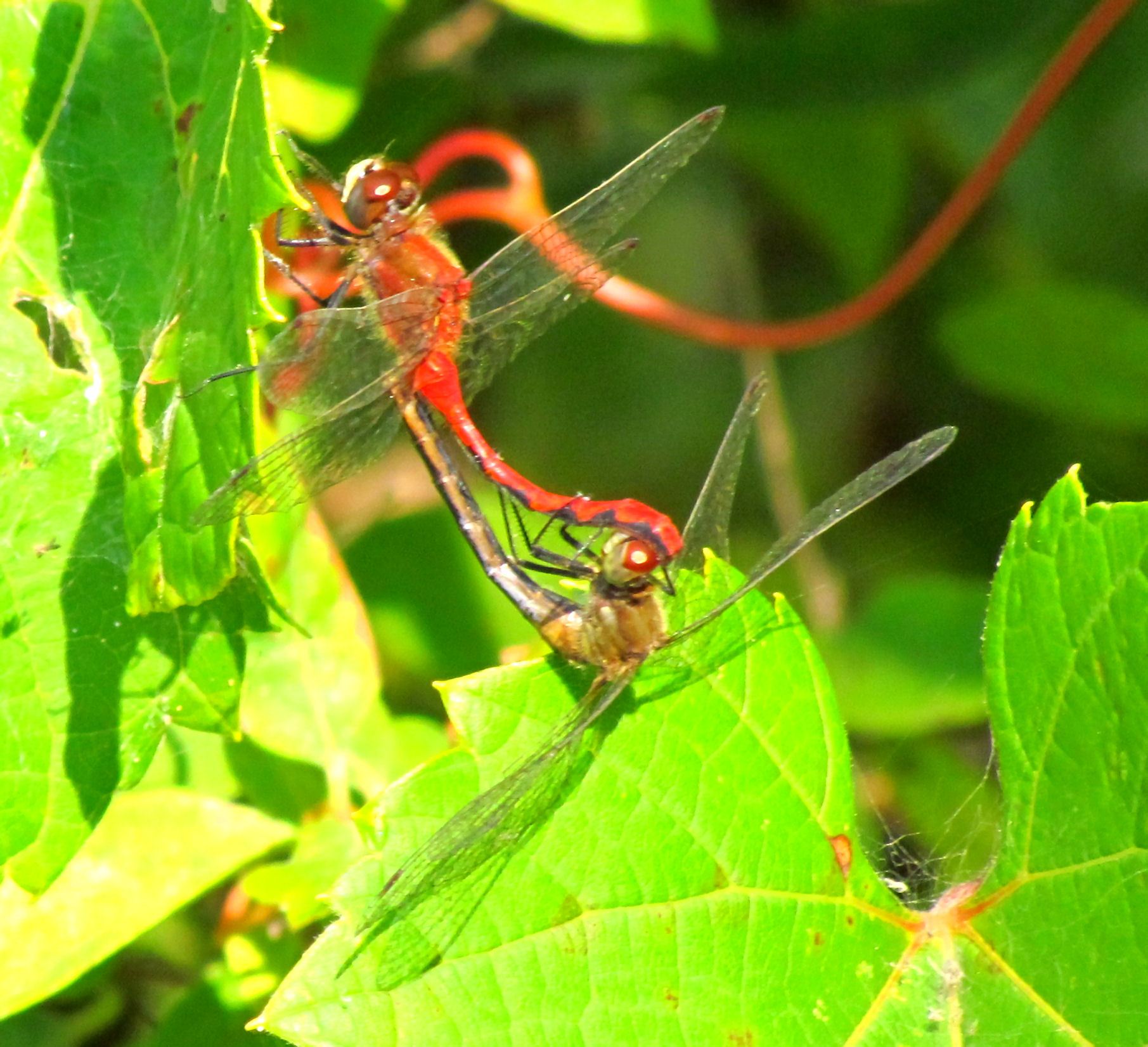
- White-faced Meadowhawks (Sympetrum obtrusum) in "wheel position", Shirleys Bay, Ottawa

Scientific classification
- Kingdom: Animalia
- Phylum: Arthropoda
- Class: Insecta
- Order: Odonata
- Infraorder: Anisoptera
- Family: Libellulidae
- Subfamily: Sympetrinae
- Genus: Sympetrum; Newman, 1833

= Sympetrum =

Darters or Meadowhawks

Genus of dragonflies

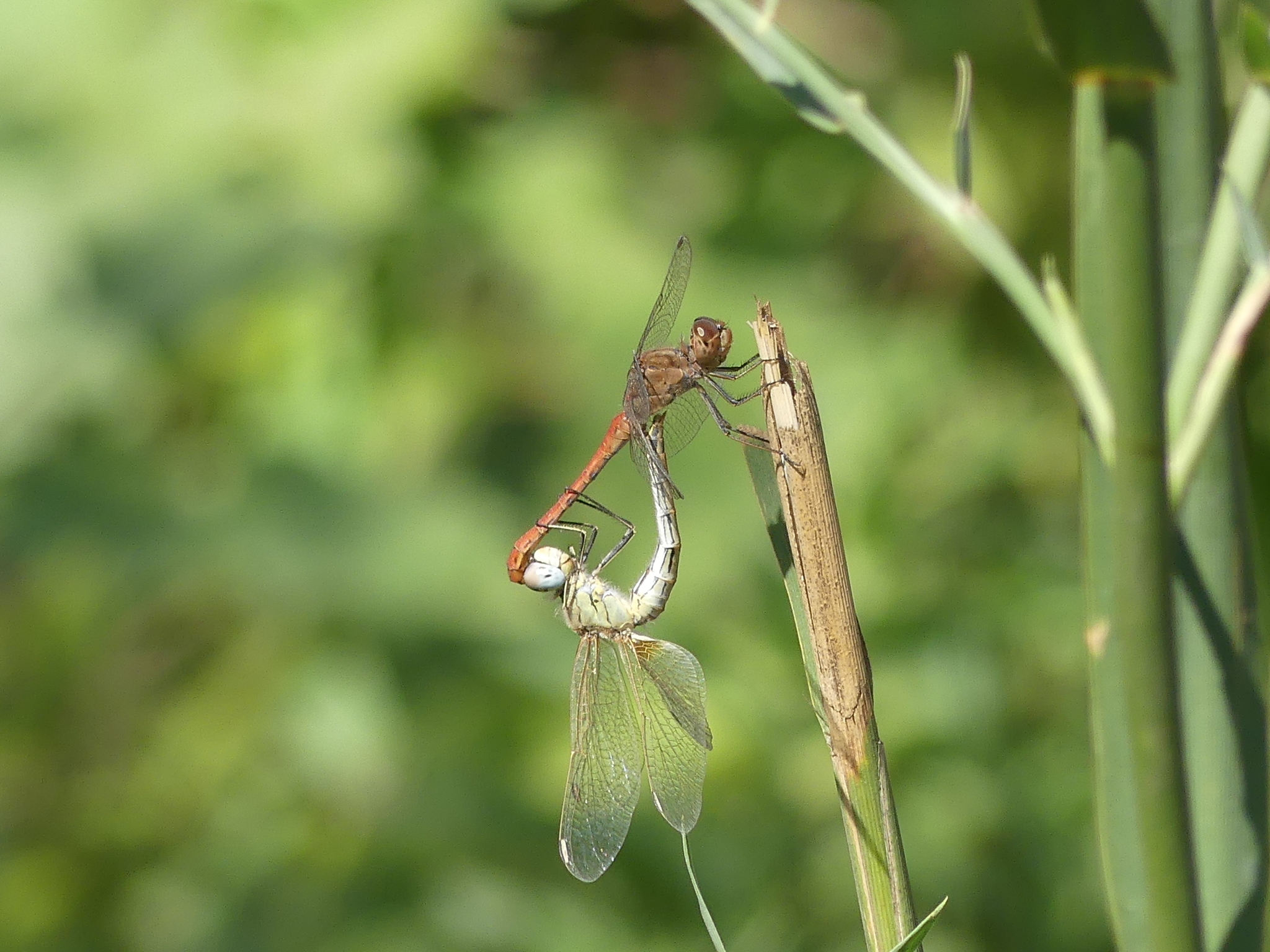
Hybrid mating between male S. meridionale (top) and female S. fonscolombii (bottom)

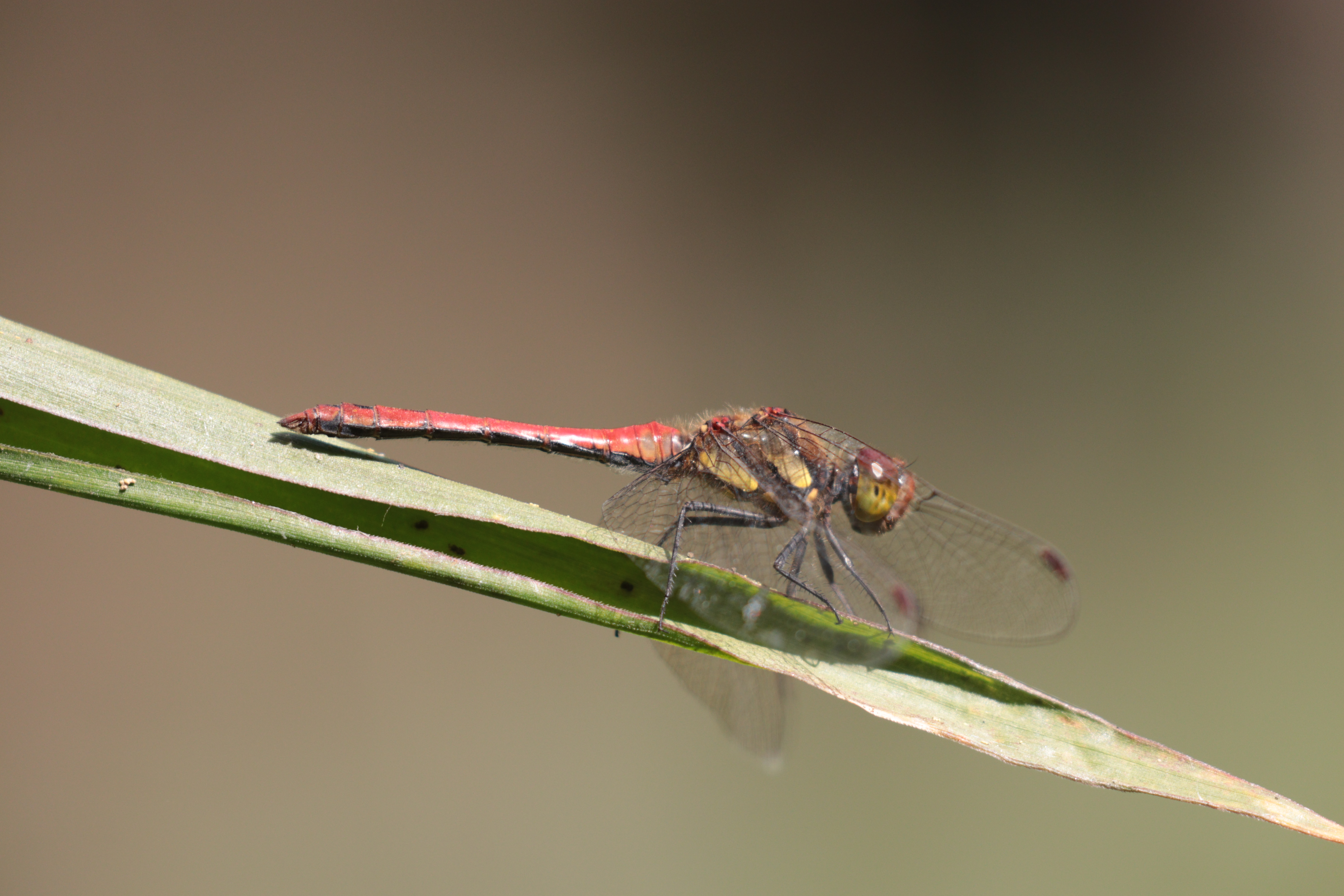
Sympetrum commixtum, Nepal

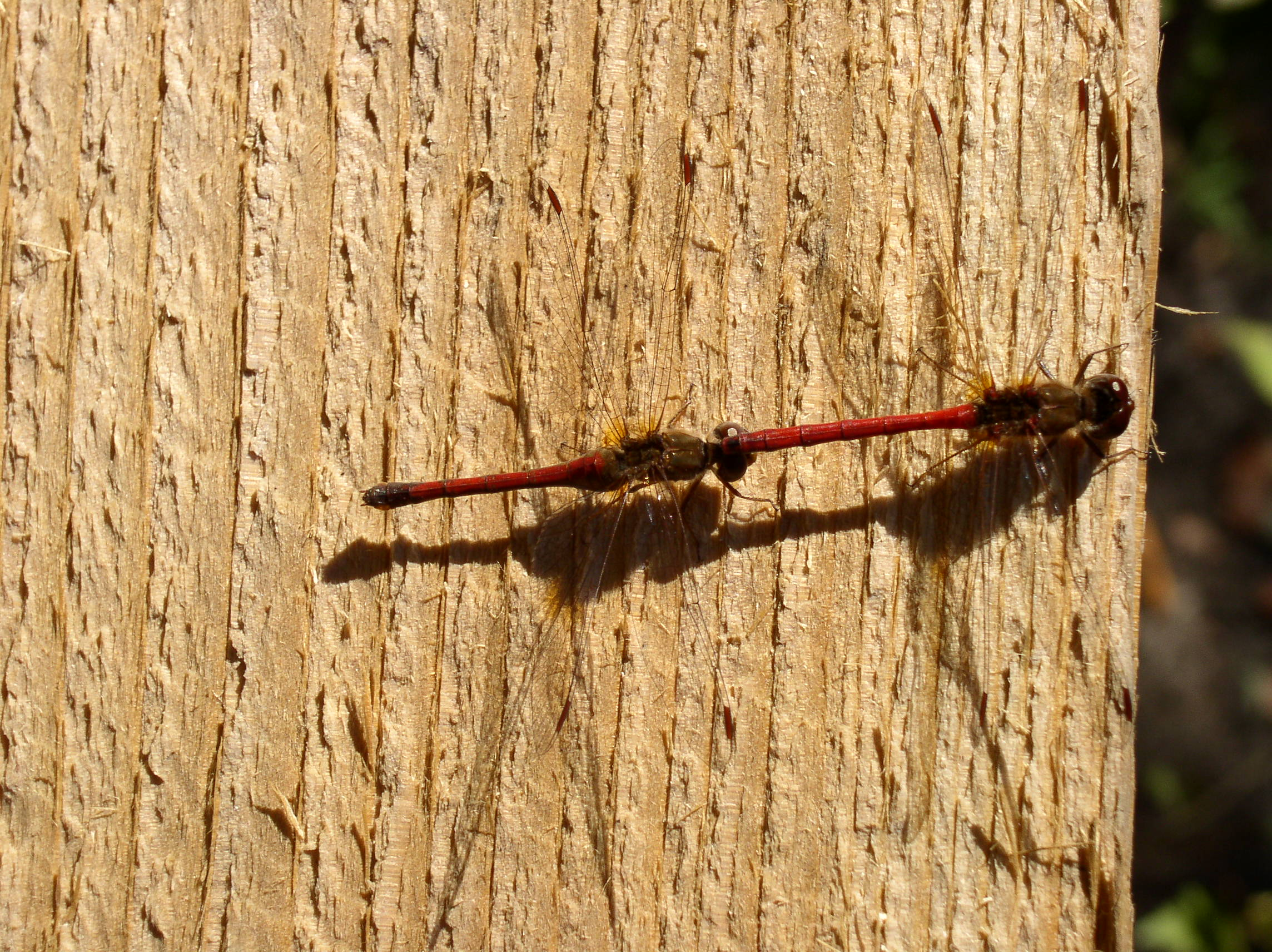
Sympetrum vicinum mating

Sympetrum is a genus of small to medium-sized skimmer dragonflies, known as darters in Europe and as meadowhawks in North America. The more than 50 species predominantly live in the temperate zone of the Northern Hemisphere; 11 species are native to Europe and 15 species native to North America, and most of the rest in Asia. A few species also occur in tropical and southern Africa (S. fonscolombii) and in South America (S. evanescens, S. gilvum, S. roraimae, S. villosum), but none is native to Australasia.

Most species fly in late summer and autumn, breeding in ponds and foraging over meadows. Commonly, they are yellow-gold as juveniles, with mature males and some females becoming bright red or orange-red on part or all of their bodies. An exception to this scheme is the Holarctic black darter or black meadowhawk (Sympetrum danae), which has black males with no red.

The genus includes the following species:

- Sympetrum ambiguum (Rambur, 1842) – blue-faced meadowhawk
- Sympetrum anomalum Needham, 1930
- Sympetrum arenicolor Jödicke, 1994
- Sympetrum baccha (Selys, 1884)
- Sympetrum chaconi De Marmels, 1994
- Sympetrum commixtum (Selys, 1884)
- Sympetrum cordulegaster (Selys, 1883)
- Sympetrum corruptum (Hagen, 1861) – variegated meadowhawk
- Sympetrum costiferum (Hagen, 1861) – saffron-winged meadowhawk
- Sympetrum croceolum (Selys, 1883)
- Sympetrum daliensis Zhu, 1999
- Sympetrum danae (Sulzer, 1776) – black darter, black meadowhawk
- Sympetrum darwinianum Selys, 1883
- Sympetrum depressiusculum (Selys, 1841) – spotted darter
- Sympetrum dilatatum (Calvert, 1892) – St. Helena darter
- Sympetrum durum Bartenev, 1916
- Sympetrum eroticum (Selys, 1883)
- Sympetrum evanescens De Marmels, 1992
- Sympetrum flaveolum (Linnaeus, 1758) – yellow-winged darter
- Sympetrum fonscolombii (Selys, 1840) – red-veined darter, nomad
- Sympetrum frequens (Selys, 1883)
- Sympetrum gilvum (Selys, 1884)
- Sympetrum gracile Oguma, 1915
- Sympetrum haematoneura Fraser, 1924
- Sympetrum haritonovi Borisov, 1983 – dwarf darter
- Sympetrum himalayanum Navás, 1934
- Sympetrum hypomelas (Selys, 1884)
- Sympetrum illotum (Hagen, 1861) – cardinal meadowhawk
- Sympetrum imitans (Selys, 1886)
- Sympetrum infuscatum (Selys, 1883)
- Sympetrum internum Montgomery, 1943 – cherry-faced meadowhawk
- Sympetrum kunckeli (Selys, 1884)
- Sympetrum maculatum Oguma, 1922
- Sympetrum madidum (Hagen, 1861) – red-veined meadowhawk
- Sympetrum meridionale (Selys, 1841) – southern darter
- Sympetrum nigrifemur (Selys, 1884) – island darter
- Sympetrum nigrocreatum Calvert, 1920 – Talamanca meadowhawk
- Sympetrum nomurai Asahina, 1997
- Sympetrum obtrusum (Hagen, 1861) – white-faced meadowhawk
- Sympetrum orientale (Selys, 1883)
- Sympetrum pallipes (Hagen, 1874) – striped meadowhawk
- Sympetrum paramo De Marmels, 2001
- Sympetrum parvulum (Bartenev, 1912)
- Sympetrum pedemontanum (Müller, 1766) – banded darter
- Sympetrum risi Bartenev, 1914
- Sympetrum roraimae De Marmels, 1988
- Sympetrum rubicundulum (Say, 1840) – ruby meadowhawk
- Sympetrum ruptum Needham, 1930
- Sympetrum sanguineum (Müller, 1764) – ruddy darter
- Sympetrum semicinctum (Say, 1840) – band-winged meadowhawk
- Sympetrum signiferum Cannings & Garrison, 1991
- Sympetrum sinaiticum Dumont, 1977 – desert darter
- Sympetrum speciosum Oguma, 1915
- Sympetrum striolatum (Charpentier, 1840) – common darter
- Sympetrum tibiale (Ris, 1897)
- Sympetrum uniforme (Selys, 1883)
- Sympetrum verum Bartenev, 1916
- Sympetrum vicinum (Hagen, 1861) – yellow-legged meadowhawk, autumn meadowhawk
- Sympetrum villosum Ris, 1911
- Sympetrum vulgatum (Linnaeus, 1758) – vagrant darter, moustached darter
- Sympetrum xiaoi Han & Zhu, 1997
