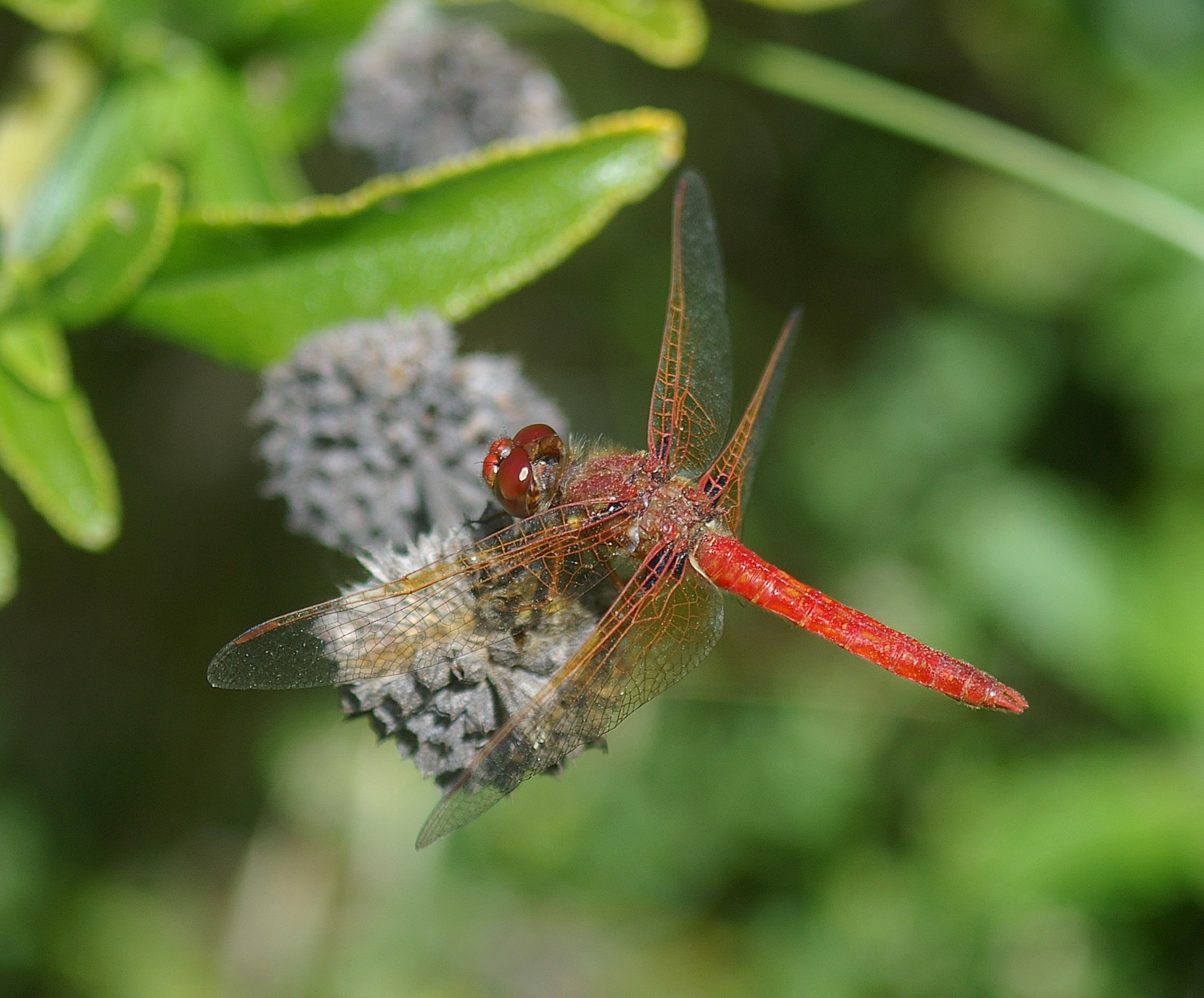

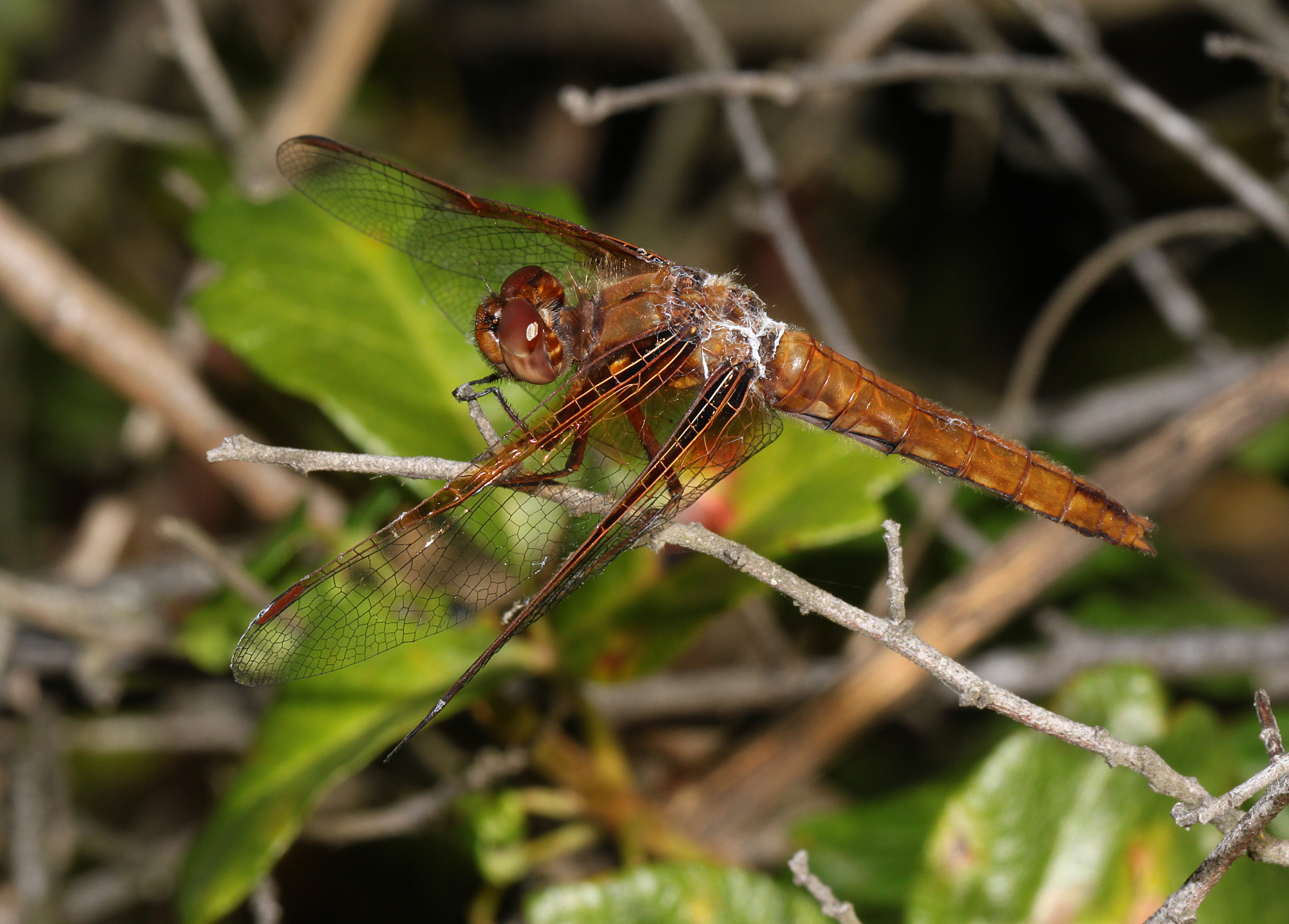
- Male (top) and female (bottom)

Conservation status
- Least Concern (IUCN 3.1)

Scientific classification
- Kingdom: Animalia
- Phylum: Arthropoda
- Class: Insecta
- Order: Odonata
- Infraorder: Anisoptera
- Family: Libellulidae
- Genus: Sympetrum
- Species: S. illotum

Binomial name
- Sympetrum illotum (Hagen, 1861)

= Sympetrum illotum =

Species of dragonfly

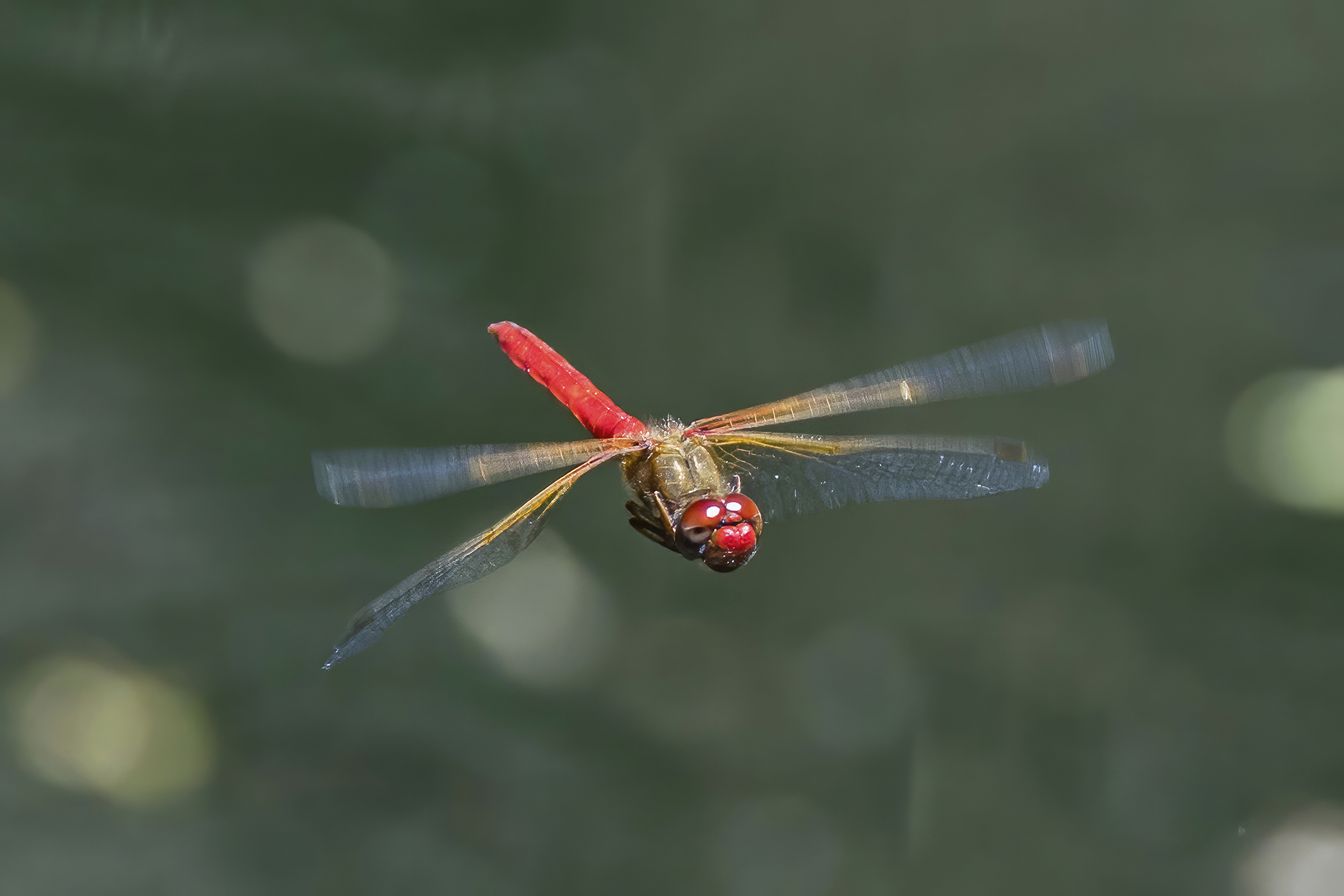
male in flight

Sympetrum illotum, the cardinal meadowhawk, is a species of skimmer in the dragonfly family Libellulidae. It is found in North America and South America, including islands in the Caribbean.

The IUCN conservation status of Sympetrum illotum is least concern, with no immediate threat to the species' survival. The population is stable.

== Subspecies ==
These three subspecies belong to the species Sympetrum illotum:

- Sympetrum illotum gilvum Brauer, 1868
- Sympetrum illotum illotum (Hagen, 1861)
- Sympetrum illotum virgulum (Selys, 1884)
