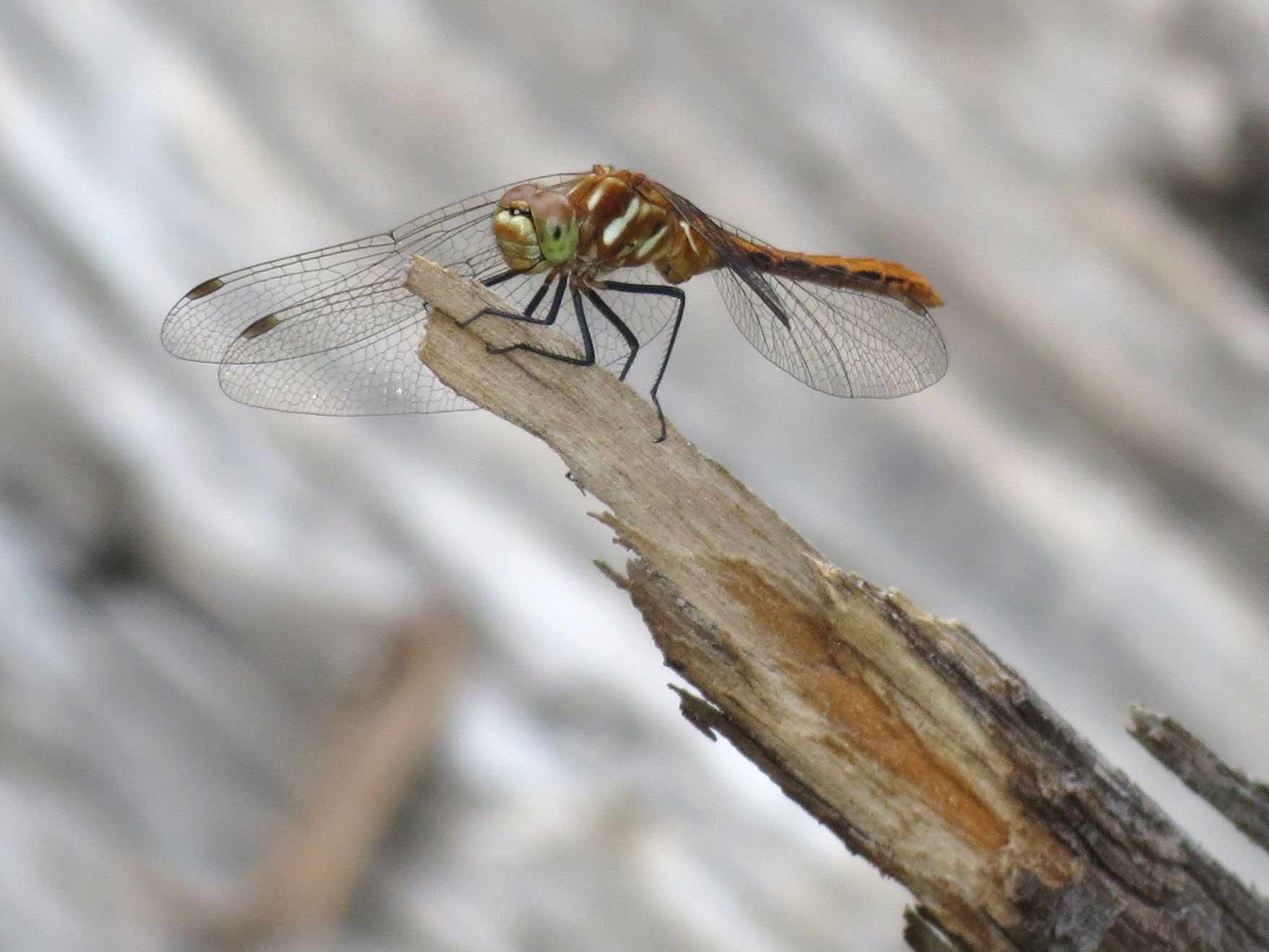

Conservation status
- Least Concern (IUCN 3.1)

Scientific classification
- Kingdom: Animalia
- Phylum: Arthropoda
- Class: Insecta
- Order: Odonata
- Infraorder: Anisoptera
- Family: Libellulidae
- Genus: Sympetrum
- Species: S. pallipes

Binomial name
- Sympetrum pallipes (Hagen, 1874)

= Sympetrum pallipes =

Species of dragonfly

Sympetrum pallipes, the striped meadowhawk, is a species of skimmer in the dragonfly family Libellulidae. It is found in North America.

The IUCN conservation status of Sympetrum pallipes is "LC", least concern, with no immediate threat to the species' survival. The population is stable. The IUCN status was reviewed in 2017.
