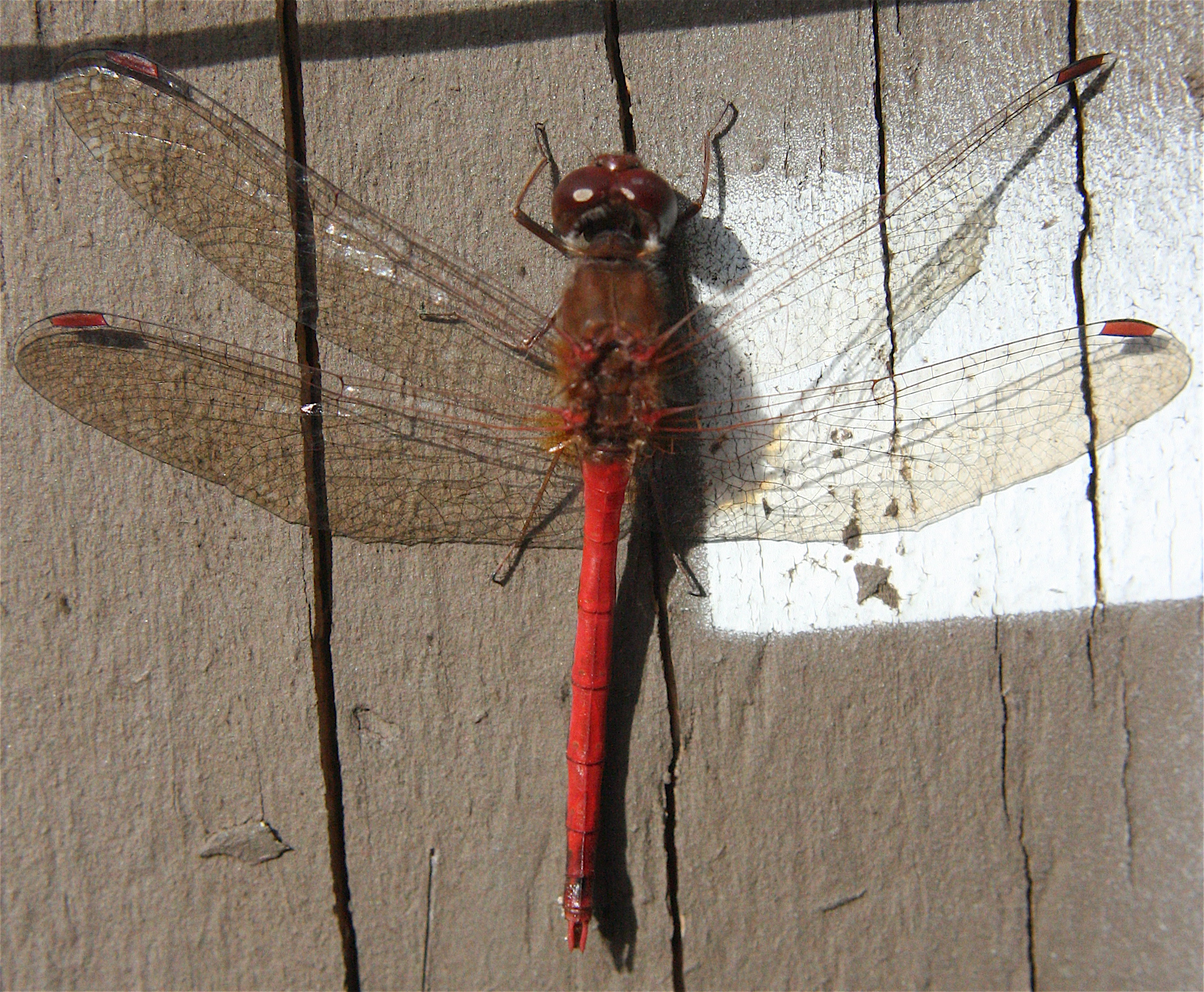
- Male
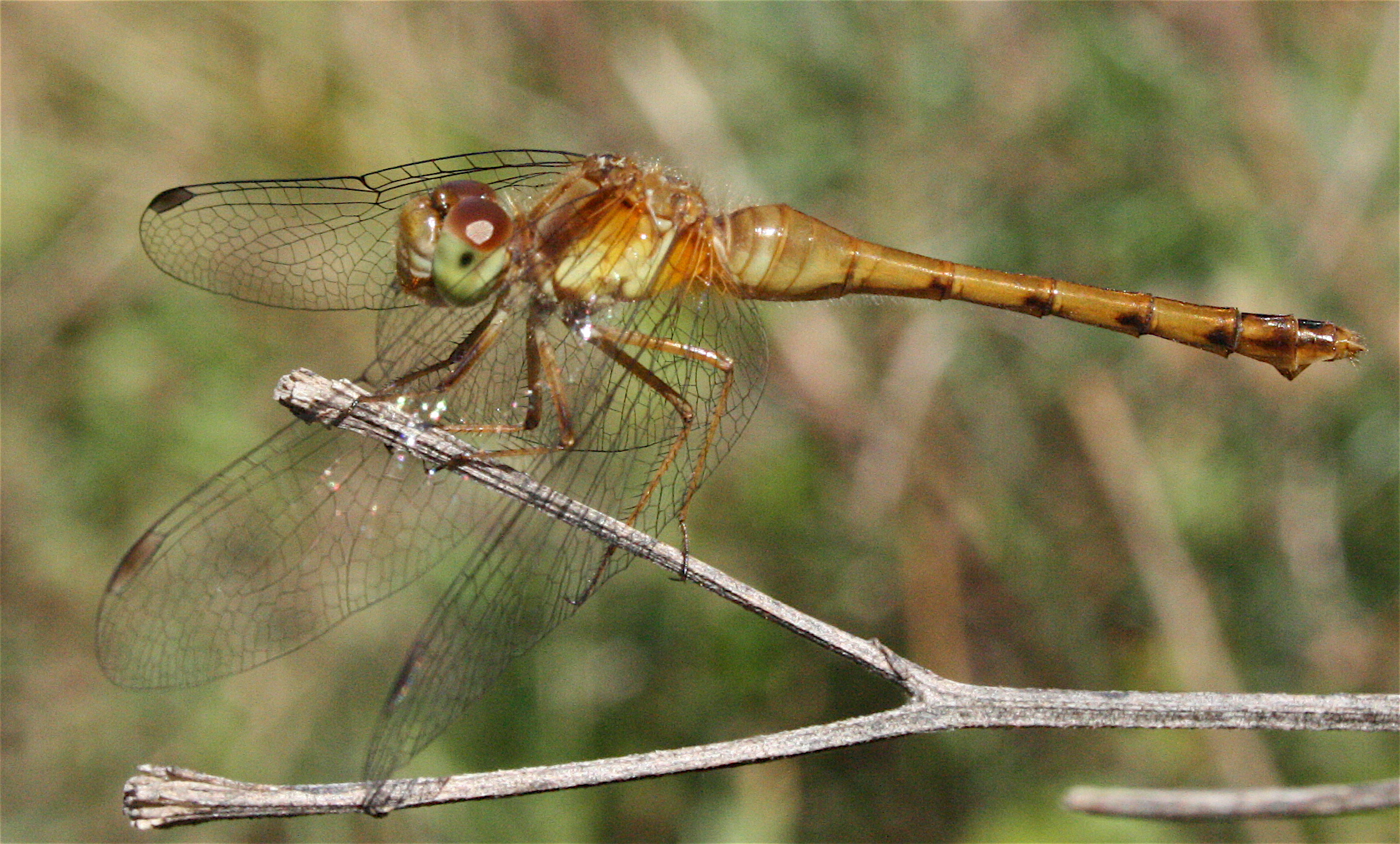
- Female

Conservation status
- Least Concern (IUCN 3.1)

Scientific classification
- Kingdom: Animalia
- Phylum: Arthropoda
- Class: Insecta
- Order: Odonata
- Infraorder: Anisoptera
- Family: Libellulidae
- Genus: Sympetrum
- Species: S. vicinum

Binomial name
- Sympetrum vicinum (Hagen, 1861)

= Sympetrum vicinum =

Species of dragonfly

Sympetrum vicinum, the Yellow-Legged Meadowhawk, is one of some fifteen North American species of autumn meadowhawk, which are dragonflies in the Libellulidae family. It grows to 26–35 mm long.

== Description ==
=== Naiad ===
This species has a small naiad, with a length of 12 to 15 mm (0.47 to 0.59 in). It is mottled green and brown in color. The abdomen has several large hooks along the top, and the last two abdominal segments have a single, large, rear-facing spine on each side. This species has bigger eyes than other members of the genus.

=== Adult ===
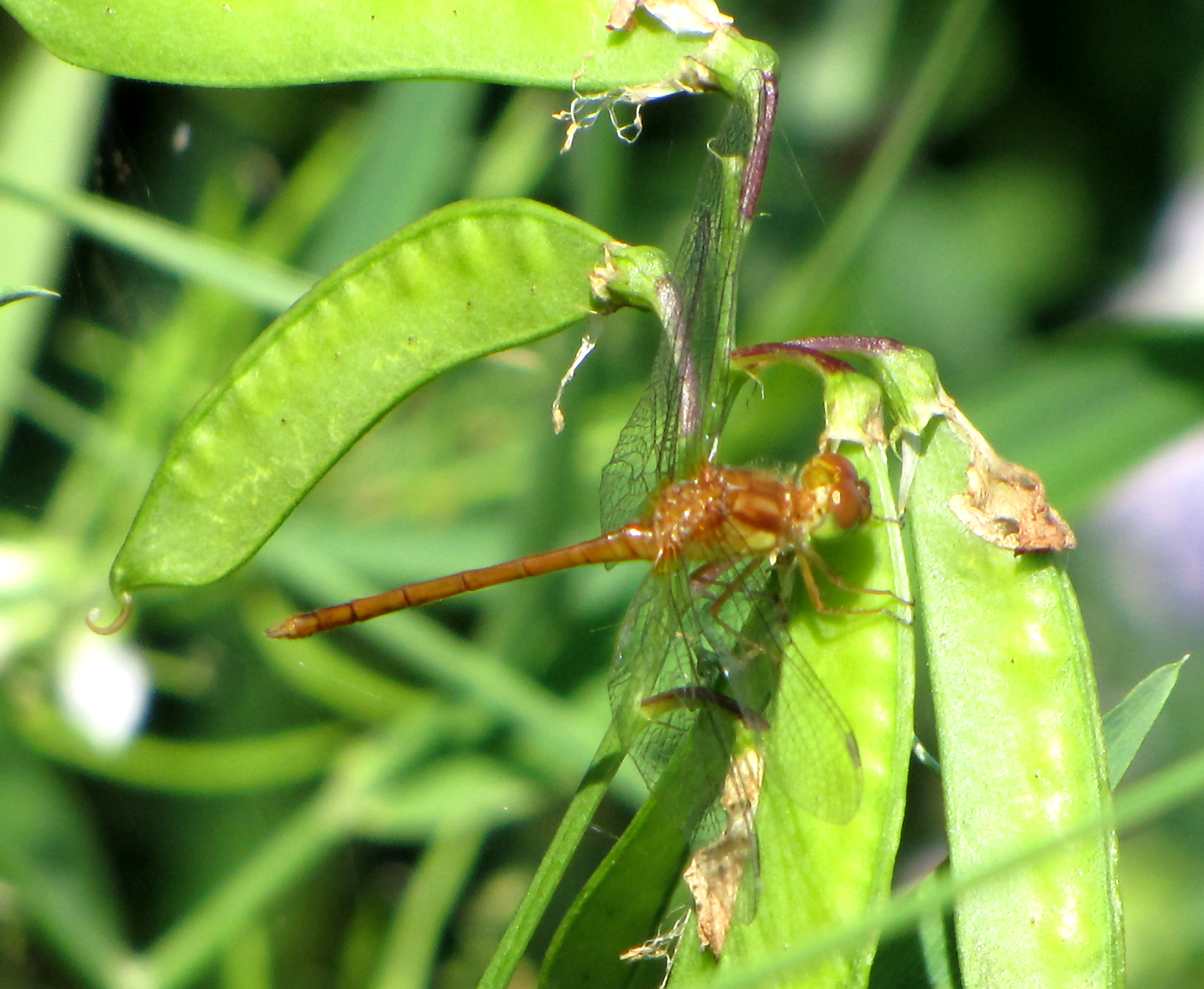
Juvenile male, Ottawa, Ontario

This is a small dragonfly, with a length of 30 to 35 mm (1.2 to 1.4 in). The wings are mostly clear but have a small patch of yellowish to orange clouding at the base of each hindwing. Mature males are brownish black on the face and thorax and have a red abdomen, while immature males have a yellow thorax and a yellowish brown abdomen. Females have a brown thorax and a brownish-red abdomen. As its common name implies, the legs of the adults are yellow.

== Range and habitat ==
This dragonfly is found in and around marshes, ponds and slow-moving streams throughout the eastern United States, southern Canada, the Great Plains, and the west coast of North America. This species has two separate populations in North America. One is found from Ontario east to Nova Scotia, extending south into the U.S. to Texas and Florida. The other population occurs in British Columbia, Washington, Oregon and Idaho.

== Adult flight season ==
Late July to early November

== Diet ==
=== Naiad ===
Naiads feed on a wide variety of aquatic insects, such as mosquito larvae, other aquatic fly larvae, mayfly larvae, and freshwater shrimp. They will also eat very small fish and tadpoles.

=== Adult ===
The dragonfly will eat almost any soft-bodied flying insect including mosquitoes, flies, small moths, mayflies, and flying ants or termites.

== Ecology ==
The naiads live in the debris of the bottoms of lakes and ponds. They do not actively pursue prey but wait for it to pass by, a strategy which affords them protection from other predators. The naiads emerge from the water to make the transition to adult dragonflies at night. Adults fly from early August through October. This species flies later in the fall than any other species in the Northwest, with observations as late as October 29 in Idaho and into November in Washington. The adults of this species hunt flying insects from perches on rocks or bare branches. The Latin name for this genus, Sympetrum, means "with rock" and refers to their habit of basking on rocks to absorb heat early in the day. This dragonfly is abundant where it occurs, with large numbers of pairs flying and laying eggs in tandem.

== Reproduction ==
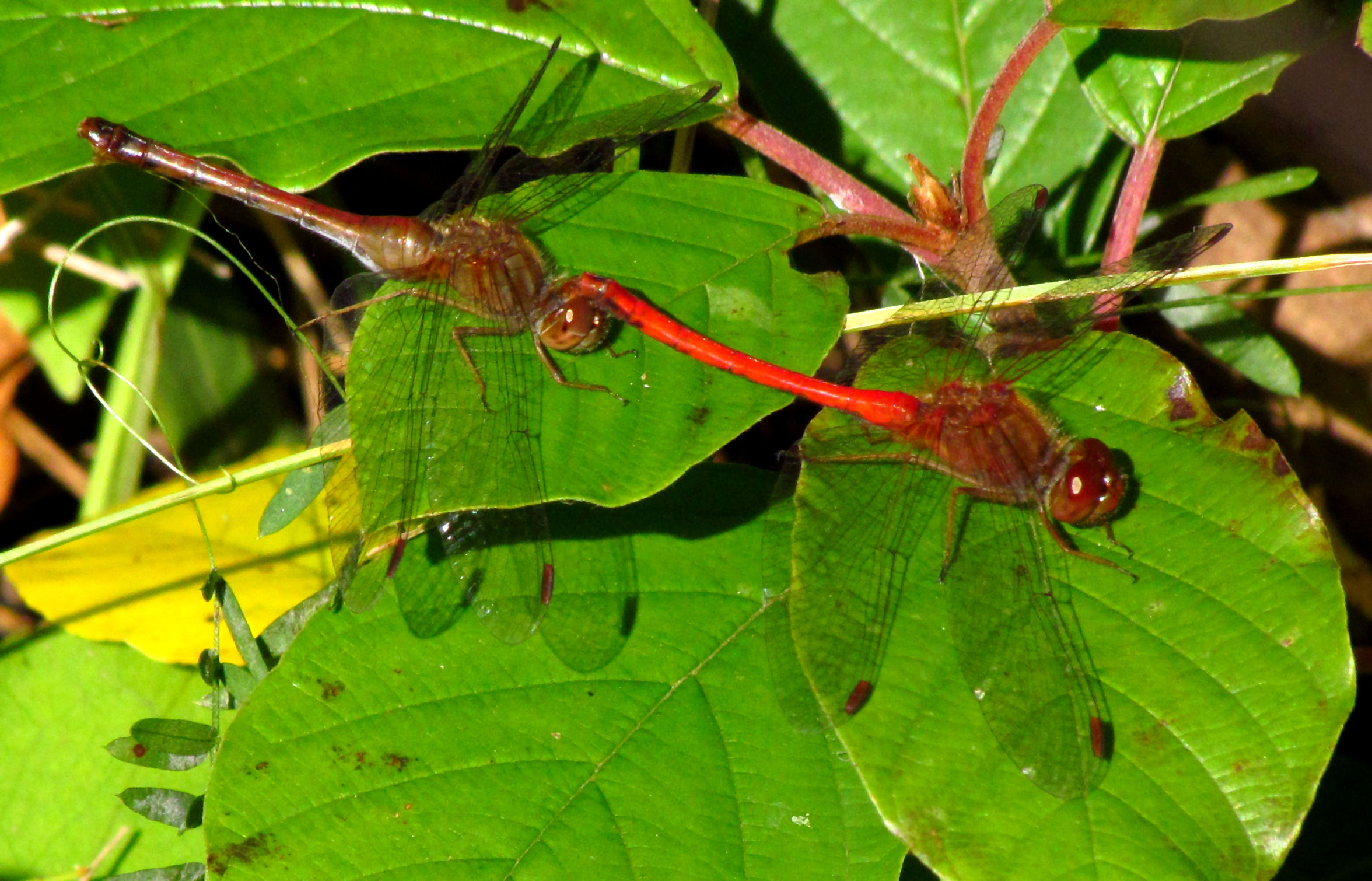
Tandem position, male in front

The female flies with the male still attached after mating (a position called "in tandem") and lays her eggs near the shoreline of lakes and ponds by dipping the tip of her abdomen on the surface of the water. Large-mouth bass (Micropterus salmoides) have been observed following mated pairs of dragonflies as they fly just above the surface, and then eating them as they touch the surface to lay eggs.

== Conservation ==
Populations are widespread, abundant, and secure.
