= List of Canadian dragonflies =

This is a list of dragonflies (Odonata) of Canada.

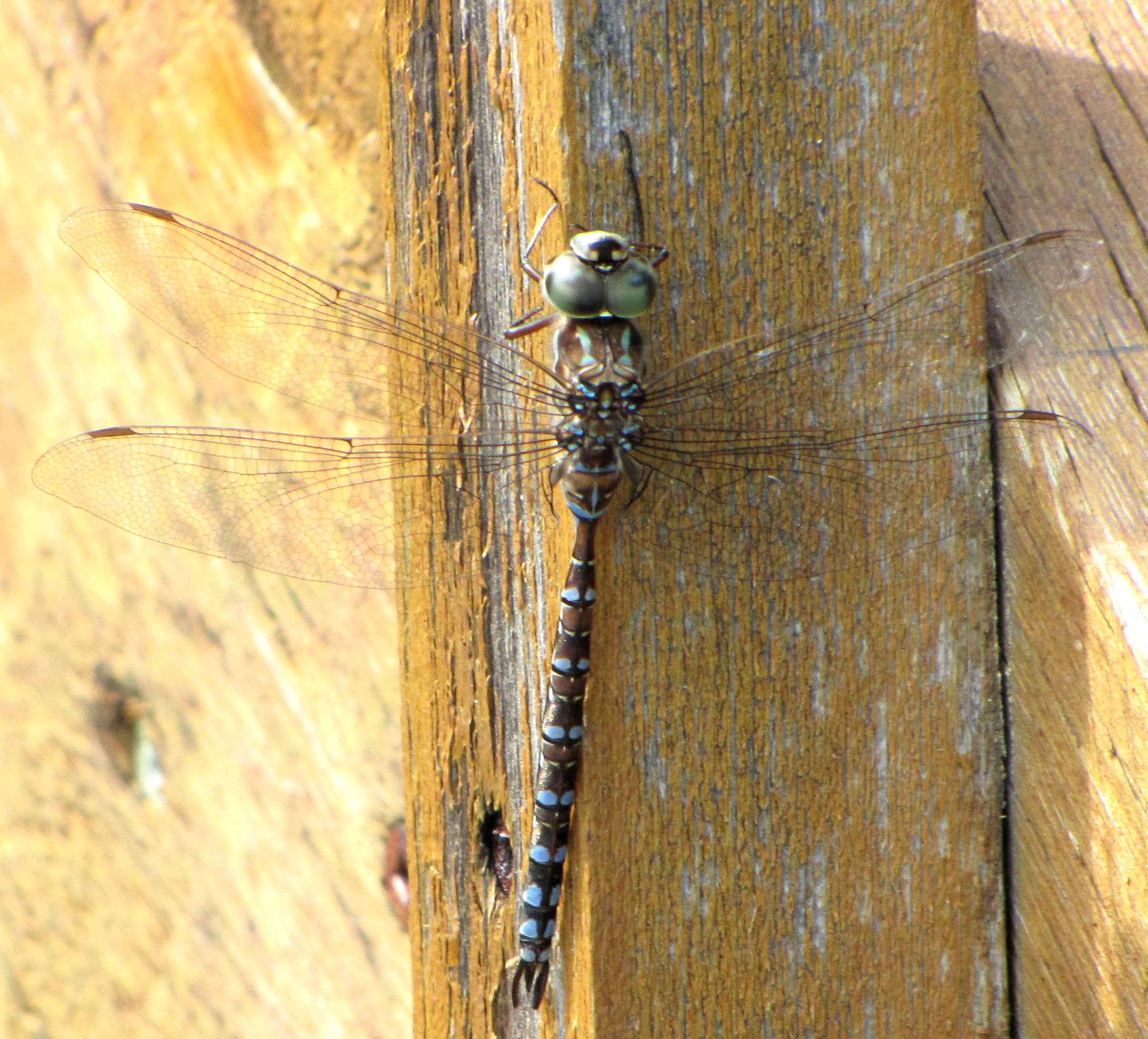
Lake darner (Aeshna eremita)

== Family Aeshnidae, darners ==
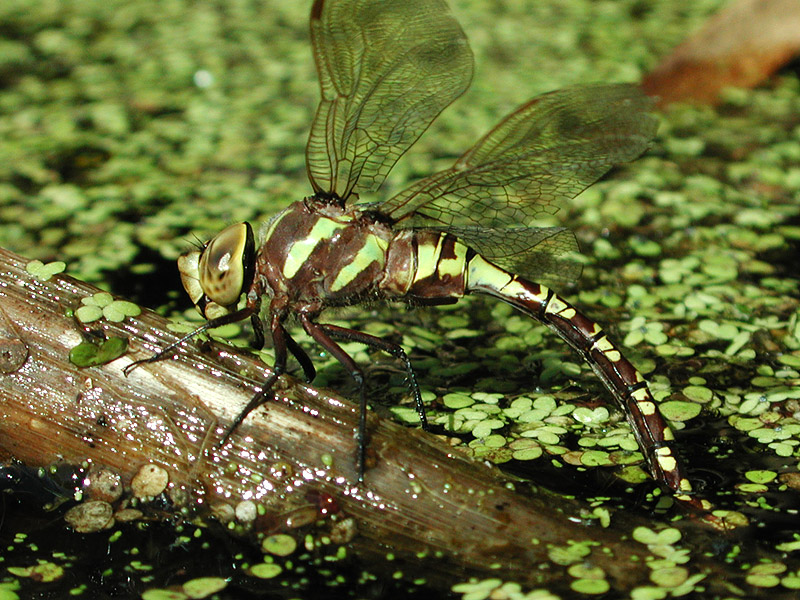
Canada darner (Aeshna canadensis)

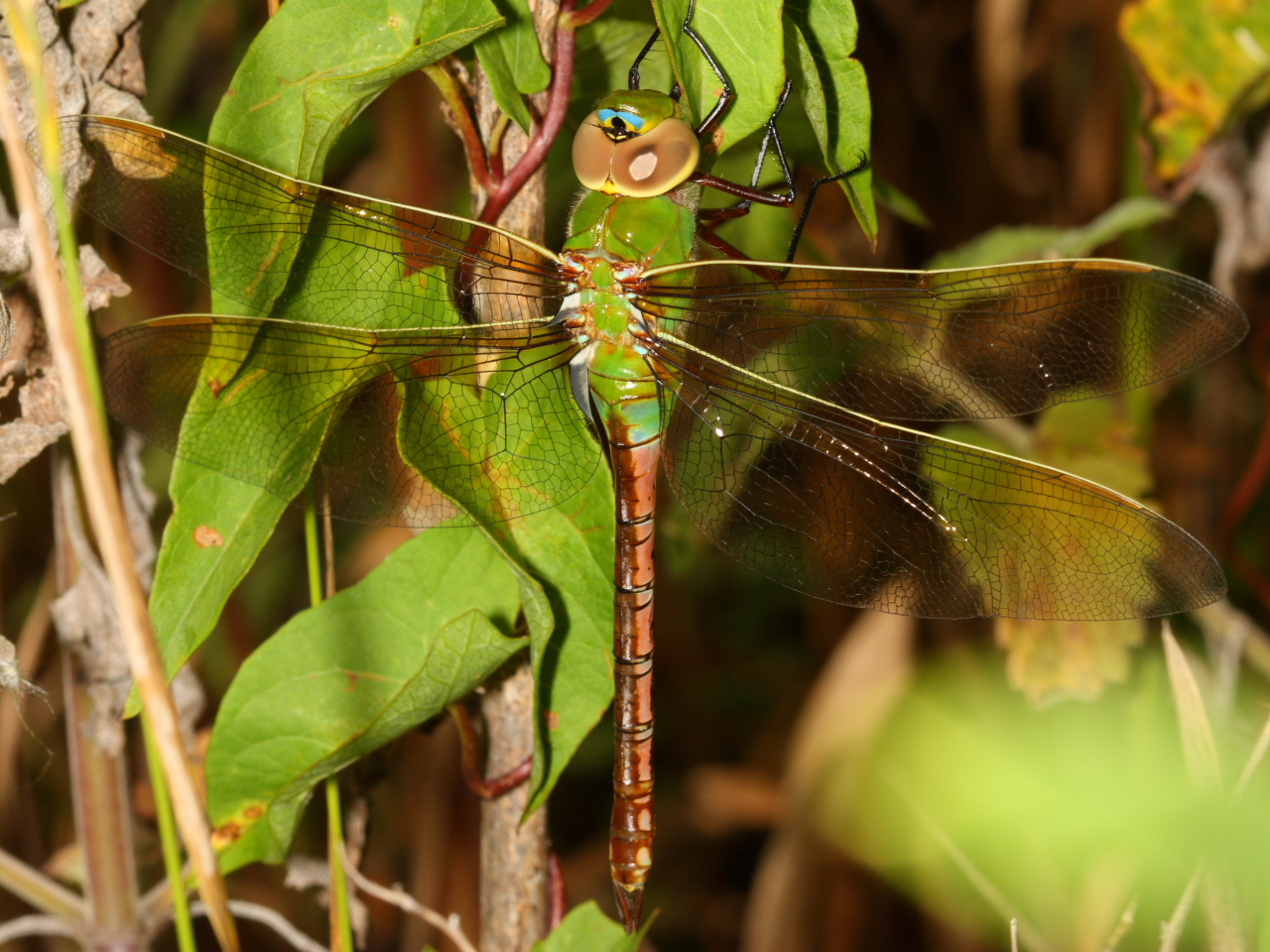
Green darner (Anax junius)

=== Genus Aeshna ===
- Aeshna canadensis, Canada darner
- Aeshna clepsydra, mottled darner
- Aeshna constricta, lance-tipped darner
- Aeshna eremita, lake darner
- Aeshna interrupta, variable darner
- Aeshna juncea, common hawker
- Aeshna mixta, migrant hawker
- Aeshna palmata, paddle-tailed darner
- Aeshna septentrionalis, azure darner
- Aeshna sitchensis, zigzag darner
- Aeshna subarctica, subarctic darner
- Aeshna tuberculifera, black-tipped darner
- Aeshna umbrosa, shadow darner
- Aeshna verticalis, green-striped darner

=== Genus Anax ===
- Anax imperator, Emperor
- Anax junius, green darner
- Anax longipes, comet darner

=== Genus Basiaeschna ===
- Basiaeschna janata, springtime darner

=== Genus Boyeria ===
- Boyeria grafiana, ocellated darner
- Boyeria vinosa, fawn darner

=== Genus Epiaeschna ===
- Epiaeschna heros, swamp darner

=== Genus Gomphaeschna ===
- Gomphaeschna furcillata, harlequin darner

=== Genus Nasiaeschna ===
- Nasiaechna pentacantha, Cyrano darner

=== Genus Rhionaeschna ===
- Rhionaeschna californica, California darner
- Rhionaeschna mutata, spatterdock darner
- Rhionaeschna multicolor, blue-eyed darner

== Family Gomphidae, clubtails ==
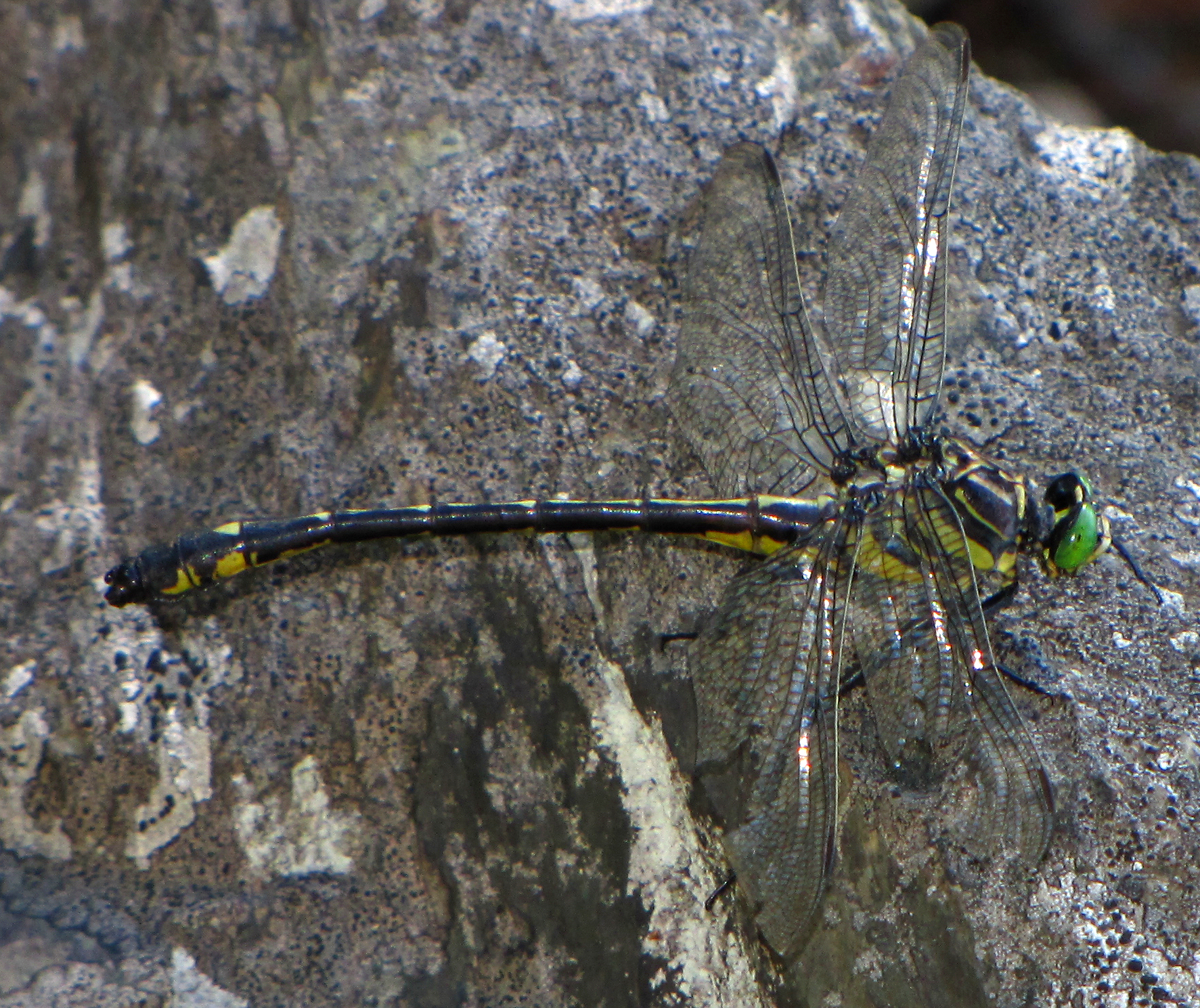
Dragonhunter (Hagenius brevistylus)

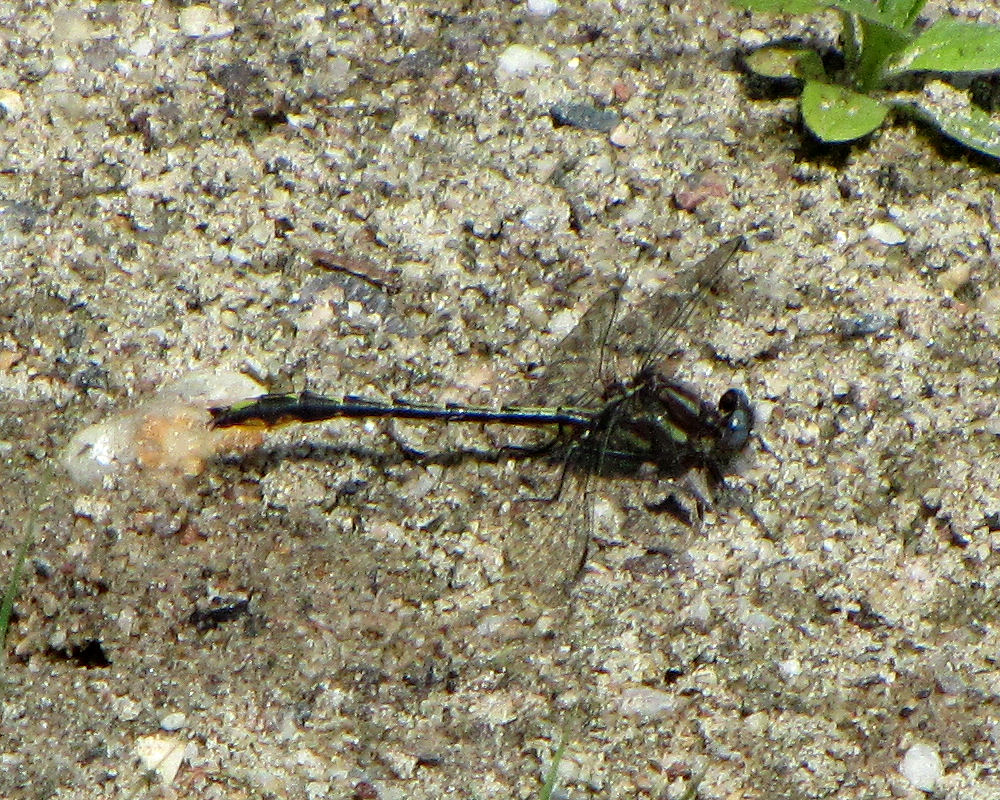
Lancet clubtail (Phanogomphus exilis)

=== Genus Hagenius ===
- Hagenius brevistylus, dragonhunter

=== Genus Hylogomphus ===
- Hylogomphus adelphus, mustached clubtail
- Hylogomphus viridifrons, green-faced clubtail

=== Genus Gomphurus ===
- Gomphurus externus, plains clubtail
- Gomphurus fraternus, midland clubtail
- Gomphurus lineatifrons, splendid clubtail
- Gomphurus vastus, cobra clubtail
- Gomphurus ventricosus, skillet clubtail

=== Genus Stylurus ===
- Stylurus amnicola, riverine clubtail
- Stylurus intricatus, brimstone clubtail
- Stylurus notatus, elusive clubtail
- Stylurus olivaceus, olive clubtail
- Stylurus scudderi, zebra clubtail
- Stylurus spiniceps, arrow clubtail

=== Genus Dromogomphus ===
- Dromogomphus spinosus, black-shouldered clubtail
- Dromogomphus spoliatus, flag-tailed clubtail

=== Genus Arigomphus ===
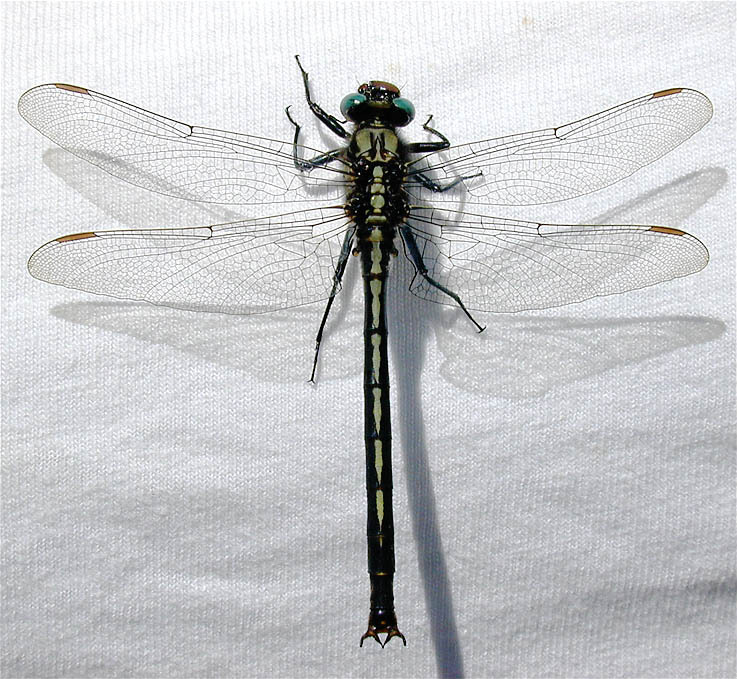
Horned clubtail (Arigomphus cornutus)

- Arigomphus cornutus, horned clubtail
- Arigomphus furcifer, lilypad clubtail
- Arigomphus villosipes, unicorn clubtail

=== Genus Phanogomphus ===
- Phanogomphus borealis, beaverpond clubtail
- Phanogomphus descriptus, harpoon clubtail
- Phanogomphus exilis, lancet clubtail
- Phanogomphus graslinellus, pronghorn clubtail
- Phanogomphus lividus, ashy clubtail
- Phanogomphus spicatus, dusky clubtail
- Phanogomphus quadricolor, rapids clubtail

=== Genus Progomphus ===
- Progomphus obscurus, common sanddragon

=== Genus Ophiogomphus ===
- Ophiogomphus anomalus, extra-striped snaketail
- Ophiogomphus aspersus, brook snaketail
- Ophiogomphus carolus, riffle snaketail
- Ophiogomphus colubrinus, boreal snaketail
- Ophiogomphus howei, pygmy snaketail
- Ophiogomphus mainensis, Maine snaketail
- Ophiogomphus occidentis, sinuous snaketail
- Ophiogomphus severus, pale snaketail
- Ophiogomphus smithi, Sioux snaketail
- Ophiogomphus rupinsulensis, rusty snaketail

=== Genus Stylogomphus ===
- Stylogomphus albistylus, least clubtail

=== Genus Lanthus ===
- Lanthus parvulus, northern pygmy clubtail

=== Genus Octogomphus ===
- Octogomphus specularis, grappletail

== Family Cordulegastridae, spiketails ==
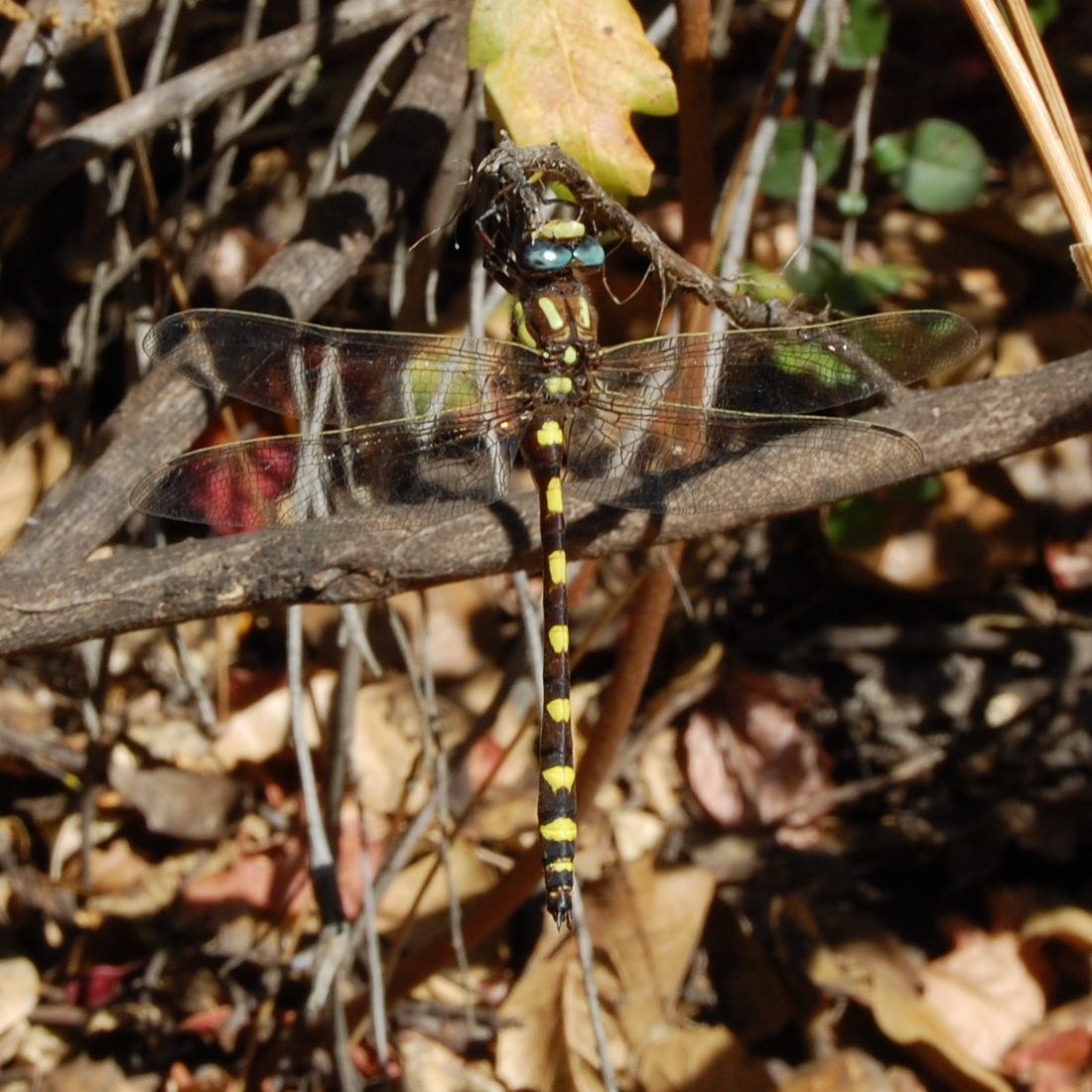
Pacific spiketail (Cordulegaster dorsalis)

=== Genus Cordulegaster ===
- Cordulegaster diastatops, delta-spotted Spiketail
- Cordulegaster dorsalis, Pacific spiketail
- Cordulegaster maculata, twin-spotted spiketail
- Cordulegaster obliqua, arrowhead spiketail

== Family Corduliidae, emeralds ==
=== Genus Cordulia ===
- Cordulia shurtleffii, American emerald

=== Genus Dorocordulia ===
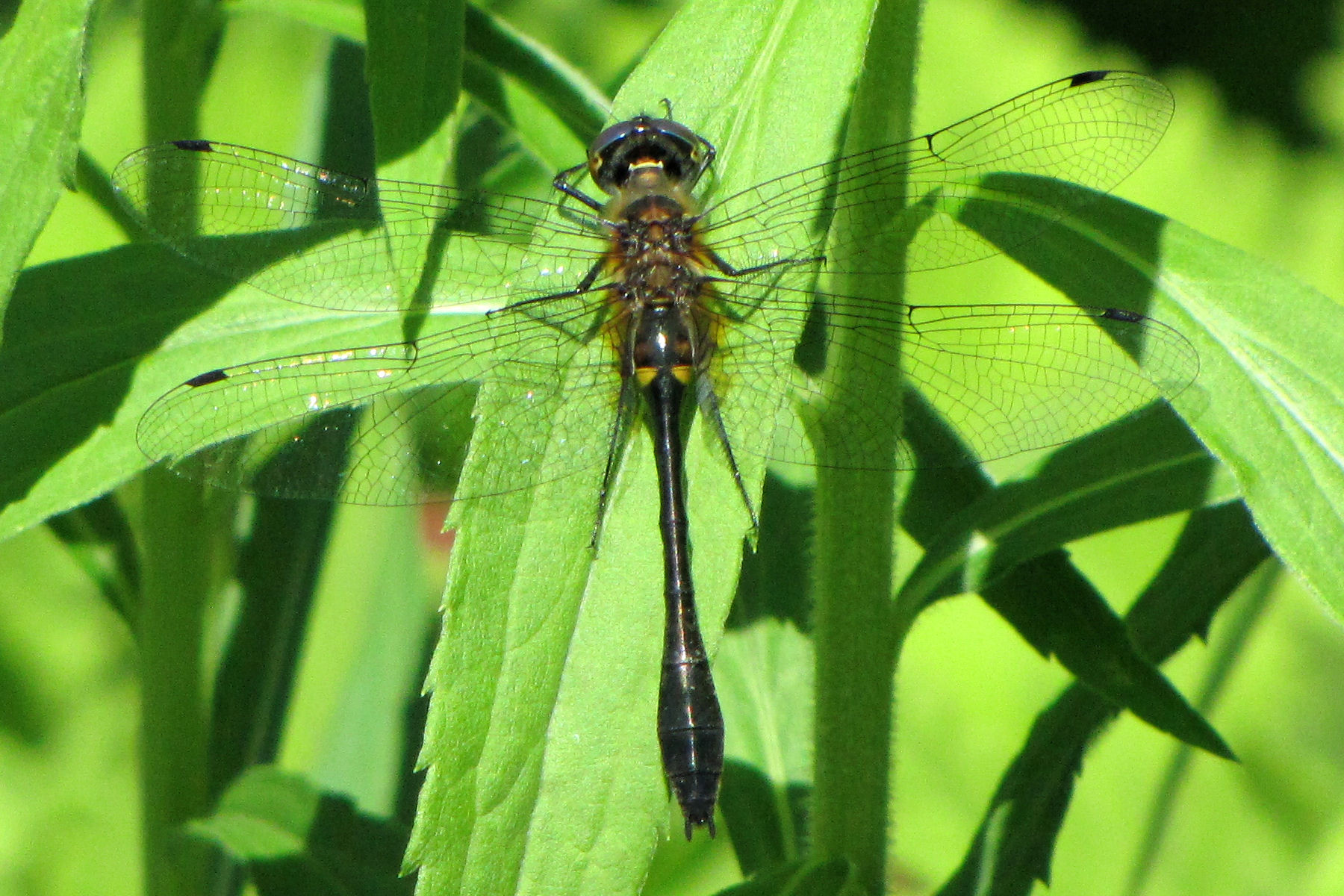
Racket-tailed emerald (Dorocordulia libera)

- Dorocordulia libera, racket-tailed emerald
- Dorocordulia lepida, petite emerald

=== Genus Helocordulia ===
- Helocordulia uhleri, Uhler's sundragon

=== Genus Williamsonia ===
- Williamsonia fletcheri, ebony boghaunter

=== Genus Epitheca ===
- Epitheca princeps, prince baskettail
- Epitheca cynosura, common baskettail

=== Genus Somatochlora ===
- Somatochlora albicincta, ringed emerald
- Somatochlora brevicincta, Quebec emerald
- Somatochlora cingulata, lake emerald
- Somatochlora elongata, ski-tailed emerald
- Somatochlora ensigera, plains emerald
- Somatochlora forcipata, forcipate emerald
- Somatochlora franklini, delicate emerald
- Somatochlora hineana, Hine's emerald
- Somatochlora hudsonica, Hudsonian emerald
- Somatochlora incurvata, incurvate emerald
- Somatochlora kennedyi, Kennedy's emerald
- Somatochlora minor, ocellated emerald
- Somatochlora sahlbergi, treeline emerald
- Somatochlora semicircularis, mountain emerald
- Somatochlora septentrionalis, muskeg emerald
- Somatochlora tenebrosa, clamp-tipped emerald
- Somatochlora walshii, brush-tipped emerald
- Somatochlora williamsoni, Williamson's emerald
- Somatochlora whitehousei, Whitehouse's emerald

=== Genus Neurocordulia ===
- Neurocordulia yamaskanensis, Stygian shadowdragon

== Family Libellulidae, skimmers, chasers ==
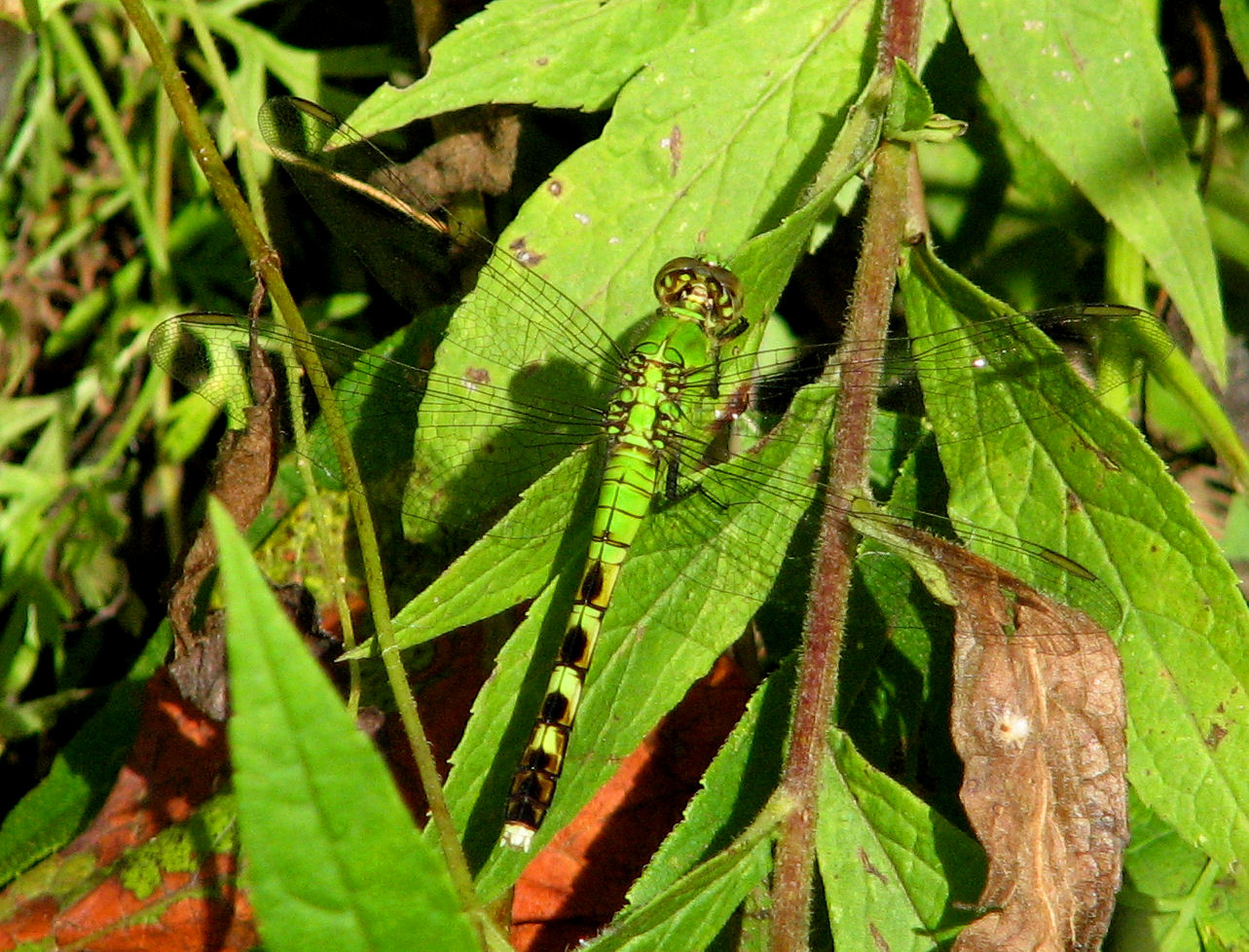
Common pondhawk (Erythemis simplicicollis)

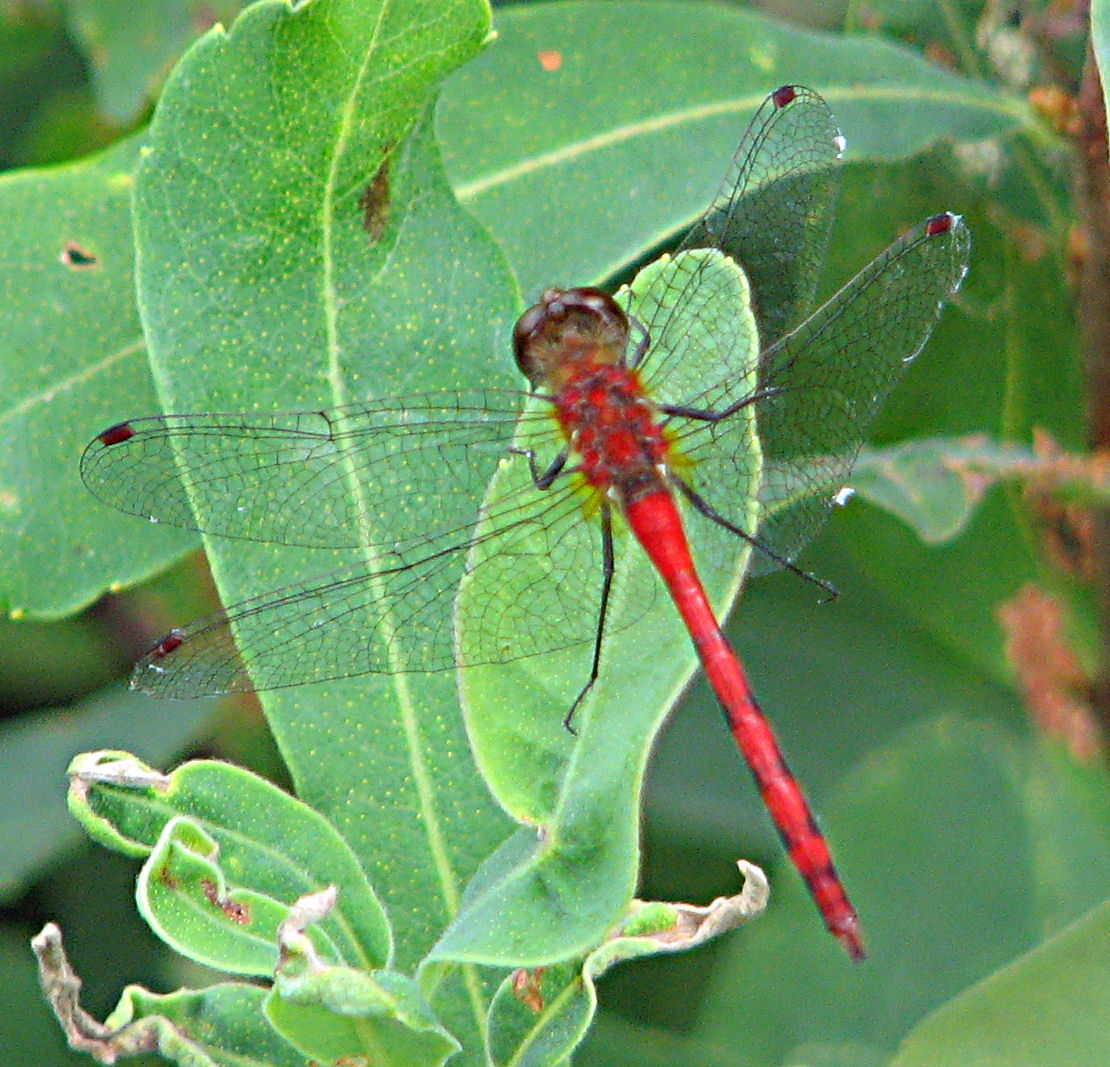
White-faced meadowhawk (Sympetrum obtrusum)

=== Genus Libellula ===
- Libellula depressa, broad-bodied chaser
- Libellula forensis, eight-spotted skimmer
- Libellula fulva, scarce chaser
- Libellula incesta, slaty skimmer
- Libellula julia, chalk-fronted corporal
- Libellula luctuosa, widow skimmer
- Libellula lydia, common whitetail
- Libellula pulchella, twelve-spotted skimmer
- Libellula quadrimaculata, four-spotted chaser

=== Genus Sympetrum ===
- Sympetrum corruptum, variegated meadowhawk
- Sympetrum costiferum, saffron-winged meadowhawk
- Sympetrum danae, black meadowhawk
- Sympetrum illotum, cardinal meadowhawk
- Sympetrum internum, cherry-faced meadowhawk
- Sympetrum flaveolum, yellow-winged darter
- Sympetrum fonscolombii, red-veined darter
- Sympetrum obtrusum, white-faced meadowhawk
- Sympetrum pallipes, striped meadowhawk
- Sympetrum madidum, red-veined meadowhawk
- Sympetrum rubicundulum, ruby meadowhawk
- Sympetrum semicinctum, band-winged meadowhawk
- Sympetrum striolatum, common darter
- Sympetrum vicinum, autumn meadowhawk or yellow-legged meadowhawk
- Sympetrum vulgatum, vagrant darter

=== Genus Nannothemis ===
- Nannothemis bella, elfin skimmer

=== Genus Pachydiplax ===
- Pachydiplax longipennis, blue dasher

=== Genus Erythemis ===
- Erythemis collocata, western pondhawk
- Erythemis simplicicollis, common pondhawk or eastern pondhawk

=== Genus Pantala ===
- Pantala flavescens, wandering glider
- Pantala hymenaea, spot-winged glider

=== Genus Leucorrhinia ===
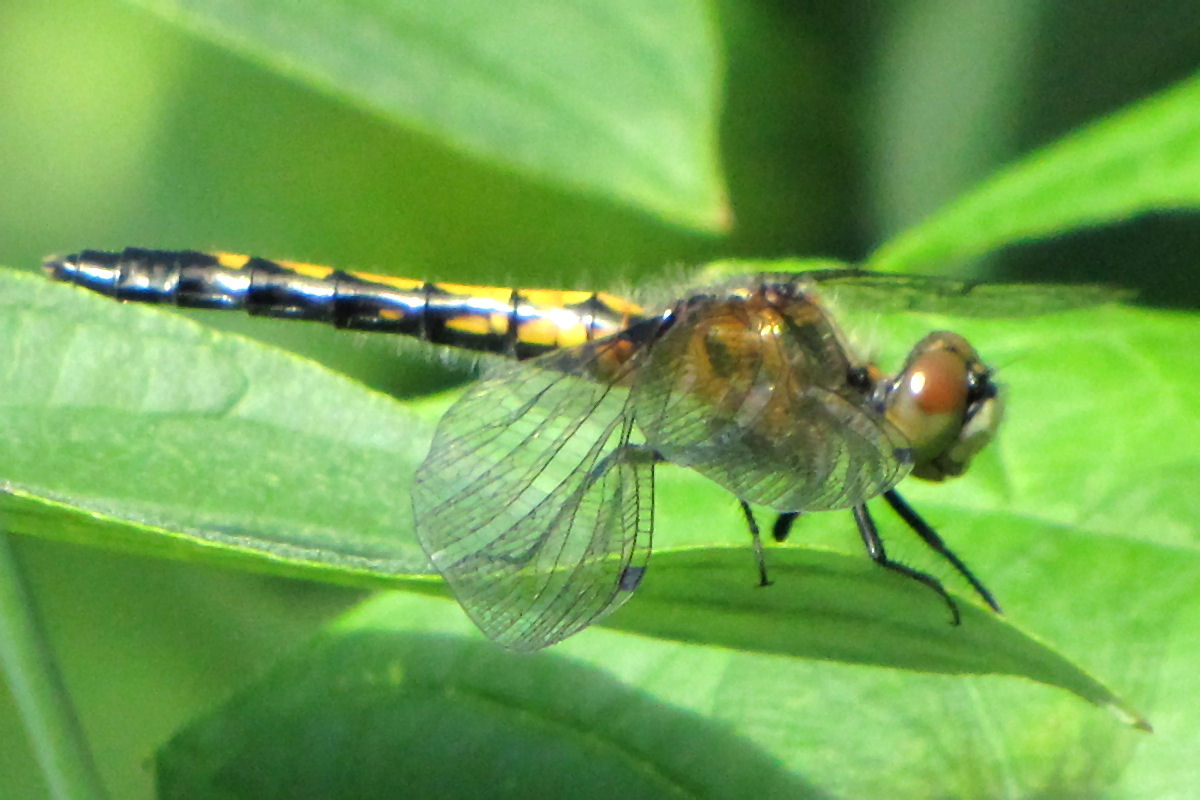
Belted whiteface (Leucorrhinia proxima)

- Leucorrhinia borealis, boreal whiteface
- Leucorrhinia frigida, frosted whiteface
- Leucorrhinia glacialis, crimson-ringed whiteface
- Leucorrhinia hudsonica, Hudsonian whiteface
- Leucorrhinia intacta, dot-tailed whiteface
- Leucorrhinia patricia, Canada whiteface
- Leucorrhinia proxima, belted whiteface

=== Genus Celithemis ===
- Celithemis elisa, calico pennant
- Celithemis eponina, Halloween pennant

=== Genus Perithemis ===
- Perithemis tenera, Eastern Amberwing

=== Genus Tramea ===
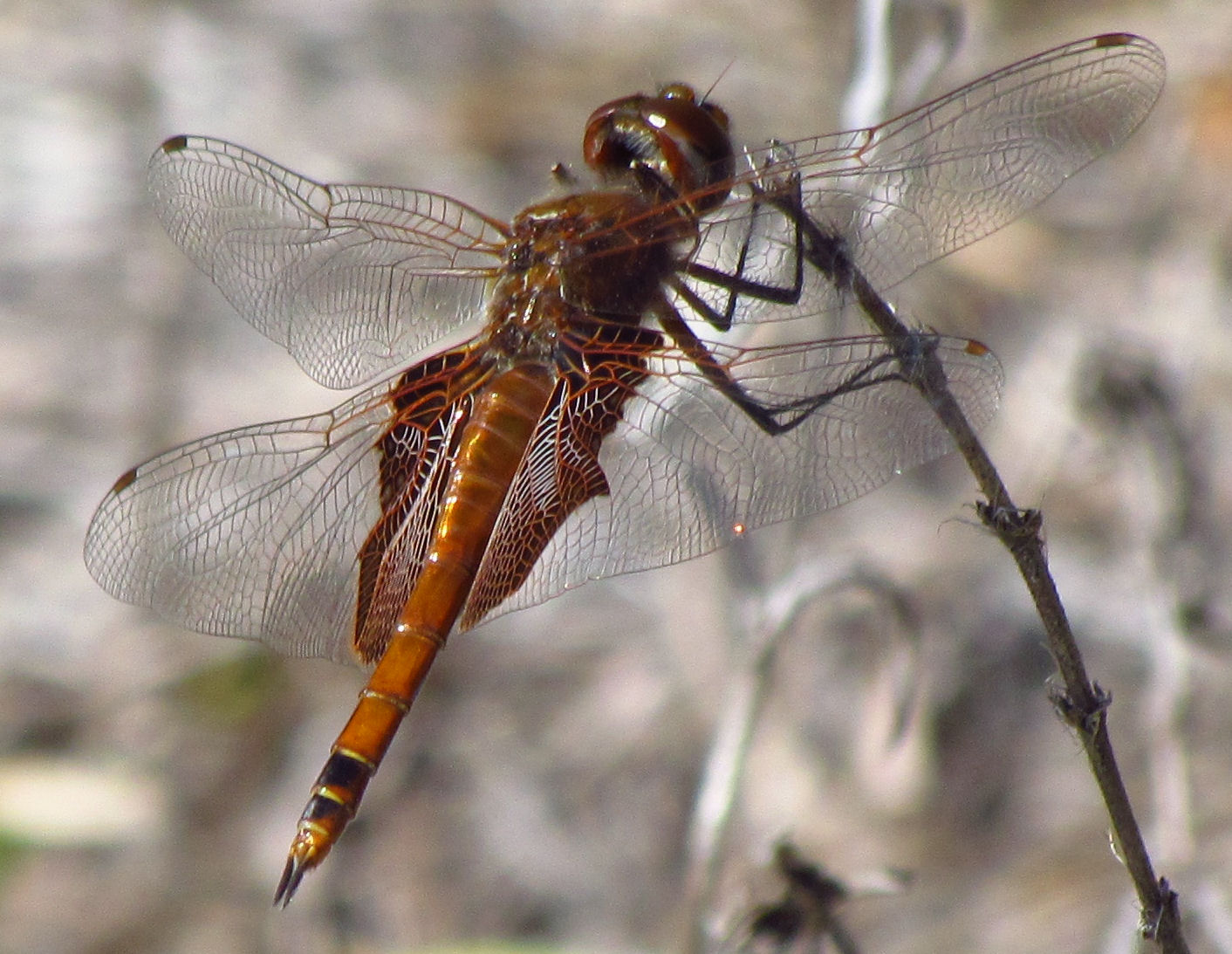
Red-mantled saddlebags (Tramea onusta)

- Tramea carolina, Carolina saddlebags
- Tramea lacerata, black saddlebags
- Tramea onusta, red-mantled saddlebags

== Family Macromiidae, cruisers ==
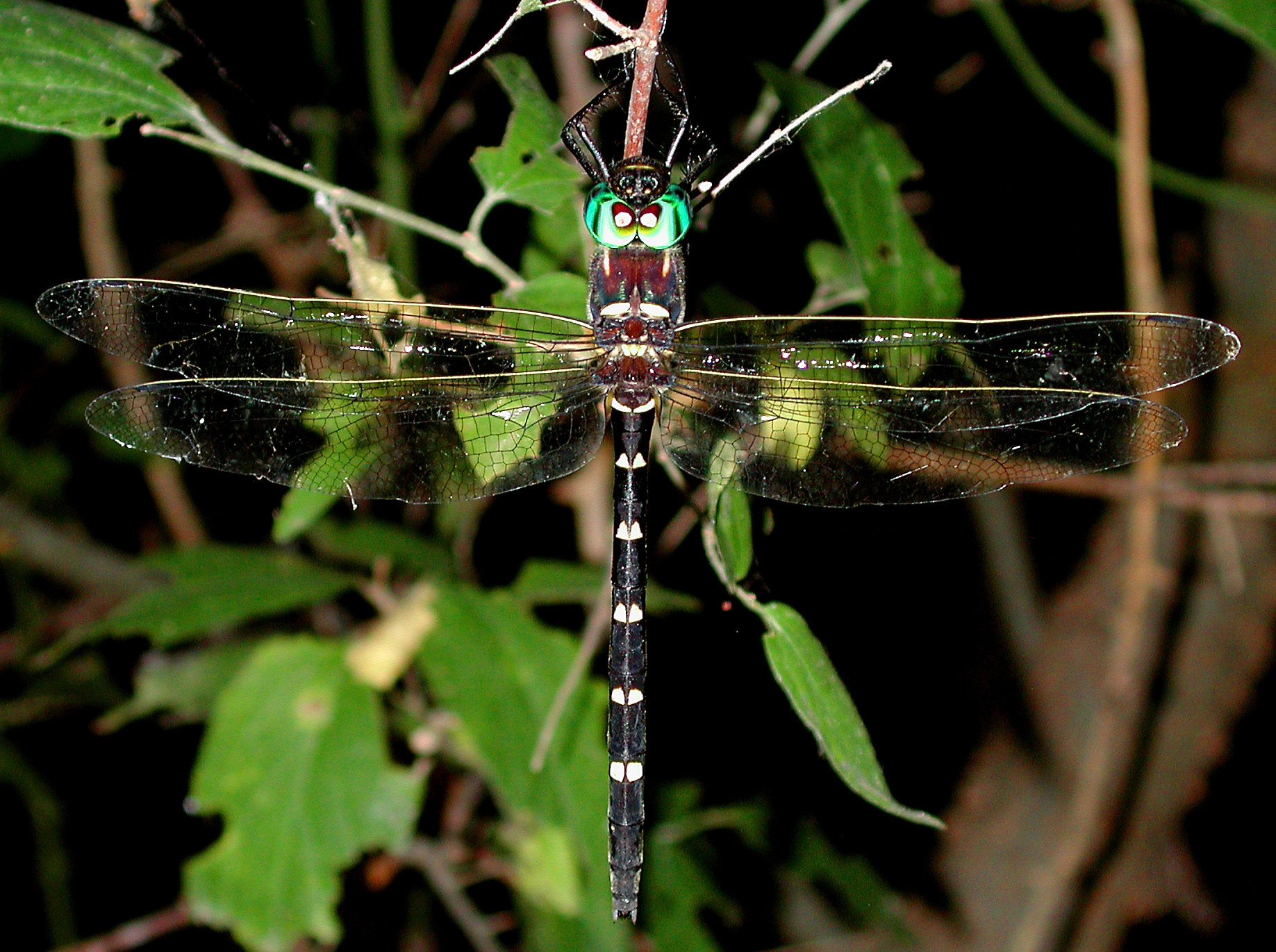
Illinois river cruiser (Macromia illinoiensis)

=== Genus Didymops ===
- Didymops transversa, stream cruiser

=== Genus Macromia ===
- Macromia illinoiensis, Illinois river cruiser or swift river cruiser
- Macromia magnifica, western river cruiser

== Family Petaluridae, petaltails ==
=== Genus Tanypteryx ===
- Tanypteryx hageni, black petaltail

== See also ==
- List of butterflies of Canada
- List of moths of Canada
- List of damselflies of Canada
