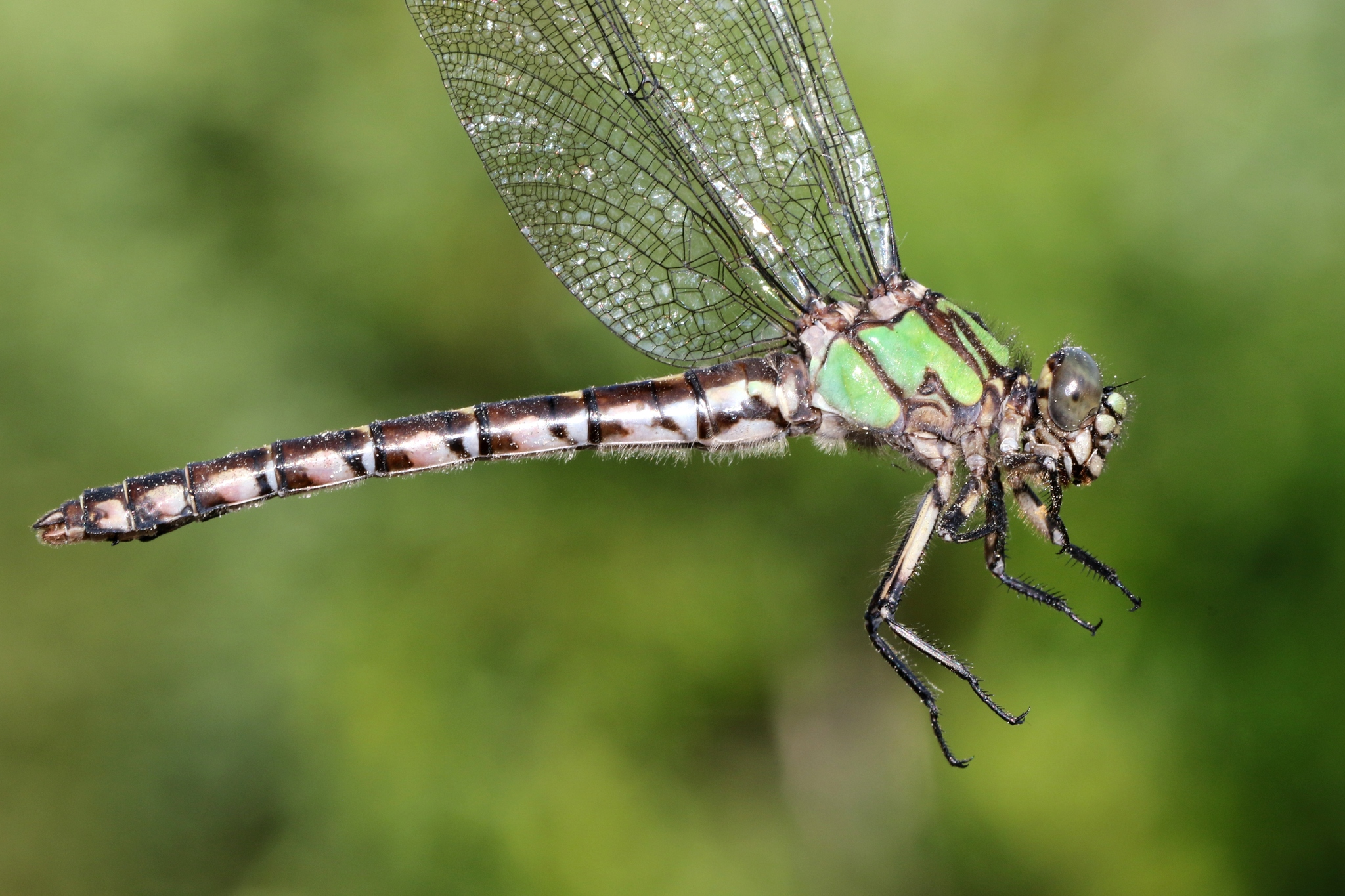
- Female, Grands-Jardins National Park, Quebec
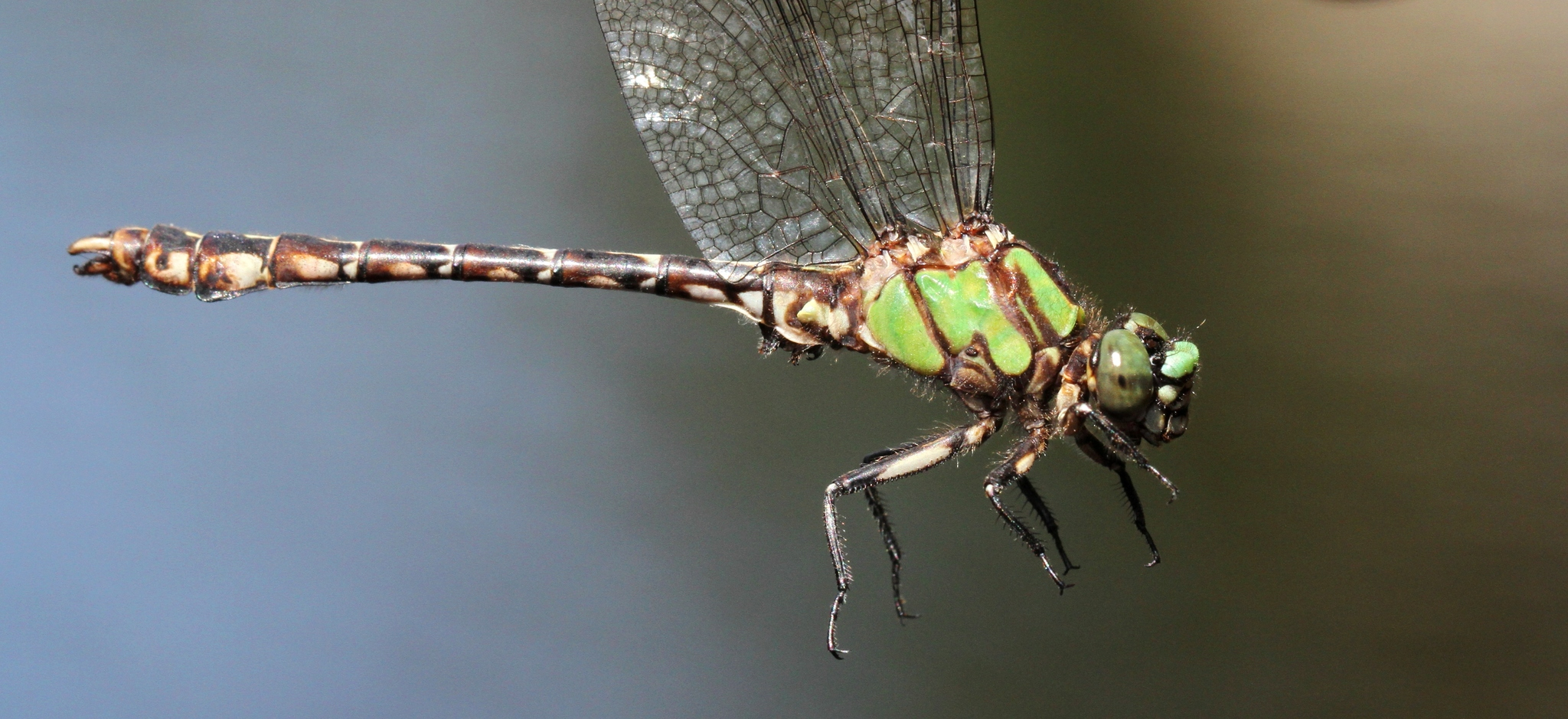
- Male, Laurentides Wildlife Reserve, Quebec

Conservation status
- Least Concern (IUCN 3.1)

- Secure (NatureServe)

Scientific classification
- Kingdom: Animalia
- Phylum: Arthropoda
- Clade: Pancrustacea
- Class: Insecta
- Order: Odonata
- Infraorder: Anisoptera
- Family: Gomphidae
- Genus: Ophiogomphus
- Species: O. colubrinus

Binomial name
- Ophiogomphus colubrinus Selys, 1854

= Ophiogomphus colubrinus =

Species of dragonfly

Ophiogomphus colubrinus, the boreal snaketail, is a species of clubtail in the dragonfly family Gomphidae. It is found in North America.

The IUCN conservation status of Ophiogomphus colubrinus is "LC", least concern, with no immediate threat to the species' survival. The population is stable. The IUCN status was reviewed in 2017.

== Taxonomy ==
Ophiogomphus colubrinus is commonly called the "boreal snaketail" in English. In Canadian French, the dragonflies are known as l'Ophiogomphe boréal.

O. colubrinus was first scientifically described in 1854 by Edmond de Sélys, a Belgian politician and zoologist considered a "founder of odonatology" de Sélys' description, published in a paper in the Bulletins of the Royal Academy of Science, Letters and Fine Arts of Belgium, was based off a specimen in his collection from "Hudson Bay territory".

A 2016 phylogenetic study of North American clubtail dragonflies published in Systematic Entomology examined every species of Ophiogomphus found on that continent. The authors, led by Canadian–American biologist Jessica Ware, were thus able to look at phylogenetic relationships within the genus. The study used both maximum likelihood and Bayesian analysis techniques based on molecular data to produce a phylogenetic tree of the Gomphidae. The result of their phylogenetic analysis suggested O. colubrinus was sister to a clade of five species, as shown below.

Proposed cladogram for O. colubrinus and selected related species

- Ophiogomphus
  - Ophiogomphus cecilia
  - - - Ophiogomphus colubrinus
      - - Ophiogomphus morrisoni
        - - Ophiogomphus bison
          - - Ophiogomphus occidentis
            - - Ophiogomphus arizonicus
              - Ophiogomphus severus
    - Other species

After Ware, Pilgrim, May, & Donnelly (2016) p. 4

=== Subgeneric placement ===
De Sélys placed his species in a group of Ophiogomphus species he called the serpentinus, identifiable by brown pterostigmata and a yellow head and thorax patterned with brown markings. The serpentinus group comprised O. colubrinus (Canada), O. serpentinus (= O. cecilia; Europe), and O. cerastis (Nepal), and was itself classified into the nominate subgenus, Ophiogomphus. O. colubrinus has been since placed in the nominate subgenus. The 2016 phylogenetic study found that the subgenus Ophiogomphus formed "a rather well-defined clade" but excluded the genus' type species, Ophiogomphus cecilia. Should the topology of the tree was confirmed by a later study, the name of the subgenus would have to be changed from Ophiogomphus if it was circumscribed to exclude the type species.

== Conservation ==
NatureServe, an American non-profit, has assessed the global conservation status of O. colubrinus as Secure (G5), most recently in 2026. In Canada, the species is rated Secure (N5), but is Apparently Secure (N4) in the United States. NatureServe has also published sub-national assessments of the species' conservation status in eight Canadian provinces, two territories, and three American states, with the species being imperilled or endangered in several jurisdictions, especially in New York, where it is critically imperilled.

NatureServe subnational conservation statuses
Jurisdictions	Status
Québec	S5
Northwest Territories, Alberta, Saskatchewan, Ontario, and Wisconsin	S4
Yukon, British Columbia, Manitoba, and Newfoundland (Note: Newfoundland and Labrador are assessed separately; Labrador is not listed.)	S3
New Brunswick and Maine	S2
New York	S1
Minnesota, Michigan, and New Hampshire	SNR

According to NatureServe, the main threats to O. colubrinus are pollution, associated habitat degradation, changes to waterways caused by the construction of dams, and habitat loss caused by climate change. The species benefits from having a large range, being relatively common, and being somewhat resilient and tolerant to disturbed habitat. NatureServe believes both the long-term and short-term population trends to be relatively stable.

The IUCN Red List includes an assessment of O. colubrinus published in 2014 and reviewed in 2017, where it was judged to be of "Least Concern", although the IUCN itself notes that the assessment needs updating. Like NatureServe, the IUCN judged the population to be stable.

== Bibliography ==
- Carle, Frank L. (1 June 1992). "Ophiogomphus (Ophionurus) australis spec. nov. from the Gulf coast of Louisiana, with larval and adult keys to American Ophiogomphus (Anisoptera: Gomphidae)" (PDF). Odonatologica. 21 (2): 141–152.
- Ware, Jessica; Pilgrim, Erik; et al. (18 November 2016). "Phylogenetic relationships of North American Gomphidae and their close relatives". Systematic Entomology. 42 (2). Royal Entomological Society: 347–358. doi:10.1111/syen.12218. PMC 6104399.
