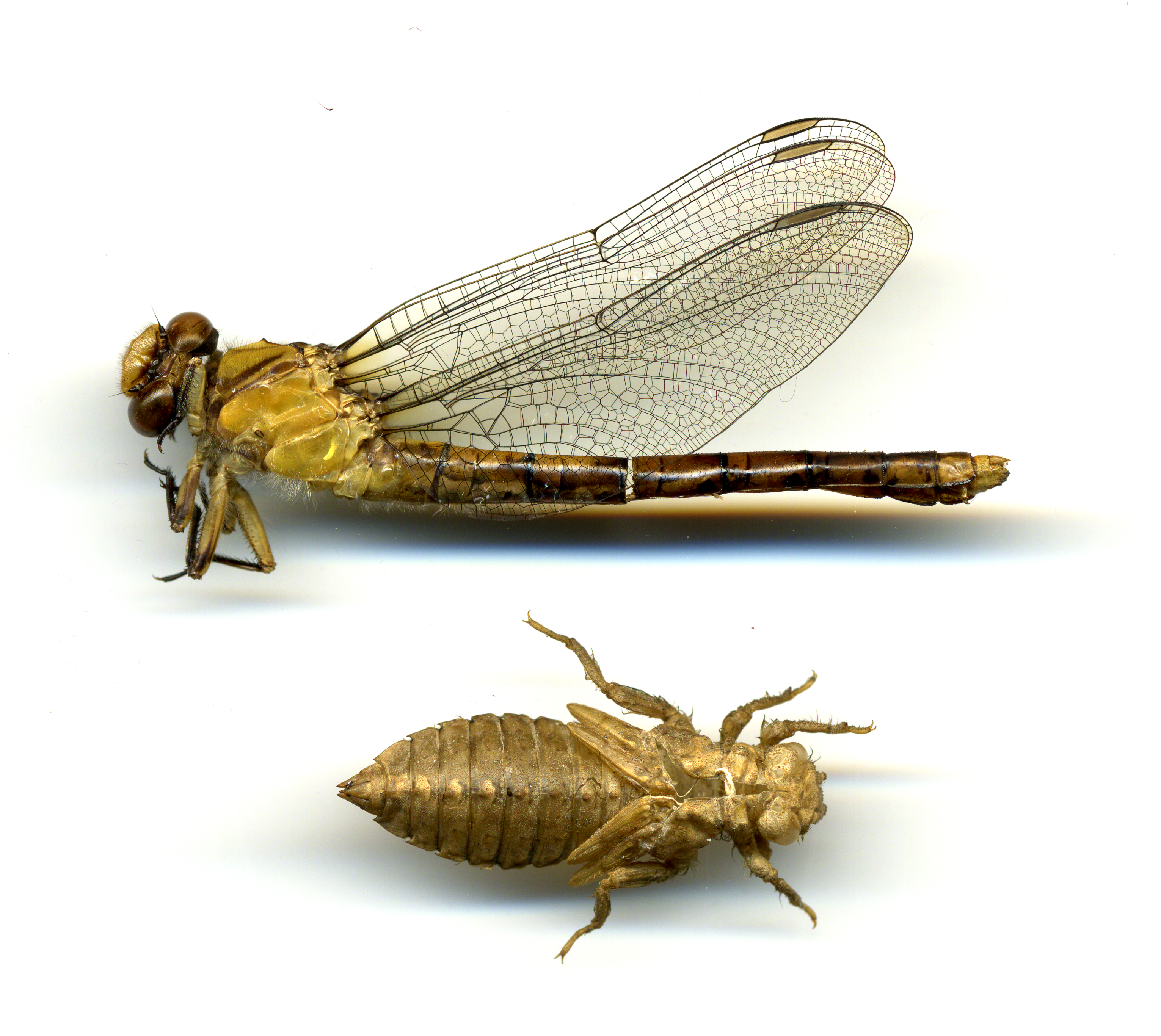

Conservation status
- Near Threatened (IUCN 3.1)

Scientific classification
- Kingdom: Animalia
- Phylum: Arthropoda
- Class: Insecta
- Order: Odonata
- Infraorder: Anisoptera
- Family: Gomphidae
- Genus: Ophiogomphus
- Species: O. acuminatus

Binomial name
- Ophiogomphus acuminatus Carle, 1981

= Ophiogomphus acuminatus =

Species of dragonfly

Ophiogomphus acuminatus, the acuminate snaketail, is a species of dragonfly in the family Gomphidae. It is endemic to the United States, where it is known from Alabama and Tennessee. Its natural habitat is rivers.
