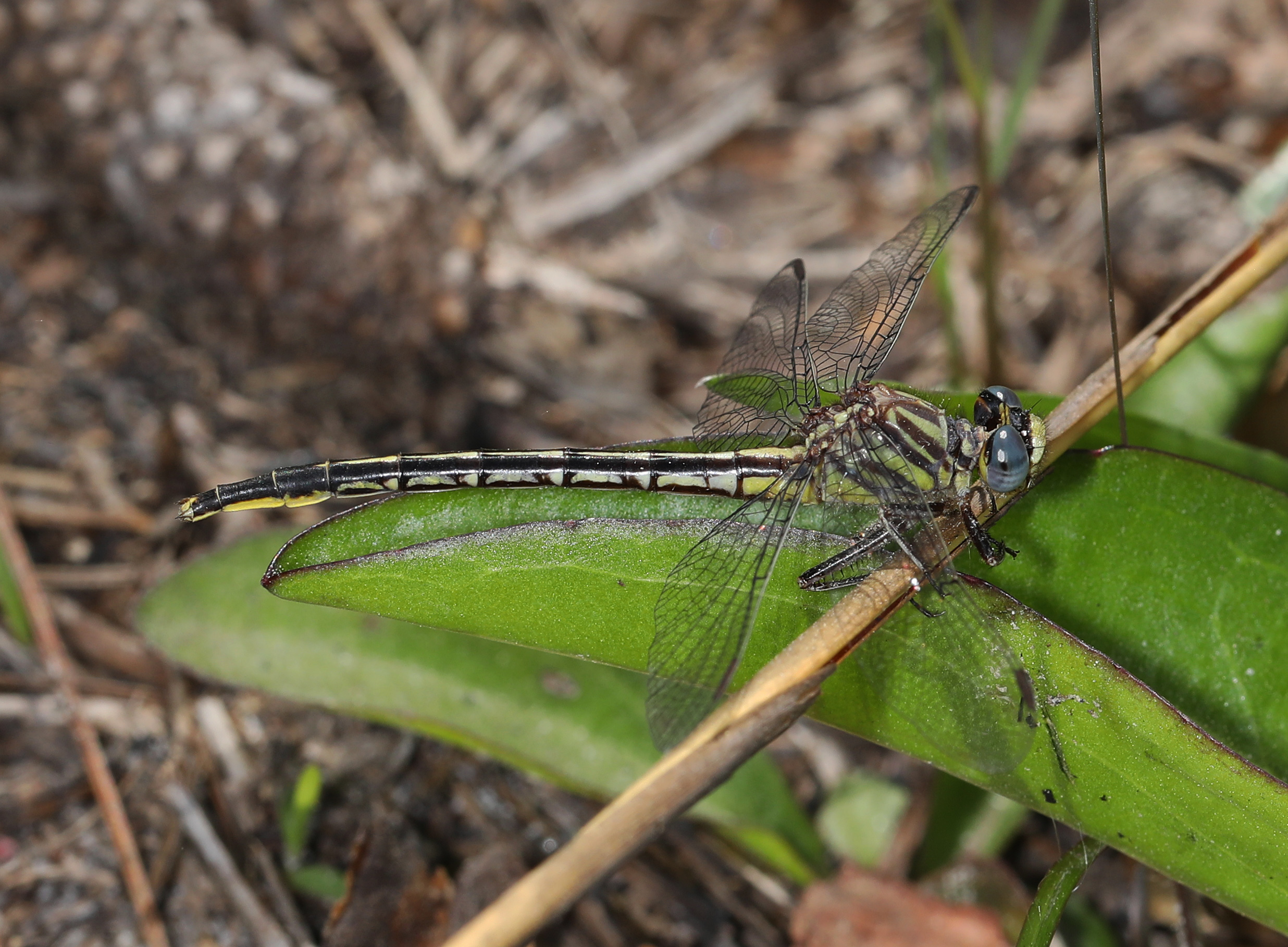

Conservation status
- Least Concern (IUCN 3.1)

Scientific classification
- Domain: Eukaryota
- Kingdom: Animalia
- Phylum: Arthropoda
- Class: Insecta
- Order: Odonata
- Infraorder: Anisoptera
- Family: Gomphidae
- Genus: Ophiogomphus
- Species: O. westfalli

Binomial name
- Ophiogomphus westfalli Cook & Daigle, 1985

= Ophiogomphus westfalli =

Species of dragonfly

Ophiogomphus westfalli, or Westfall's snaketail, is a species of clubtail in the family of dragonflies known as Gomphidae. It is found in North America.

The IUCN conservation status of Ophiogomphus westfalli is "LC", least concern, with no immediate threat to the species' survival. The population is stable.
