= Ophiogomphus edmundo =

Conservation status
- Near Threatened (IUCN 3.1)

Scientific classification
- Kingdom: Animalia
- Phylum: Arthropoda
- Class: Insecta
- Order: Odonata
- Infraorder: Anisoptera
- Family: Gomphidae
- Genus: Ophiogomphus
- Species: O. edmundo

Binomial name
- Ophiogomphus edmundo Needham, 1951

Species of dragonfly

Ophiogomphus edmundo, the Edmund's snaketail, is a species of dragonfly in the family Gomphidae. It is endemic to the United States. Its natural habitat is rivers. It is threatened by habitat loss.
