= Ophiogomphus incurvatus =

Conservation status
- Least Concern (IUCN 3.1)

Scientific classification
- Kingdom: Animalia
- Phylum: Arthropoda
- Class: Insecta
- Order: Odonata
- Infraorder: Anisoptera
- Family: Gomphidae
- Genus: Ophiogomphus
- Species: O. incurvatus

Binomial name
- Ophiogomphus incurvatus Carle, 1982

Synonyms
- Ophiogomphus incurvatus ssp. alleghaniensis Carle, 1982

Species of dragonfly

Ophiogomphus incurvatus, the Appalachian snaketail, is a species of dragonfly in the family Gomphidae. It is endemic to the United States. Its natural habitat is intermittent rivers.
