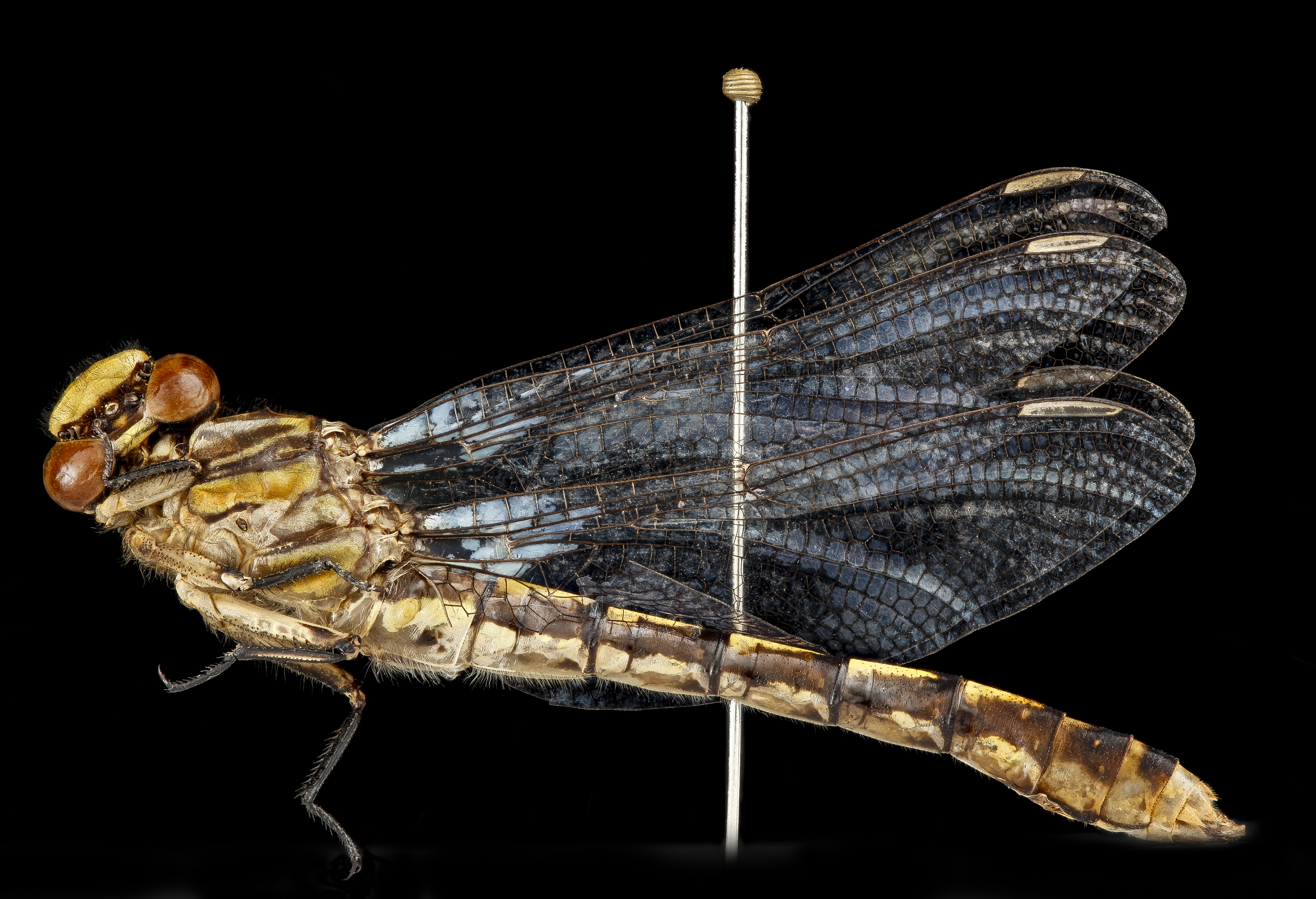

Conservation status
- Least Concern (IUCN 3.1)

Scientific classification
- Domain: Eukaryota
- Kingdom: Animalia
- Phylum: Arthropoda
- Class: Insecta
- Order: Odonata
- Infraorder: Anisoptera
- Family: Gomphidae
- Genus: Ophiogomphus
- Species: O. susbehcha

Binomial name
- Ophiogomphus susbehcha Vogt & Smith, 1993

= Ophiogomphus susbehcha =

Species of dragonfly

Ophiogomphus susbehcha, the St. Croix snaketail, is a species of clubtail in the family of dragonflies known as Gomphidae. It is found in North America.

The IUCN conservation status of Ophiogomphus susbehcha is "LC", least concern, with no immediate threat to the species' survival. The population is stable.

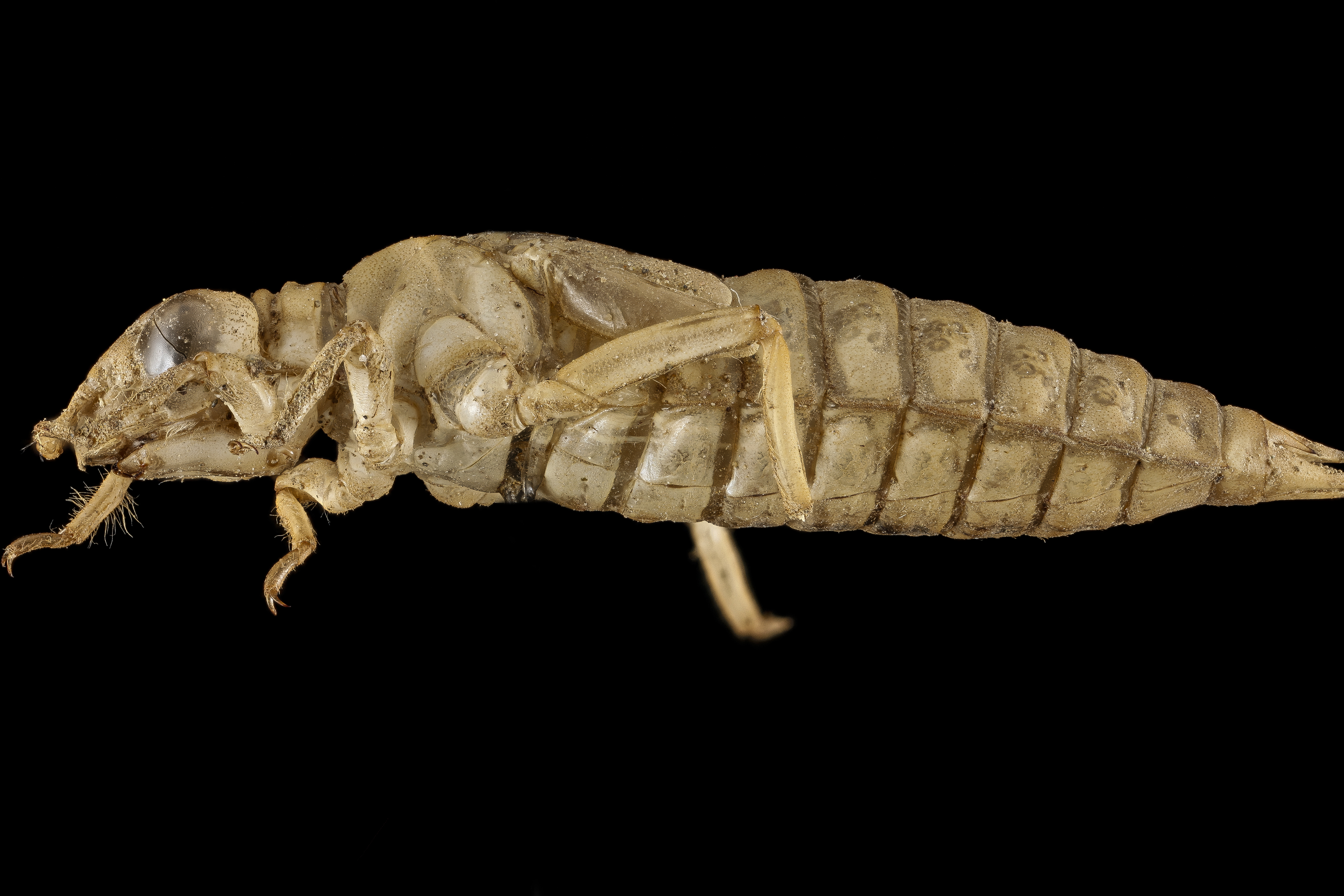
St. Croix snaketail, Ophiogomphus susbehcha
