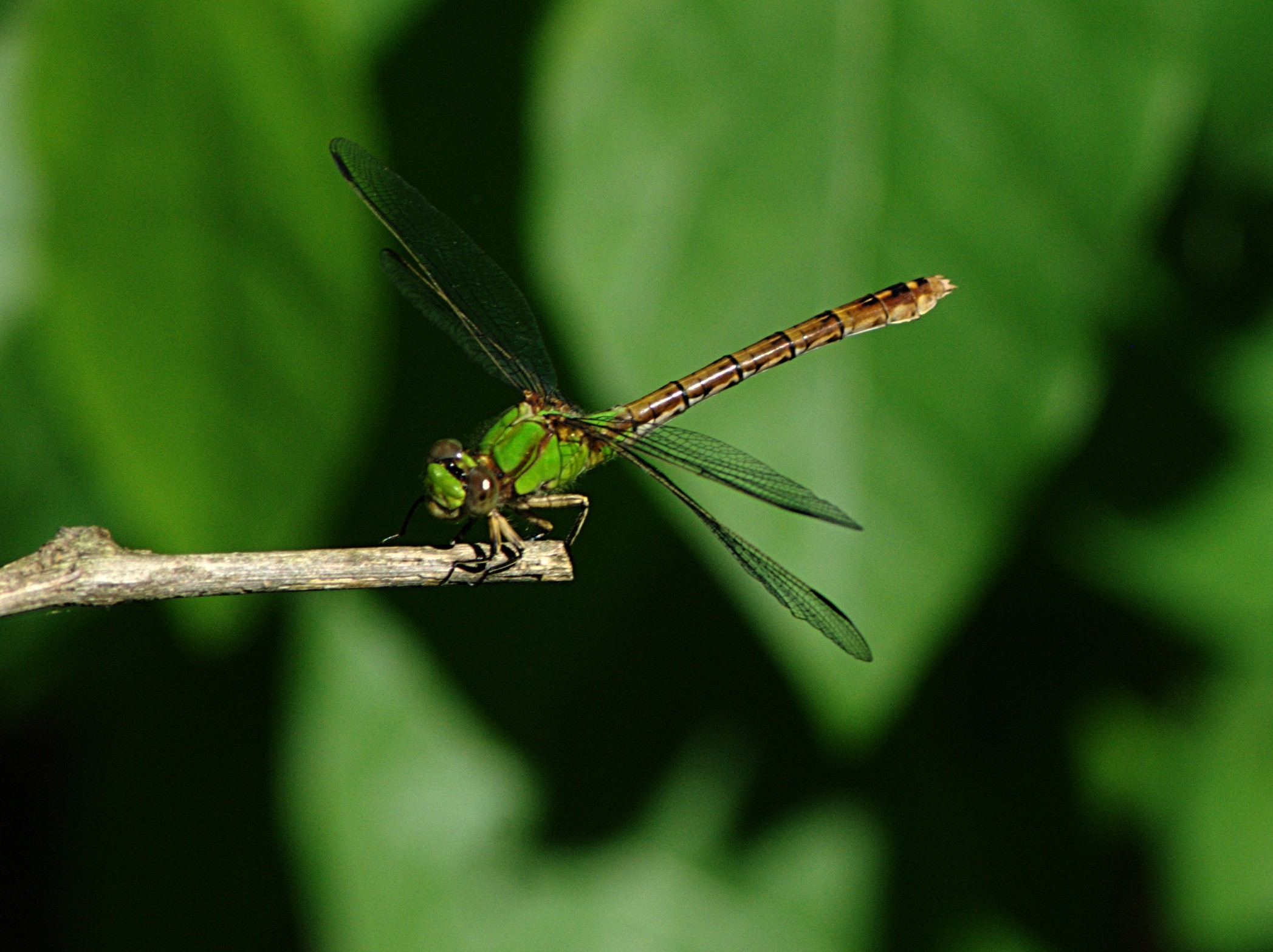

Conservation status
- Least Concern (IUCN 3.1)

Scientific classification
- Kingdom: Animalia
- Phylum: Arthropoda
- Class: Insecta
- Order: Odonata
- Infraorder: Anisoptera
- Family: Gomphidae
- Genus: Ophiogomphus
- Species: O. rupinsulensis

Binomial name
- Ophiogomphus rupinsulensis (Walsh, 1862)

Synonyms
- Ophiogomphus carolinus (Hagen, 1885)

= Ophiogomphus rupinsulensis =

Species of dragonfly

Ophiogomphus rupinsulensis, the rusty snaketail, is a species of clubtail in the family of dragonflies known as Gomphidae. It is found in North America.

The IUCN conservation status of Ophiogomphus rupinsulensis is "LC", least concern, with no immediate threat to the species' survival. The population is stable.

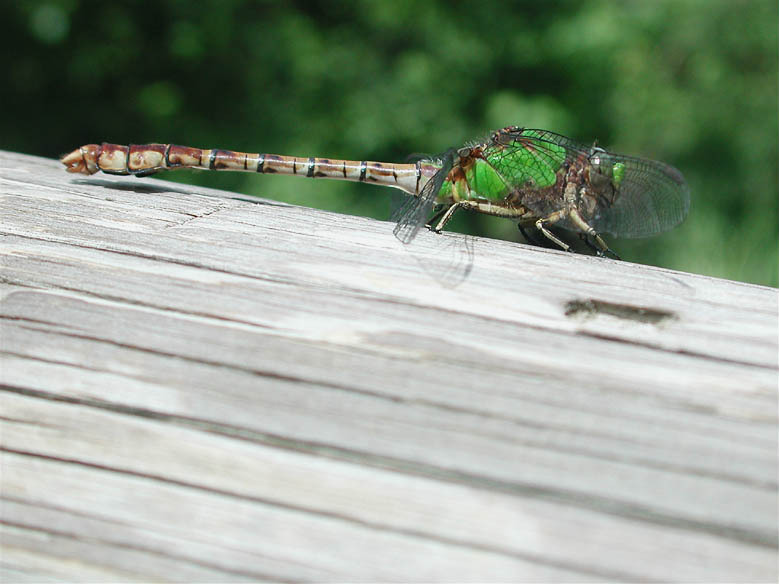
Rusty snaketail, Ophiogomphus rupinsulensis

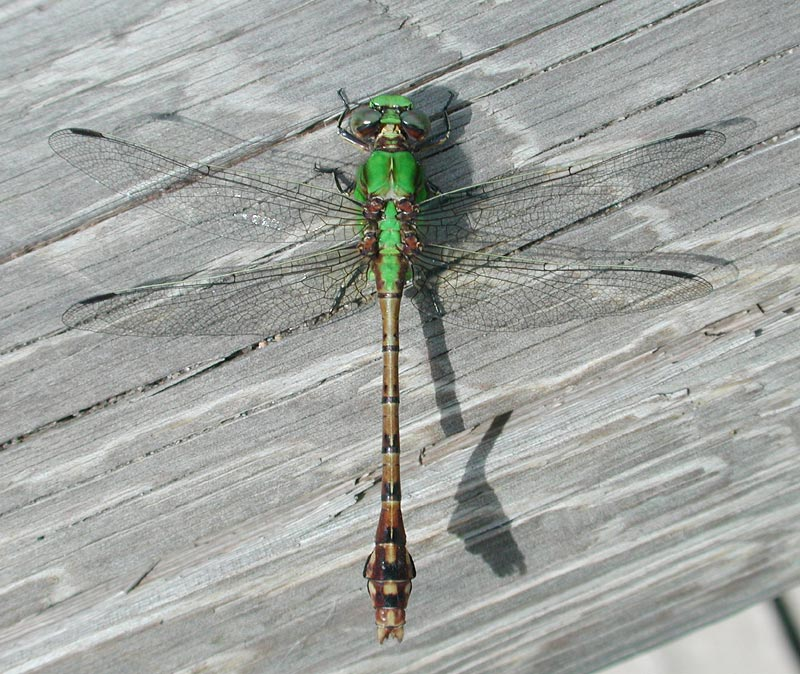
Rusty snaketail, Ophiogomphus rupinsulensis
