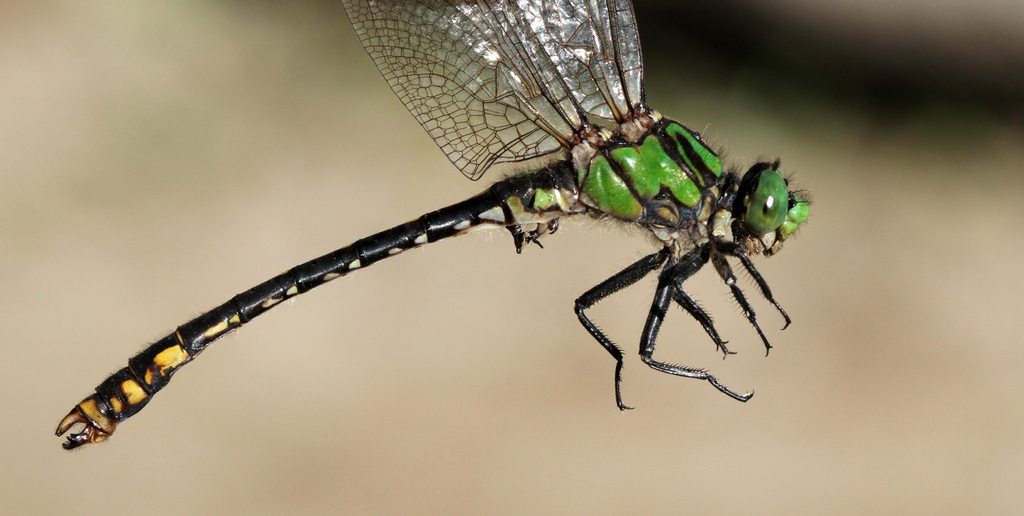

Conservation status
- Least Concern (IUCN 3.1)

Scientific classification
- Kingdom: Animalia
- Phylum: Arthropoda
- Class: Insecta
- Order: Odonata
- Infraorder: Anisoptera
- Family: Gomphidae
- Genus: Ophiogomphus
- Species: O. mainensis

Binomial name
- Ophiogomphus mainensis Packard in Walsh, 1863

= Ophiogomphus mainensis =

Species of dragonfly

Ophiogomphus mainensis, the Maine snaketail, is a species of clubtail in the family of dragonflies known as Gomphidae. It is found in North America.

The IUCN conservation status of Ophiogomphus mainensis is "LC", least concern, with no immediate threat to the species' survival. The population is stable.

== Subspecies ==
These two subspecies belong to the species Ophiogomphus mainensis:

- Ophiogomphus mainensis fastigiatus Donnelly, 1987^{i c g}
- Ophiogomphus mainensis mainensis Packard, 1863^{i g}

Data sources: i = ITIS, c = Catalogue of Life, g = GBIF, b = Bugguide.net

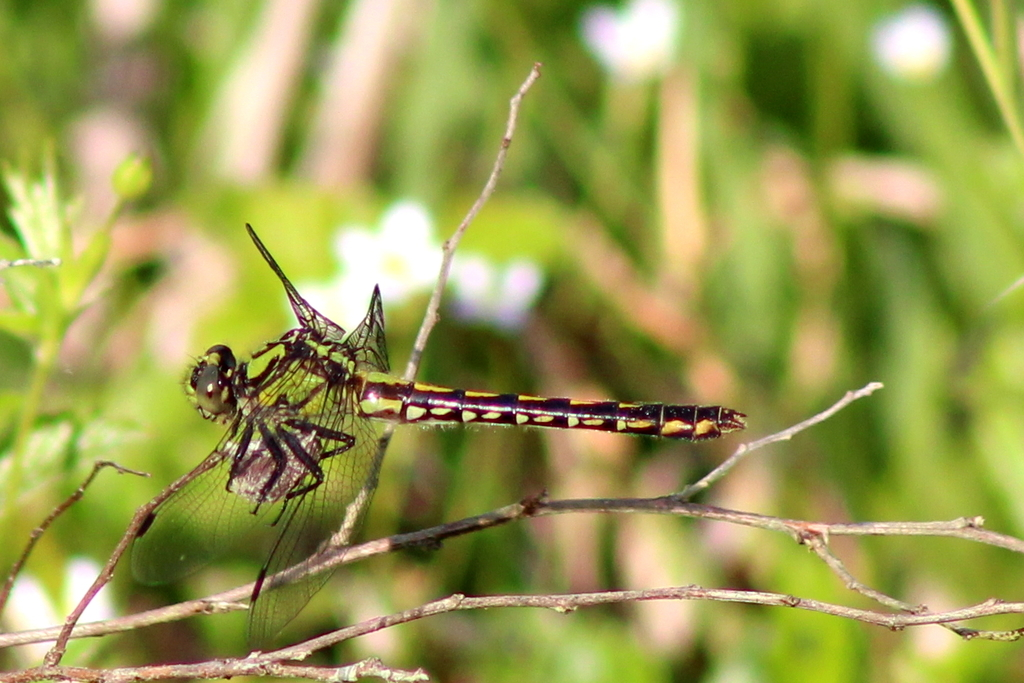
perched on vegetation
