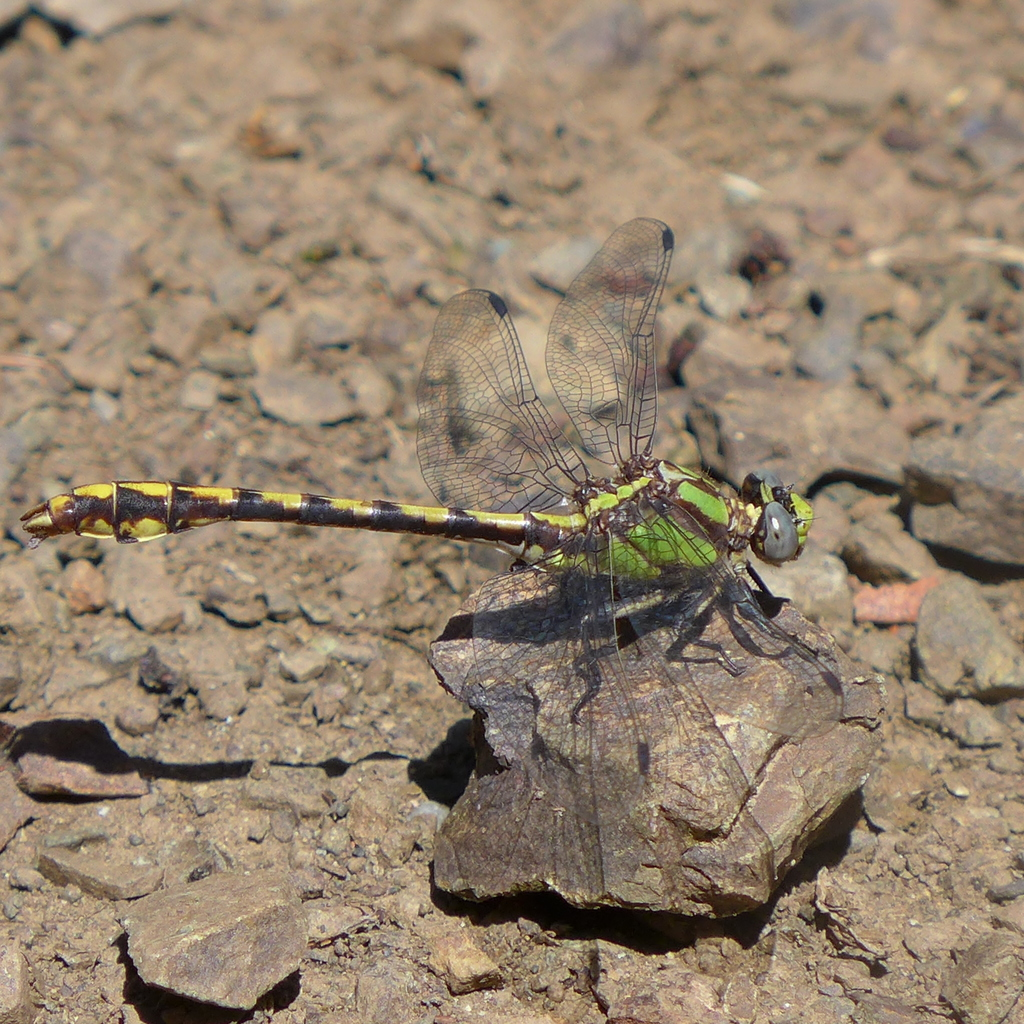

Conservation status
- Least Concern (IUCN 3.1)

Scientific classification
- Kingdom: Animalia
- Phylum: Arthropoda
- Class: Insecta
- Order: Odonata
- Infraorder: Anisoptera
- Family: Gomphidae
- Genus: Ophiogomphus
- Species: O. bison

Binomial name
- Ophiogomphus bison Selys, 1873

= Ophiogomphus bison =

Species of dragonfly

Ophiogomphus bison, the bison snaketail, is a species of clubtail in the dragonfly family Gomphidae. It is found in North America.

The IUCN conservation status of Ophiogomphus bison is "LC", least concern, with no immediate threat to the species' survival. The population is stable. The IUCN status was reviewed in 2017.
