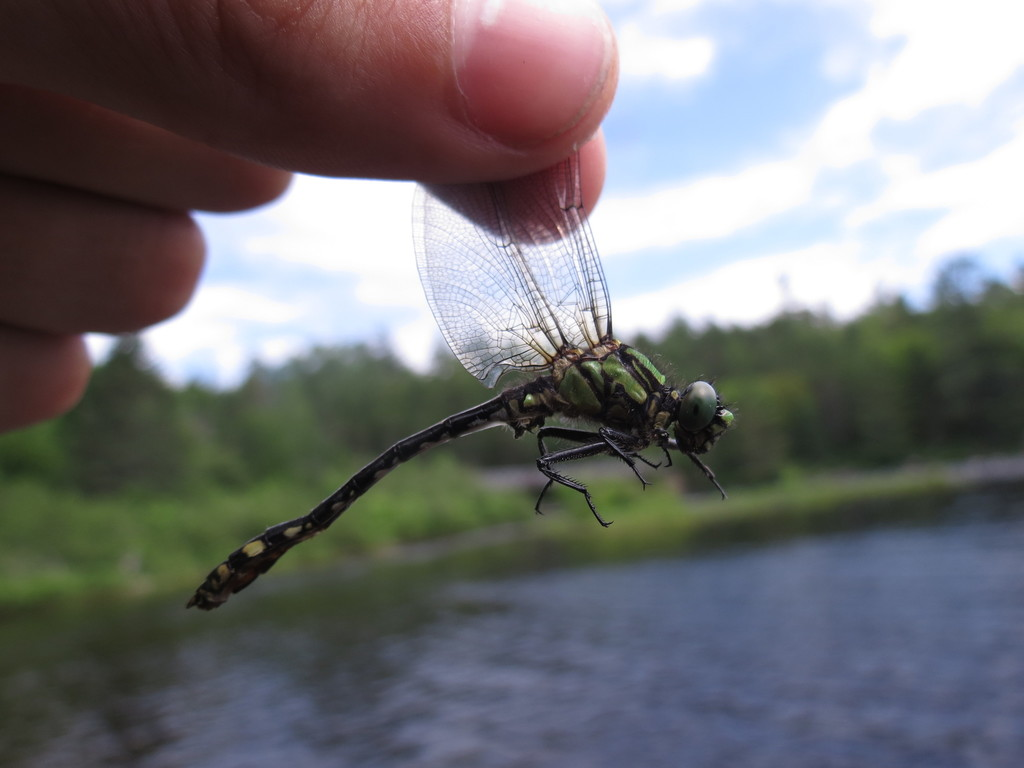

Conservation status
- Least Concern (IUCN 3.1)

Scientific classification
- Kingdom: Animalia
- Phylum: Arthropoda
- Class: Insecta
- Order: Odonata
- Infraorder: Anisoptera
- Family: Gomphidae
- Genus: Ophiogomphus
- Species: O. anomalus

Binomial name
- Ophiogomphus anomalus Harvey, 1898

= Ophiogomphus anomalus =

Species of dragonfly

Ophiogomphus anomalus, the extra-striped snaketail, is a species of dragonfly in the family Gomphidae. It is found in Canada and the United States. Its habitat is rivers.
