= Ophiogomphus smithi =

Conservation status
- Least Concern (IUCN 3.1)

Scientific classification
- Domain: Eukaryota
- Kingdom: Animalia
- Phylum: Arthropoda
- Class: Insecta
- Order: Odonata
- Infraorder: Anisoptera
- Family: Gomphidae
- Genus: Ophiogomphus
- Species: O. smithi

Binomial name
- Ophiogomphus smithi Tennessen & Vogt, 2004

Species of dragonfly

Ophiogomphus smithi, known generally as Sioux snaketail, is a species of clubtail in the family of dragonflies known as Gomphidae. Other common names include the yellow-rayed lasthenium and sand snaketail. It is found in North America.

The IUCN conservation status of Ophiogomphus smithi is "LC", least concern, with no immediate threat to the species' survival. The population is stable.
