= Ophiogomphus howei =

Conservation status
- Least Concern (IUCN 3.1)

Scientific classification
- Kingdom: Animalia
- Phylum: Arthropoda
- Class: Insecta
- Order: Odonata
- Infraorder: Anisoptera
- Family: Gomphidae
- Genus: Ophiogomphus
- Species: O. howei

Binomial name
- Ophiogomphus howei Bromley, 1924

Species of dragonfly

Ophiogomphus howei, the pygmy snaketail, is a species of dragonfly in the family Gomphidae. It is endemic to the United States. Its natural habitat is rivers.

== Characteristics ==
Pygmy snaketails are the smallest Ophiogomphus in North America, where the length of the abdomen is approximately 35 mm and hindwing is approximately 22 mm.

== Life history ==
The pygmy snaketail breeds in streams and rivers. The nymphs emerge on mud banks or low vegetation that is close to the water's edge in areas of the stream where the current is slower. The nymphs emerge over a 4 to 6 day period.

== Habitat ==
Pygmy snaketails live in medium to large fast-flowing rivers and streams. The surrounding areas are undisturbed forested areas with minimal agriculture. The nymphs live in the flowing water and will burrow into the substrate which is a trait common to species in Gomphidae.

== Range ==
Pygmy snaketail ranges are in two geographical areas in North America. The western population is found in the Great Lakes region in the northern half of Wisconsin. While the eastern population is located from New Brunswick, Canada to South Carolina, United States and the western most part reaching Kentucky. Within the range, they are discontinuous and found in localized areas along limited stretches of certain river systems.
