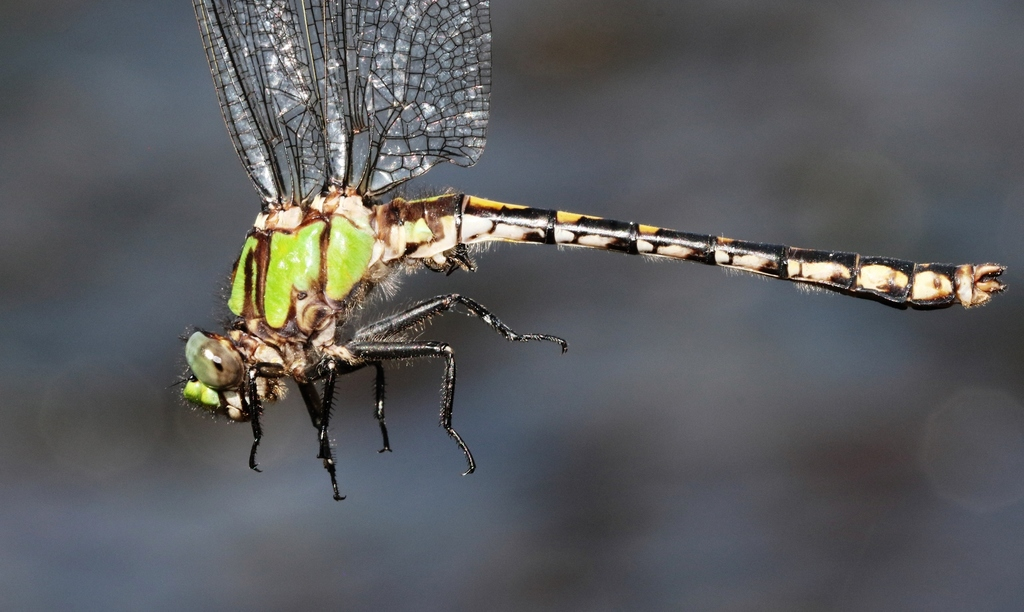

Conservation status
- Least Concern (IUCN 3.1)

Scientific classification
- Kingdom: Animalia
- Phylum: Arthropoda
- Class: Insecta
- Order: Odonata
- Infraorder: Anisoptera
- Family: Gomphidae
- Genus: Ophiogomphus
- Species: O. carolus

Binomial name
- Ophiogomphus carolus Needham, 1897

= Ophiogomphus carolus =

Species of dragonfly

Ophiogomphus carolus, the riffle snaketail, is a species of clubtail in the family of dragonflies known as Gomphidae. It is found in North America.

The IUCN conservation status of Ophiogomphus carolus is "LC", least concern, with no immediate threat to the species' survival. The population is stable.
