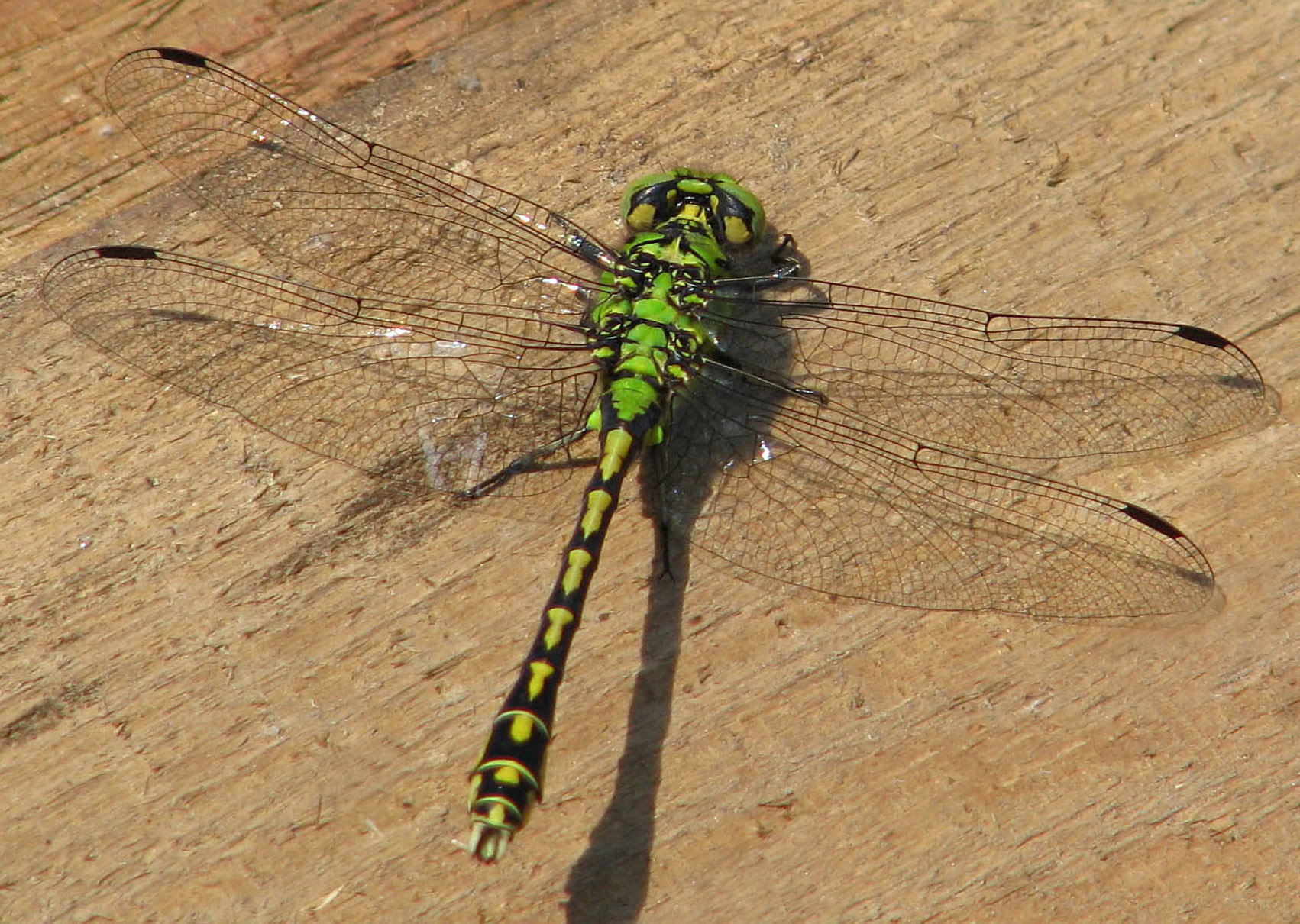

Conservation status
- Least Concern (IUCN 3.1)

Scientific classification
- Kingdom: Animalia
- Phylum: Arthropoda
- Clade: Pancrustacea
- Class: Insecta
- Order: Odonata
- Infraorder: Anisoptera
- Family: Gomphidae
- Genus: Ophiogomphus
- Species: O. cecilia

Binomial name
- Ophiogomphus cecilia (Fourcroy, 1785)

= Ophiogomphus cecilia =

Species of dragonfly

Ophiogomphus cecilia, the green snaketail, green gomphid, or green club-tailed dragonfly, is a species of dragonfly in the family Gomphidae.

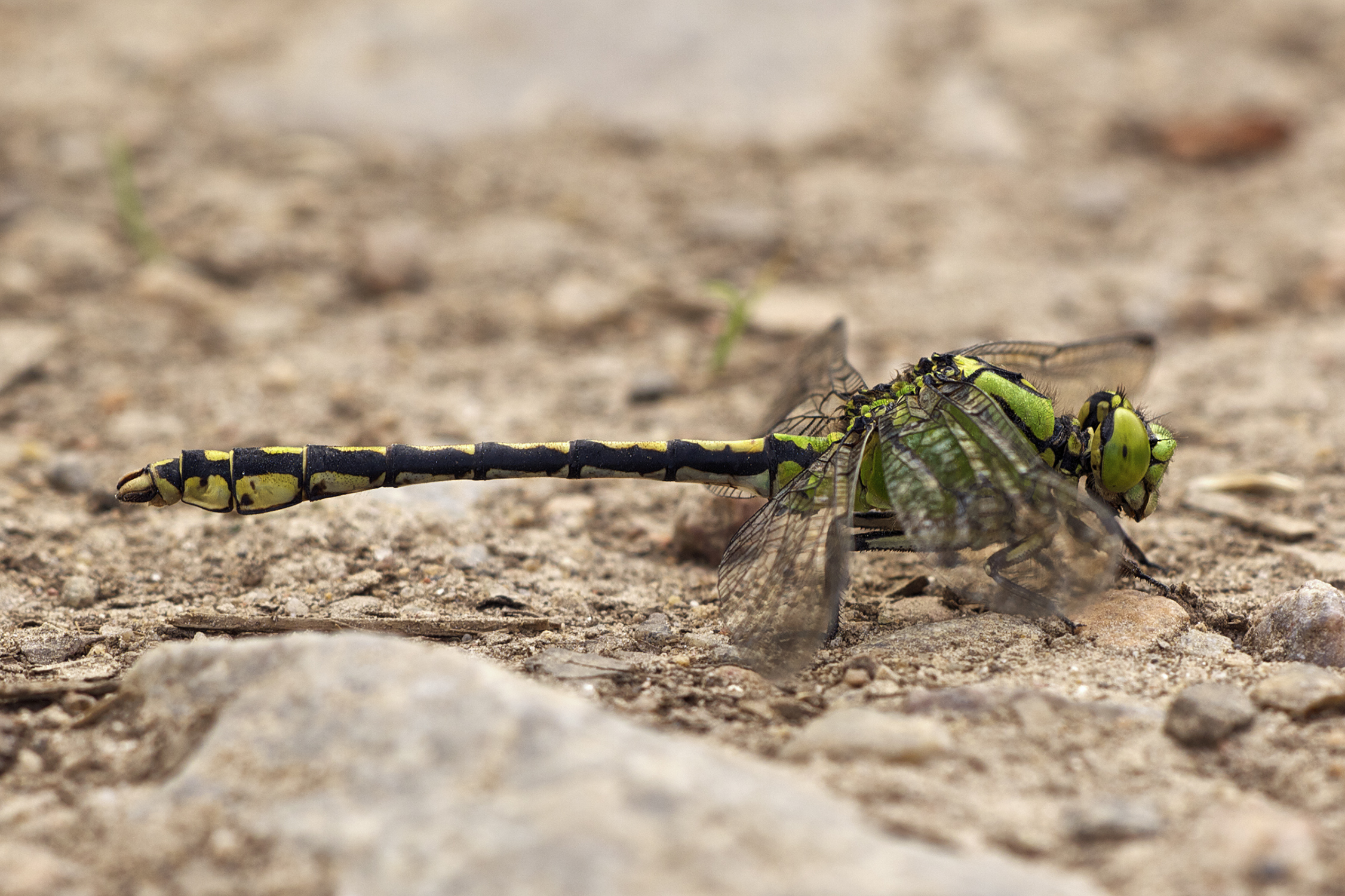
Side view of male

== Description ==
The only snaketail in Europe; resembles a large clubtail in general coloration and river habitat, but the 'front-end' is vivid apple green in mature individuals and the male appendages are short. It is the largest of the Gomphidae apart from Bladetail, with green eyes and 'face, and green thorax with thin black lines on top and side, the latter similar to those on Yellow Clubtail and Western Clubtail; at the base of abdomen the green is extending to S2, the rest of the abdomen has a discontinuous yellow pattern to S 10, generally broader than on clubtails and those on S3-7 more triangular in shape, and moderately clubbed at S8-9. The legs are extensively yellow. Male appendages are short and yellowish. Female yellow markings on the abdomen are broader than on males. It shows two tiny 'crests' on the back of the head, between the eyes. Black lines on the thorax reduced in some individuals. Imatures lack any green.

== Range ==
It is found in Austria, Belarus, Bulgaria, China, the Czech Republic, Denmark, Estonia, Finland, France, Germany, Hungary, Italy, Latvia, Lithuania, Luxembourg, Moldova, North Macedonia, Poland, Portugal, Spain, Romania, Russia, Slovakia, Slovenia, Sweden, Switzerland, Turkey, and Ukraine.

The main distribution area is in Eastern Europe. In Asia Ophiogomphus cecilia reaches Kazakhstan; in the north northern Finland and northern Sweden. There are only a few reports of finds from western and southern Europe. In Germany, it occurs mainly in the eastern parts of the country, including in the Lüneburg Heath, on the Oder, the Spree, in Niederlausitz and in the central and eastern parts of Bavaria.

== Habitat ==
The characteristic habitat of Ophiogomphus cecilia is creeks with a sandy-gravelly bottom, moderate flow speed and shallow water depth, shading in places by trees on the banks, and little pollution. Most of the finds come from rivers and streams. The remaining sites are spread across a wide variety of water types, but none of them play a role as larval habitat.

Of a total of 2,700 exuviae that were collected between 1992 and 1994 in the mouth of the Swabian Rezat, most of them hung on the banks of a five-meter-wide and between 50 and 120 cm deep mill stream with a muddy to sandy bottom. There, Sparganium and / or Potamogeton grew on larger areas. The slowly flowing water (0.2 to 0.4 m / sec.) was shaded by 30% of the adjacent forest. The width of the water does not seem to play a decisive role for the larval development, since the species in Bavaria develops in 1.5 m wide brooks as well as in 50 m wide rivers.

== Ecology ==
In Bavaria, hatching begins in some years as early as the second half of May and lasts well into August. The main flight time is from the end of July to mid-August. Observations are possible until the beginning of October.

Adult males typically inhabit sunny, exposed sitting areas above running water, including stalks, branches protruding over the water, stones, and sandbanks. These areas are often characterized by agitated water flowing over shallow, sandy bottoms. Males defend these sitting areas against others of the same species, though conflicts are typically brief and non-violent. Territorial boundaries are not established, and males may frequent the same stretch of river for several days. They avoid shaded areas. Areas bordered by wooded banks are usually flown around. Even after they have reached maturity, the adults sometimes move far away from their breeding waters.

Males can be detected at distances of up to two kilometres from the inhabited rivers in sun-exposed hillside forests on the edge of a valley. Individuals caught there could be found along the river later. When sexually mature animals were marked, the ratio of males to females was between 16:1 (Rezat) and 67:1 (Aurach). This is to explain the secret behaviour of the females when laying eggs. They usually press the egg balls in the cover of dense vegetation; the eggs are laid in seconds by repeatedly dipping the end of the abdomen into the water. They then immediately disappear from the water. There are also indications that the females also visit the breeding waters separately from the males in terms of space and time.

The larvae can reach relatively high densities. Up to ten larvae per square meter were found on a stream in the northern Upper Palatinate. Larvae hunt both burrowing and on the substrate surface. In addition, hide hunting is known, in which only the front part of the head capsule and the anal pyramid protrude from the substrate. The larval development usually takes three or four, possibly only two years. The hatch occurs close to the water's edge. The gender ratio in the exuvia is balanced. Hatching and flight areas do not necessarily have to be identical; exuvia can also be found in places where adult animals are only sporadically sighted.
