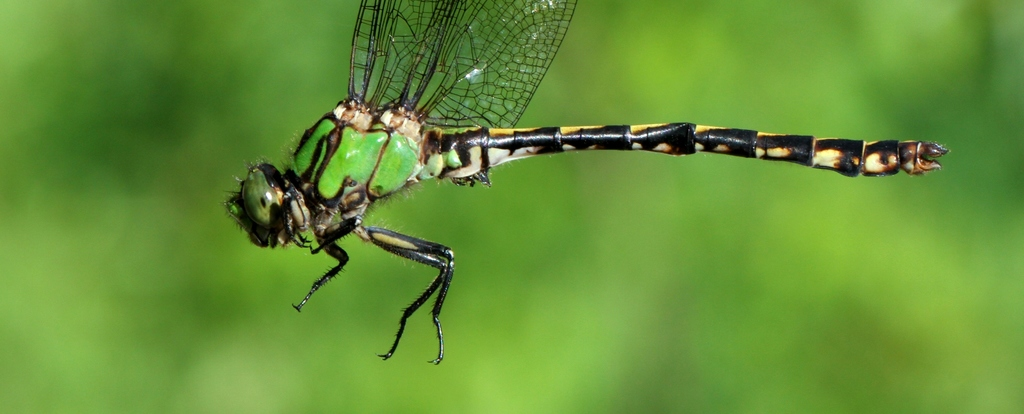

Conservation status
- Least Concern (IUCN 3.1)

Scientific classification
- Kingdom: Animalia
- Phylum: Arthropoda
- Class: Insecta
- Order: Odonata
- Infraorder: Anisoptera
- Family: Gomphidae
- Genus: Ophiogomphus
- Species: O. aspersus

Binomial name
- Ophiogomphus aspersus Morse, 1895

= Ophiogomphus aspersus =

Species of dragonfly

Ophiogomphus aspersus, the brook snaketail, is a species of clubtail in the family of dragonflies known as Gomphidae. It is found in North America.

The IUCN conservation status of Ophiogomphus aspersus is "LC", least concern, with no immediate threat to the species' survival. The population is stable.
