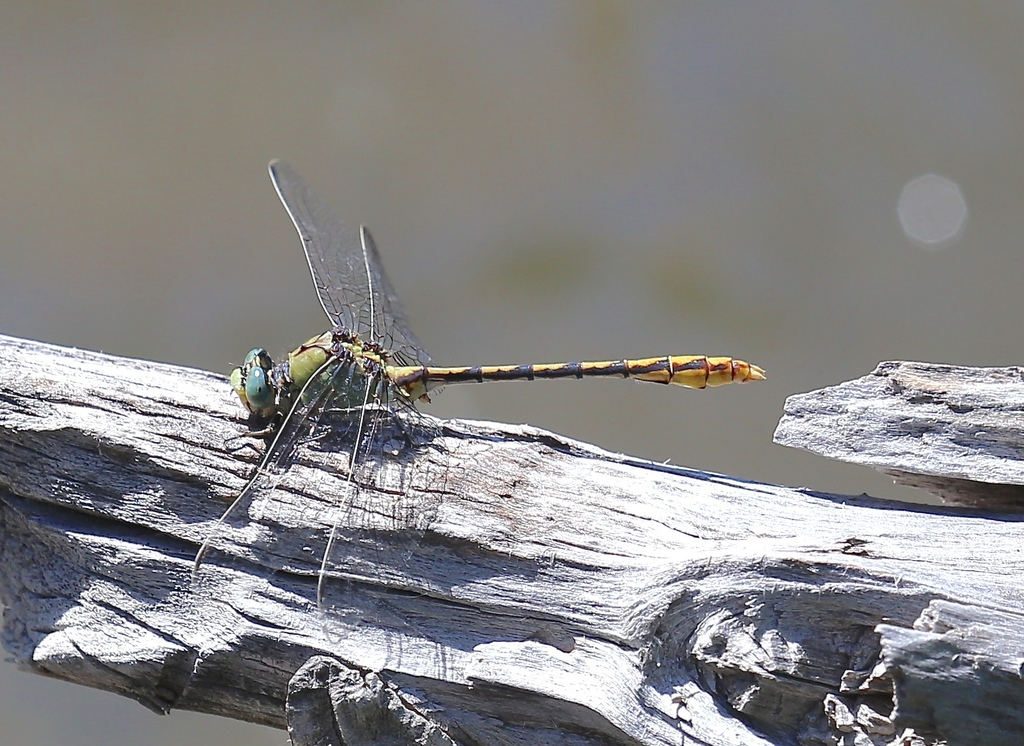

Conservation status
- Least Concern (IUCN 3.1)

Scientific classification
- Domain: Eukaryota
- Kingdom: Animalia
- Phylum: Arthropoda
- Class: Insecta
- Order: Odonata
- Infraorder: Anisoptera
- Family: Gomphidae
- Genus: Ophiogomphus
- Species: O. arizonicus

Binomial name
- Ophiogomphus arizonicus Kennedy, 1917

= Ophiogomphus arizonicus =

Species of dragonfly

Ophiogomphus arizonicus, the Arizona snaketail, is a species of clubtail in the family of dragonflies known as Gomphidae. It is found in North America.

The IUCN conservation status of Ophiogomphus arizonicus is "LC", least concern, with no immediate threat to the species' survival. The population is stable.
