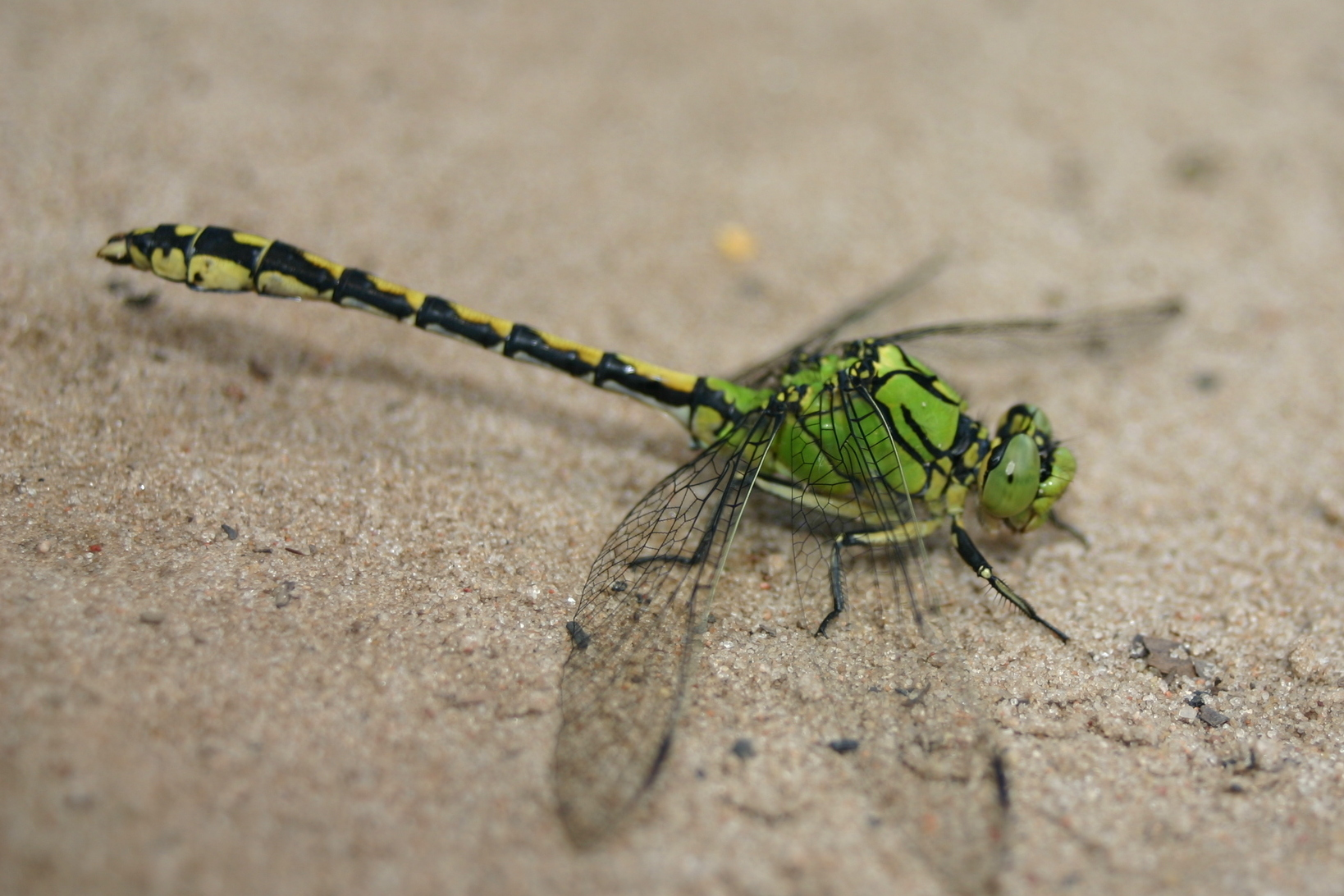
- Ophiogomphus cecilia, Poland

Scientific classification
- Kingdom: Animalia
- Phylum: Arthropoda
- Class: Insecta
- Order: Odonata
- Infraorder: Anisoptera
- Family: Gomphidae
- Genus: Ophiogomphus; Selys, 1854

= Ophiogomphus =

Genus of dragonflies

Ophiogomphus, commonly known as snaketails, is a genus of dragonflies in the family Gomphidae. Most of the species in the genus Ophiogomphus have beautifully marked green club-shaped abdomens, which are more noticeable in the males.

The genus contains the following species:

- Ophiogomphus acuminatus Carle, 1981 – acuminate snaketail
- Ophiogomphus anomalus Harvey, 1898 – extra-striped snaketail
- Ophiogomphus arizonicus Kennedy, 1917 – Arizona snaketail
- Ophiogomphus aspersus Morse, 1895 – brook snaketail
- Ophiogomphus australis Carle, 1992 – southern snaketail
- Ophiogomphus bellicosus Voronocovsky, 1909
- Ophiogomphus bison Selys, 1873 – bison snaketail
- Ophiogomphus carolus Needham, 1897 – riffle snaketail
- Ophiogomphus caudoforcipus Yousuf & Yunus, 1977
- Ophiogomphus cecilia (Geoffroy in Fourcroy, 1785) – green snaketail, green gomphid
- Ophiogomphus cerastis Selys, 1854
- Ophiogomphus colubrinus Selys, 1854 – boreal snaketail
- Ophiogomphus edmundo Needham, 1951 – Edmund's snaketail
- Ophiogomphus howei Bromley, 1924 – pygmy snaketail
- Ophiogomphus incurvatus Carle, 1982 – Appalachian snaketail
- Ophiogomphus mainensis Packard, 1863 – Maine snaketail
- Ophiogomphus morrisoni Selys, 1879 – Great Basin snaketail
- Ophiogomphus obscurus Bartenev, 1909
- Ophiogomphus occidentis (Hagen, 1885) – Sinuous snaketail
- Ophiogomphus purepecha González & Villeda-Callejas, 2000
- Ophiogomphus reductus Calvert, 1898
- Ophiogomphus rupinsulensis (Walsh, 1862) – rusty snaketail
- Ophiogomphus severus Hagen, 1874 – pale snaketail
- Ophiogomphus sinicus (Chao, 1954)
- Ophiogomphus smithi Tennessen & Vogt, 2004 – Sioux snaketail
- Ophiogomphus spinicornis Selys, 1878
- Ophiogomphus susbehcha Vogt & Smith, 1993 – St. Croix snaketail
- Ophiogomphus westfalli Cook & Daigle, 1985 – Westfall's snaketail
