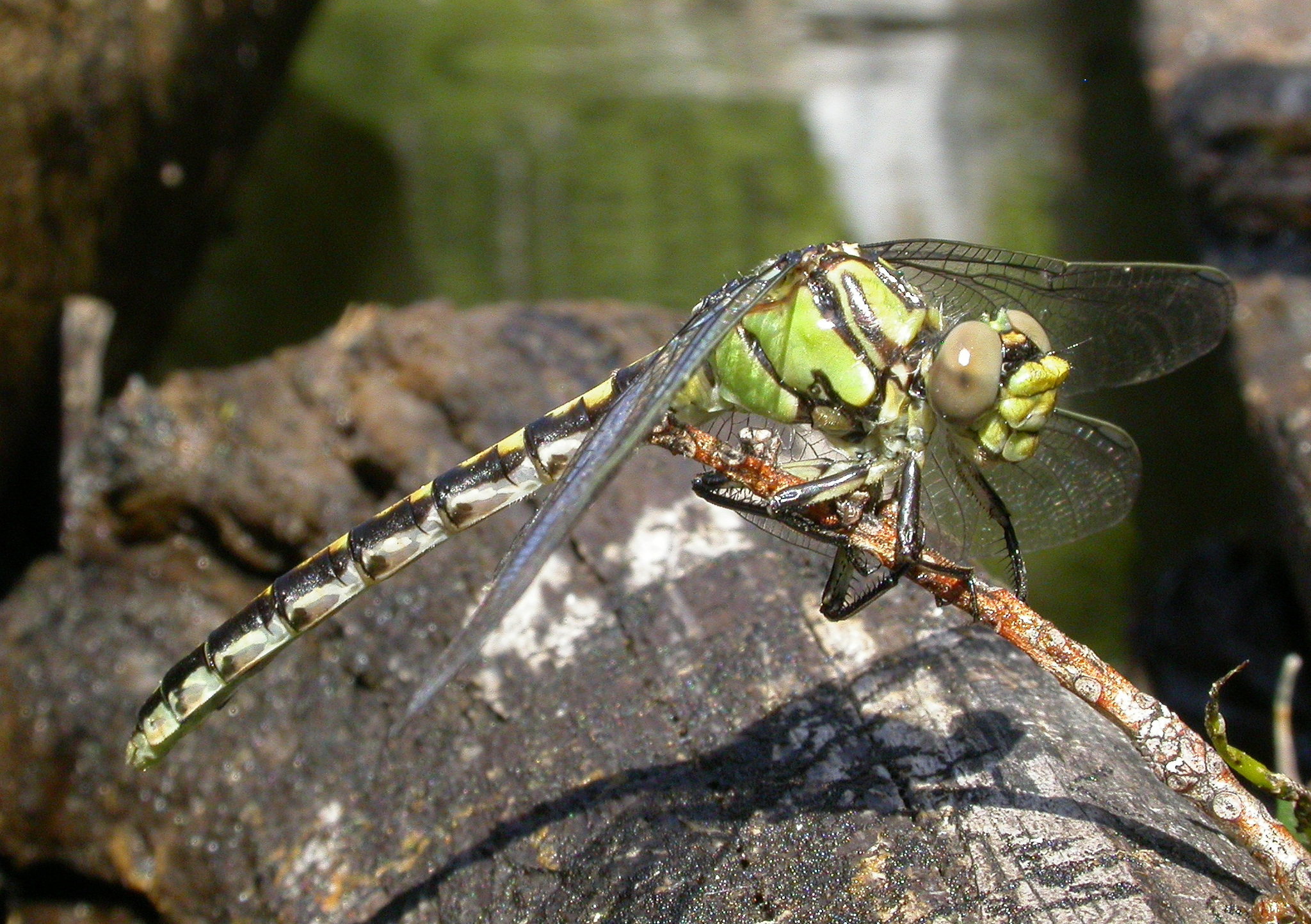

Conservation status
- Least Concern (IUCN 3.1)

Scientific classification
- Kingdom: Animalia
- Phylum: Arthropoda
- Clade: Pancrustacea
- Class: Insecta
- Order: Odonata
- Infraorder: Anisoptera
- Family: Gomphidae
- Genus: Ophiogomphus
- Species: O. morrisoni

Binomial name
- Ophiogomphus morrisoni Selys, 1879

Synonyms
- Ophiogomphus nevadensis (Kennedy, 1917)

= Ophiogomphus morrisoni =

Species of dragonfly

Ophiogomphus morrisoni, the Great Basin snaketail, is a species of clubtail in the family of dragonflies known as Gomphidae. It is found in the western United States, in the states of Oregon, California, and Utah.

The IUCN conservation status of Ophiogomphus morrisoni is "LC", least concern, with no immediate threat to the species' survival. The population is stable.
