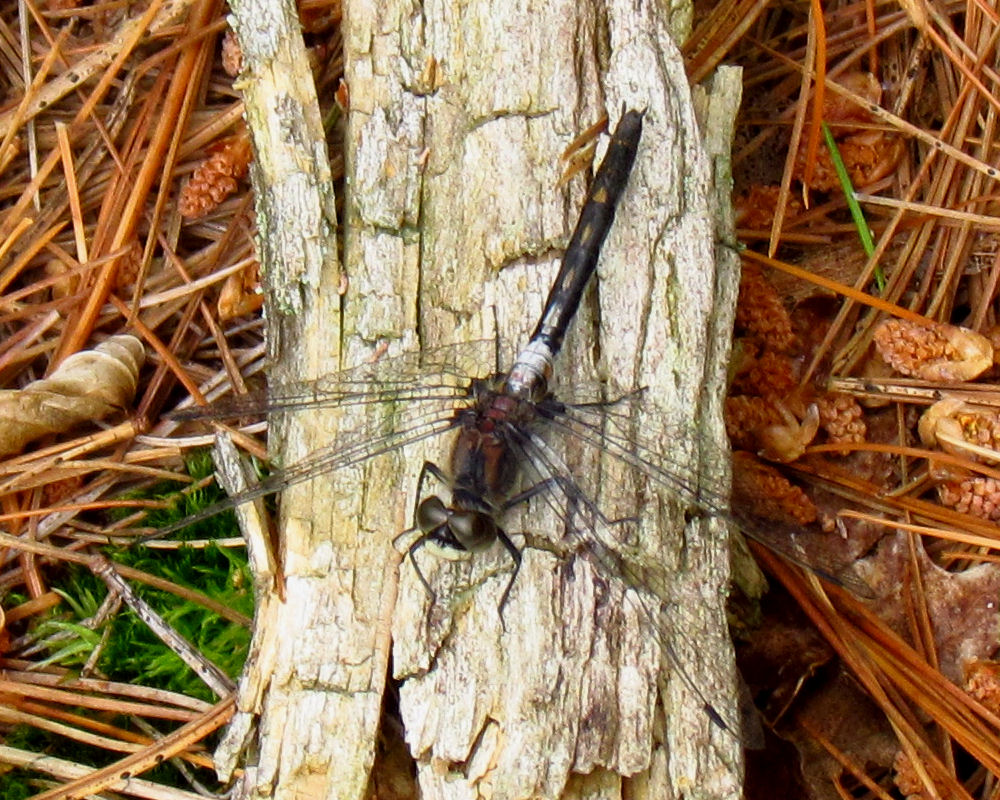
- male, Gatineau Park, Quebec
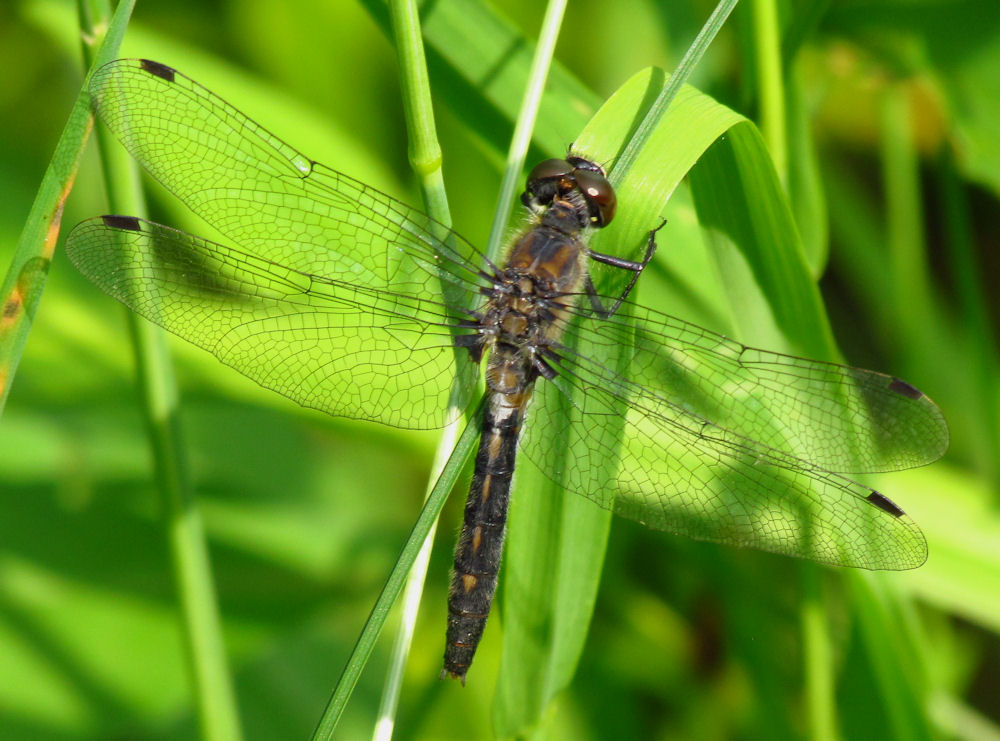
- female, Gatineau Park, Quebec

Scientific classification
- Kingdom: Animalia
- Phylum: Arthropoda
- Class: Insecta
- Order: Odonata
- Infraorder: Anisoptera
- Family: Libellulidae
- Genus: Leucorrhinia
- Species: L. proxima

Binomial name
- Leucorrhinia proxima (Calvert, 1890)

= Leucorrhinia proxima =

Belted whiteface

Species of dragonfly

Leucorrhinia proxima, the belted whiteface or red-waisted whiteface, is a species of dragonfly in the family Libellulidae. It is found across Canada as far north as Alaska and south to northern parts of the United States.
