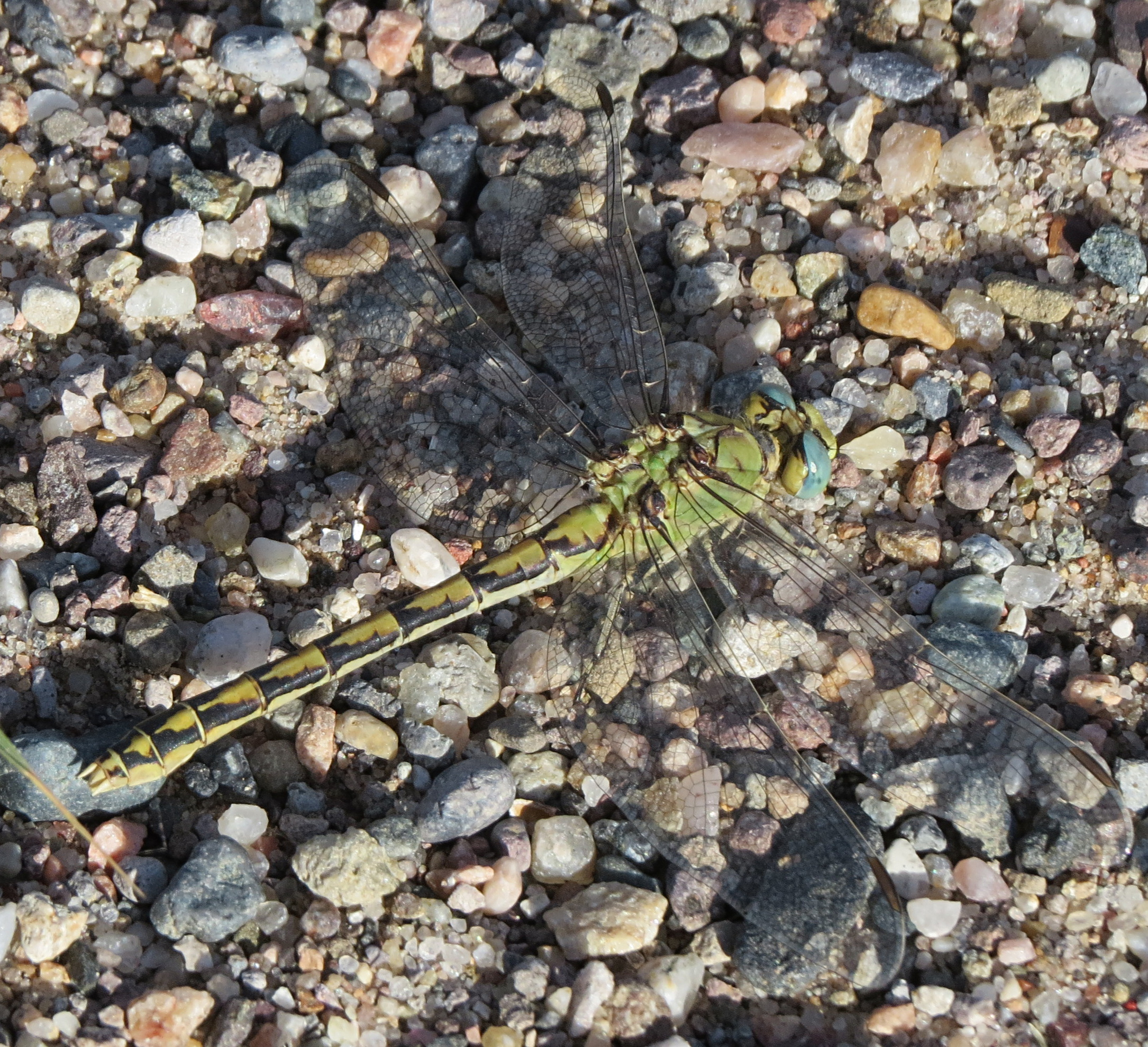
- Male

Scientific classification
- Kingdom: Animalia
- Phylum: Arthropoda
- Clade: Pancrustacea
- Class: Insecta
- Order: Odonata
- Infraorder: Anisoptera
- Family: Gomphidae
- Genus: Ophiogomphus
- Species: O. severus

Binomial name
- Ophiogomphus severus (Hagen, 1874)

= Pale snaketail =

Species of dragonfly

Ophiogomphus severus is a species of dragonfly in the family Gomphidae. It is commonly known as the pale snaketail.

== Subspecies ==
There are two described subspecies of Ophiogomphus severus. The following are the two subspecies:

- Ophiogomphus severus montanus
- Ophiogomphus severus severus
