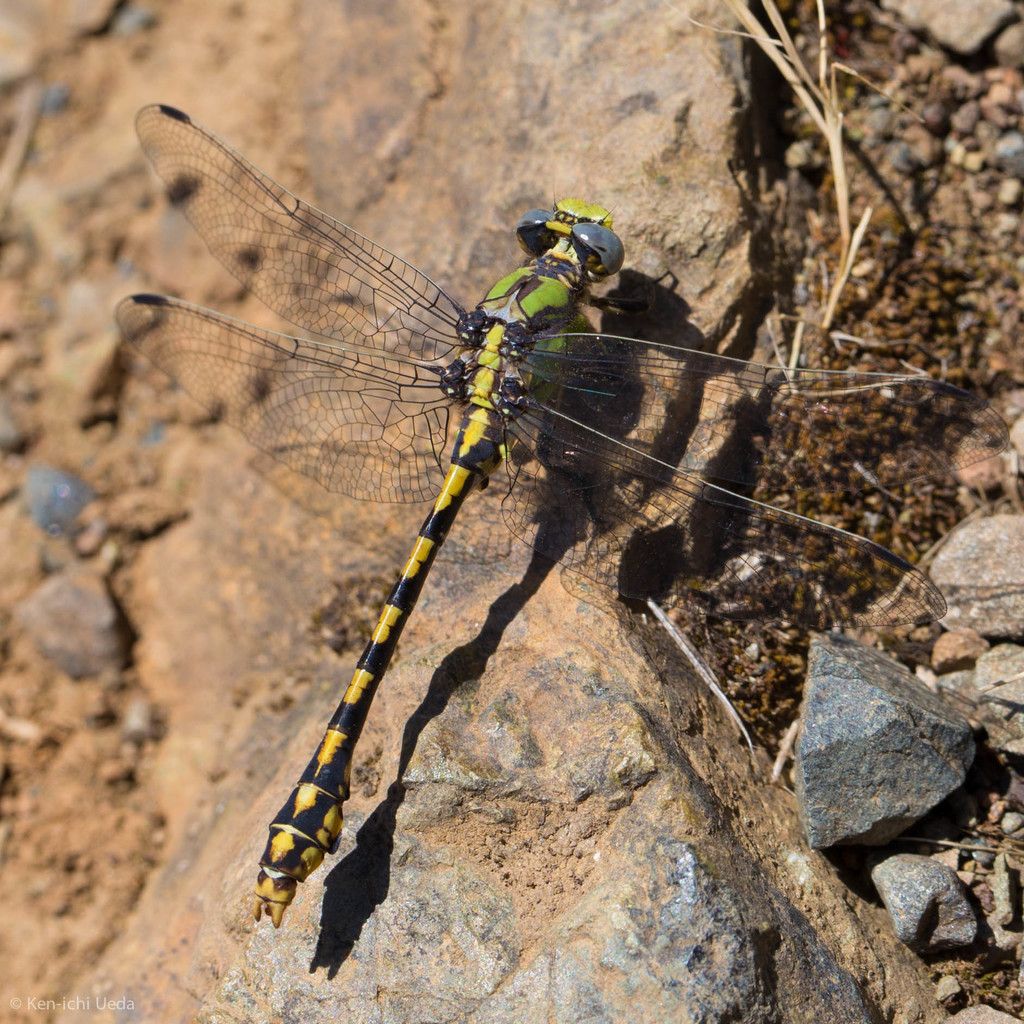

Conservation status
- Least Concern (IUCN 3.1)

Scientific classification
- Domain: Eukaryota
- Kingdom: Animalia
- Phylum: Arthropoda
- Class: Insecta
- Order: Odonata
- Infraorder: Anisoptera
- Family: Gomphidae
- Genus: Ophiogomphus
- Species: O. occidentis

Binomial name
- Ophiogomphus occidentis (Hagen, 1885)

Synonyms
- Ophiogomphus californicus Kennedy, 1917

= Ophiogomphus occidentis =

Species of dragonfly

Ophiogomphus occidentis, the sinuous snaketail, is a species of clubtail in the family of dragonflies known as Gomphidae. It is found in North America.

The IUCN conservation status of Ophiogomphus occidentis is "LC", least concern, with no immediate threat to the species' survival. The population is stable.
