= Aeshna eremita =

- Blue-form (andromorphic) adult female

Scientific classification
- Kingdom: Animalia
- Phylum: Arthropoda
- Clade: Pancrustacea
- Class: Insecta
- Order: Odonata
- Suborder: Anisoptera
- Family: Aeshnidae
- Genus: Aeshna
- Species: A. eremita

Binomial name
- Aeshna eremita Kirby, 1896
- Range of Aeshna eremita

Synonyms
- Aeshna hudsonica Sélys, 1875

Species of dragonfly

Aeshna eremita, the lake darner, is a species of dragonfly in the family Aeshnidae. It is found in Alaska, the Northern United States and across Canada. It is similar in size and markings to the Canada darner, but has a black line across its face.

== Taxonomy ==
=== Discovery and naming ===
Aeshna eremita was first scientifically described in an 1866 paper by American biologist S. H. Scudder published in the Proceedings of the Boston Society of Natural History. The type specimens, fourteen males and two females, were collected in August around a site called Hermit Lake in the White Mountains of New England. Scudder provided a one-page synopsis of the colouration and morphology of both sexes. A holotype male specimen is held in the Museum of Comparative Zoology. The specific name, eremita, means "hermit" or "recluse" in Latin and refers to the site of discovery. The common name, "lake darner", refers to its common habitat of large lakes. All dragonflies of the family Aeshnidae, to which A. eremita belongs, are called "darners" in North America.

=== Identity and synonymy ===
Aeshna crenata, a Euro–Siberian species, was thought by some scientists in the 19th century such as Hermann Hagen (in his 1875 Synopsis of the Odonata of America), to be synonymous with A. eremita, the two actually being one species extending from Labrador to Siberia. Philip Calvert endorsed this view in an 1894 paper titled "On the specific identity of Aeshna clepsydra Say and Ae. crenata Hagen (eremita Scudder)". Calvert considered the synonymy of A. crenata and A. eremita to be an established fact "known since 1875", but after a morphological analysis, he concluded that the two were in fact synonyms of a third, North American, species, Aeshna clepsydra. Comparing a set of features of specimens identified as A. eremita and A. clepsydra, Calvert found: "None of these differences are constant, and they vary independently of each other. I can find no characters that are invariable, and consequently regard the two specimens here tabulated as two extremes of one and the same species." He considered Aeshna clepsydra to the valid name of a species extending from Finland through Siberia to Illinois and Labrador. Edmund Walker was far less enthused. In his 1912 monograph, he wrote: "Calvert ... attempted to show the identity of Ae. eremita Scudd. with Ae. clepsydra Say. This study, ... although a careful piece of work, ... takes no cognizance of the important characters found in the accessory genitalia of the males and the thoracic colour-pattern. A detailed study of all these forms in much larger series leaves no room for doubt as to the specific distinctness of eremita and the comparison of this form with the types of crenata likewise shows that these two forms are also quite distinct."

Aeshna hudsonica, described in 1875 by Belgian scientist Edmond de Sélys Longchamps, is considered a subjective synonym of A. eremita. Sélys published an account in the Entomologist's Monthly Magazine of dragonfly specimens collected in Newfoundland by one John Milne, and described based on five specimens a new species similar to Aeshna juncea which he called Aeshna hudsonica. Edward Bruce Williamson, in a 1906 article on Newfoundland Odonata, dismissed A. hudsonica as "hardly distinct from A. juncea, even as a variety". In 1908, René Martin published the Collections Zoologiques du Baron Edmond de Selys-Longchamps: Catalogue systematique et descriptif in which he provided detailed illustrations of the male anal appendages of A. hudsonica, A. juncea, and A. clepsydra, listing A. eremita and A. crenata both as synonyms of the latter. Martin admitted that A. juncea and A. hudsonica appeared very similar, but listed a number of diagnostic differences in the colouration and the shape of the appendages. In 1910, however, Richard A. Muttkowski synonymized A. hudsonica with A. eremita without detailed explanation. Canadian entomologist Edmund Murton Walker found in his 1912 monograph on North American Aeshna that René Martin's diagrams showed "unmistakably that hudsonica and eremita are synonymous, the latter name having priority."

== Description ==
=== Identification ===
Aeshna eremita is a relatively large dragonfly often be found flying continuously over larger lakes. In much of its range it is the largest species of darner present, measuring up to eight centimetres long. Both the males and females have relatively large cerci and a black line across the face. The colour of the thorax in males are generally blue, sometimes shading to green below; the females may have andromorphic (male-like) colouration, or be yellow-green in colour. Lake darners also characteristically lack pale spots on the undersides of their abdomen, unlike the similar-looking Canada darner and green-striped darner. Although the subarctic darner and the sedge darner also have a dark line across the face and broadly similar colouration, they can clearly distinguished from A. eremita by the very different shape of the thoracic stripes.

Table of identifying features distinguishing A. eremita and similar species
Character	Features	Aeshna eremita		Aeshna canadensis		Aeshna verticalis	
Thoracic stripes	First (frontmost) lateral thoracic stripe with a deep notch on the leading edge; posterior spur (flag) at the top of the first stripe very small and separated from the stripe. In A. canadensis, the notch is slightly shallower; the flag is small but connected. In A. verticalis, shallow notch and very broad, prominent flag. Finally, in A. eremita the rearmost stripe has a small notch on the leading edge, whereas in both A. canadensis and A. verticalis it is relatively straight.						
Cerci (male)	View	Dorsal	Lateral	Dorsal	Lateral	Dorsal	Lateral
Cerci (male)	Large, paddle-like cerci, inner margins smoothly curved, tips very rounded and usually without a terminal spine. Tips relatively straight as opposed to curved downwards. In A. canadensis, tips steeply curved downwards and in A. verticalis gently so. A. canadensis has textured bumps on the upper surface of the cerci.						

== Distribution and habitat ==
Aeshna eremita has a broad distribution in mainland North America, through most of Canada and parts of the United States. It extends from Alaska to Newfoundland through the boreal forests. It is found in most of Alaska except the far north, throughout the Yukon and most of the Northwest Territories, including above the Arctic Circle, being observed as far north as Paulatuk (69°21′ N) and Herschel Island (69°35′ N). In Nunavut, there is one mid-20th century record from Arviat. It is found throughout the province of British Columbia, including on Vancouver Island.

In British Columbia and the Yukon, the lake darner is a commonly observed species in mountain valleys around lightly vegetated to wooded water bodies, as well as around fens and grassy or sedge-lined ponds. Conversely, studies of dragonflies in the Birch Mountains and Caribou Mountains parks in boreal northern Alberta described A. eremita as a species which dominates large, "deep lakes with little vegetation".

== Behaviour ==
On cold but sunny days, Aeshna eremita has been observed to rest from flying sitting in a horizontal position on logs. This practice is rare and unusual, as Aeshnid dragonflies usually hang in a vertical position, unlike members of other families (such as Gomphids and Libellulids), which are usually horizontal perchers.

== Bibliography ==
- Cannings, Robert A.; Klymko, John; Catling, Paul M.; Savard, Michel; Lemelin, Guy; Jones, Colin D.; Cannings, Sydney G.; Savard, Rémi-Julien (12 February 2024). "The Dragonflies and Damselflies (Insecta: Odonata) of Canada: species list, geographical distribution, status, and conservation ranks". Zootaxa. 5410 (1): 1–48. doi:10.11646/zootaxa.5410.1.1. ISSN 1175-5334. PMID 38480259.
- Cannings, Sydney G.; Cannings, Robert A. (1997). "Dragonflies (Odonata) of the Yukon" (PDF). In Danks, H. V.; Downes, J. A. (eds.). Insects of the Yukon. Ottawa: Biological Survey of Canada (Terrestrial Arthropods).
- Paulson, Dennis (2009). Dragonflies and Damselflies of the West. Princeton Field Guides. Princeton University Press. pp. 214–5. ISBN 978-0-691-12281-6.
- Paulson, Dennis (2011). Dragonflies and Damselflies of the East. Princeton Field Guides. Princeton University Press. pp. 188–93. ISBN 978-0-691-12283-0.
- Walker, Edmund Murton (1912). The North American dragonflies of the genus Aeshna (PDF). University of Toronto Biological Series No. 11. University of Toronto Press. pp. 119–29.
- Walker, Edmund Murton (1958). The Odonata of Canada and Alaska. Vol. 2, Part III: The Anisoptera—Four Families. University of Toronto Press. ISBN 0-8020-7076-0
