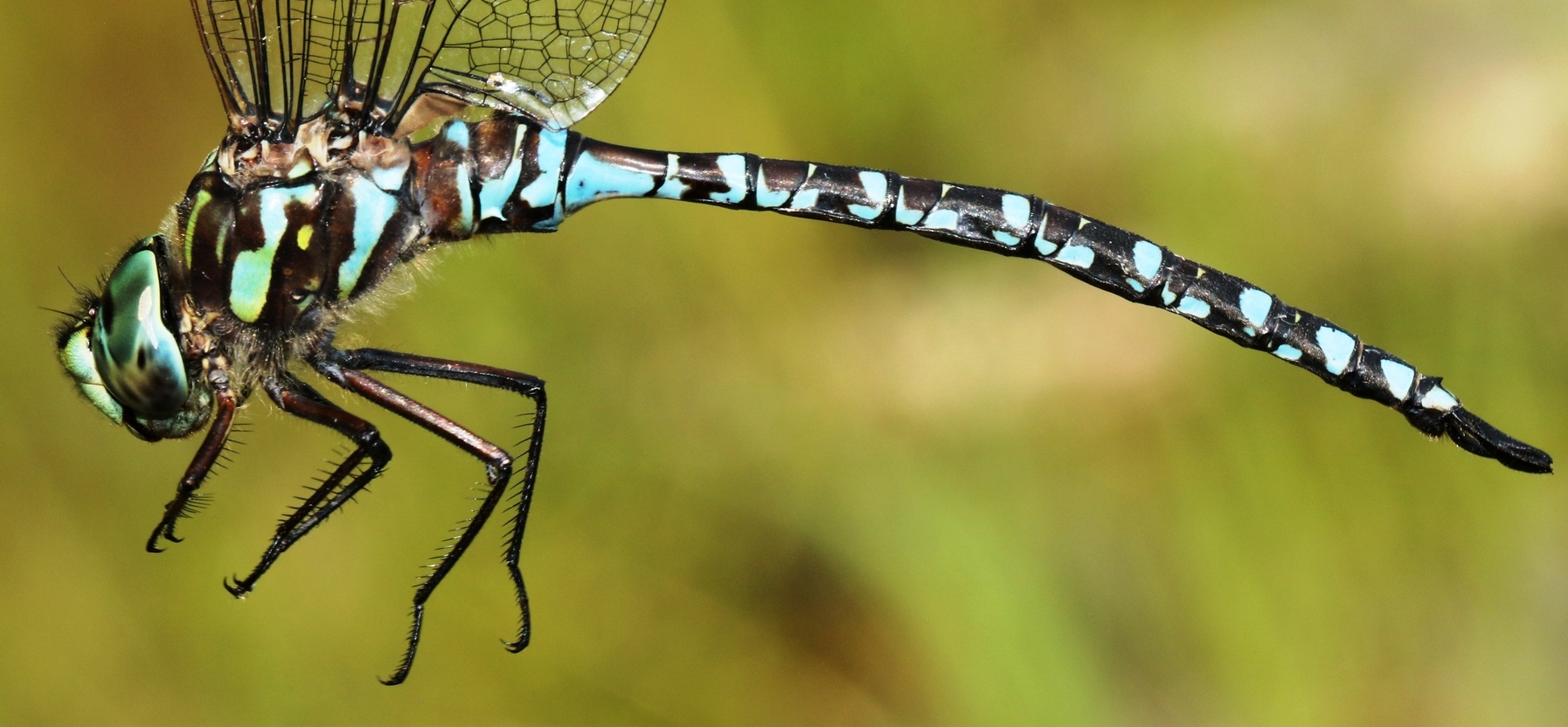

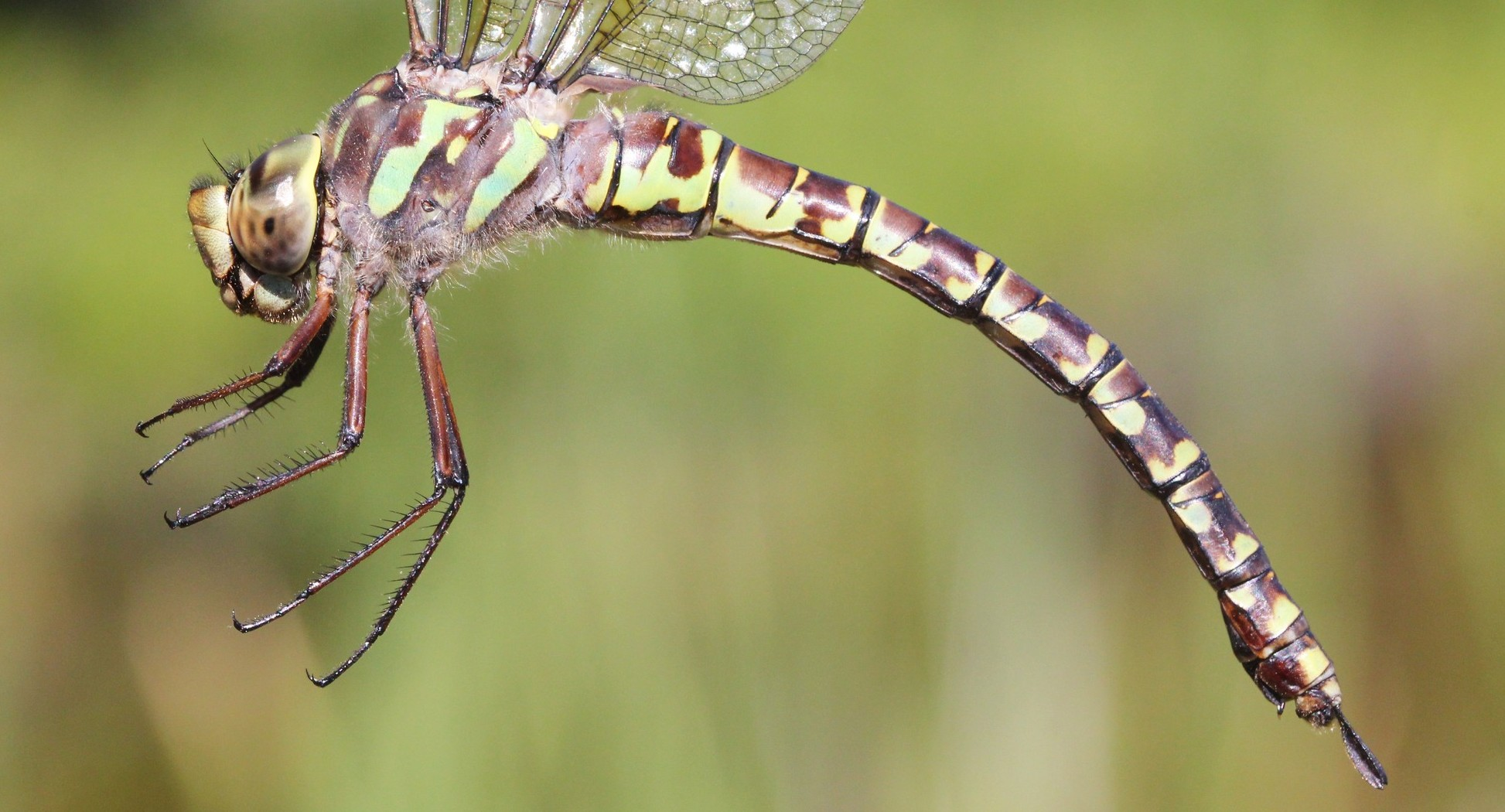
- Male (top) and female (bottom)

Conservation status
- Least Concern (IUCN 3.1)

Scientific classification
- Kingdom: Animalia
- Phylum: Arthropoda
- Clade: Pancrustacea
- Class: Insecta
- Order: Odonata
- Infraorder: Anisoptera
- Family: Aeshnidae
- Genus: Aeshna
- Species: A. canadensis

Binomial name
- Aeshna canadensis Walker, 1908
- Range of Aeshna canadensis

= Aeshna canadensis =

Canada darner

Species of dragonfly

Aeshna canadensis, the Canada darner, is a species of dragonfly in the family Aeshnidae. It is common throughout southern Canada and the northern United States.

== Description ==
Adult Canada darners, similar to other members of the genus Aeshna, are relatively large, slender dragonflies, and are predominantly dark brown with paler blue or green markings. Adults are 64 to 73 mm in total length. The thorax has two vertical stripes on each side, the front with a prominent notch and an extension at the top. The abdomen has spots on most segments. The pale markings are usually blue in males and range from yellow-green to blue in females. The eyes are bluish in males and yellowish or bluish in females. The pale markings may turn gray at colder temperatures.

The green-striped darner is very similar, but is distinguished by minor differences in the shape of the markings and in typically having green thorax stripes. The lake darner is also similar but is larger and has a distinct dark stripe across the face.

== Taxonomy ==
The Canada darner was first scientifically described in 1908 by Canadian entomologist Edmund Murton Walker, in the same publication as the first descriptions of black-tipped darner, shadow darner, subarctic darner, and variable darner.

== Distribution ==
Canada darners are found from Newfoundland and New Jersey in the east to Yukon in the west. Populations extend further south down the Appalachian Mountains to West Virginia and south in mountain ranges to California and Montana. There is an isolated population in Nebraska.

== Life history ==
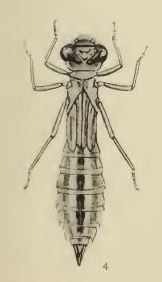
nymph

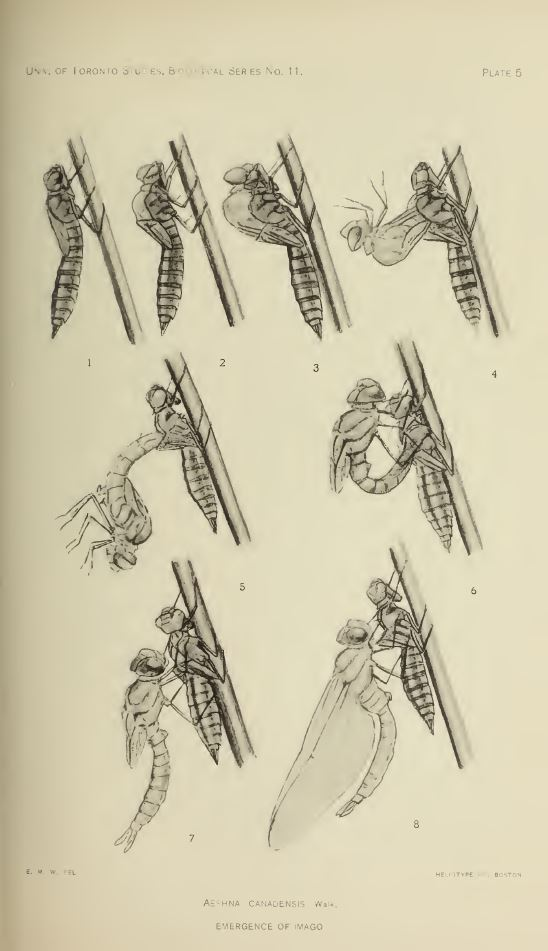
illustration of emergence from larval exuvia

Canada darners spend most of their lives as an aquatic nymph. Larvae are typically found in lakes and ponds, especially bog ponds and beaver ponds. Breeding ponds typically have abundant emergent vegetation. An Ontario study found that the species was restricted to ponds with a pH of no more than 6.2. One study found that larvae may spend either one or two winters underwater before emerging.

Adult males fly slowly along the shores of breeding ponds, sometimes dropping to the surface to search for females. Mating occurs in shrubs nearby. Females lay eggs at water level, usually in marshy vegetation away from shore. Breeding adults are most active in sunny weather.

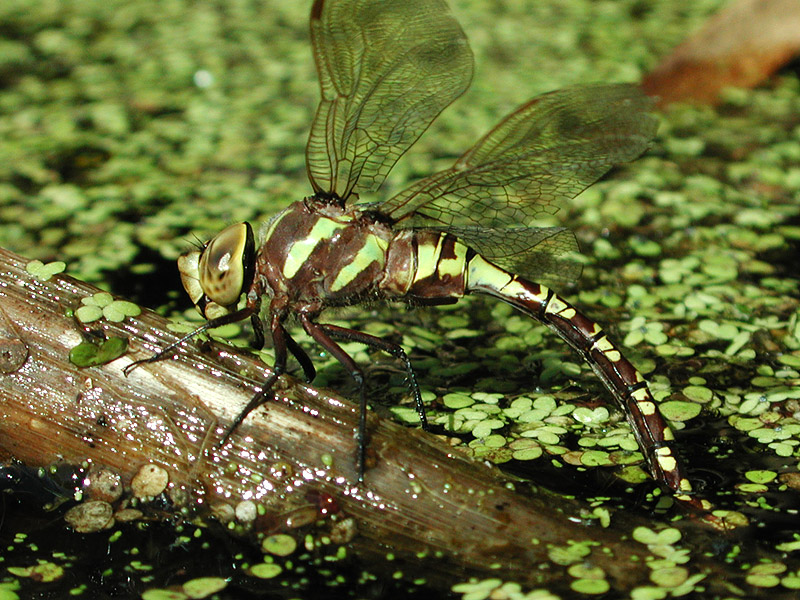
female laying eggs

Away from breeding sites, adult Canada darners are often found with other darner species in feeding swarms in clearings and along roadways in early evening. Adult Canada darners may be seen from June to October.

Canada darners are often considered to be a common to abundant species where they are found. Although the species has not generally been recognised as migratory, a study in Manitoba and Minnesota found that at least some populations of Canada darners undertake north-south migratory movements within their range.
