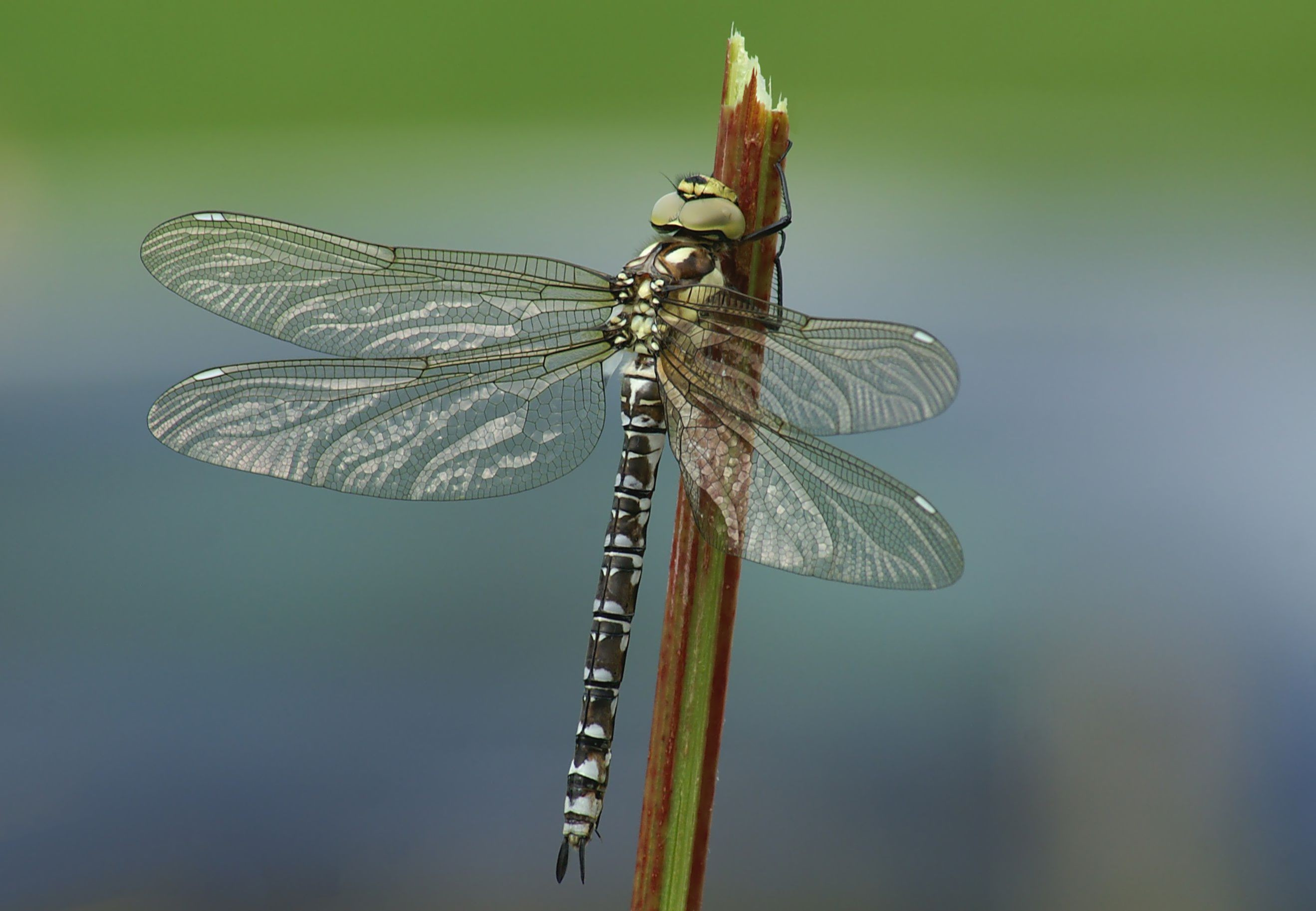
- Southern hawker (Aeshna cyanea)

Scientific classification
- Kingdom: Animalia
- Phylum: Arthropoda
- Clade: Pancrustacea
- Class: Insecta
- Order: Odonata
- Infraorder: Anisoptera
- Family: Aeshnidae
- Subfamily: Aeshninae
- Genus: Aeshna; Fabricius, 1775

Species
- See text

= Aeshna =

Aeshna Temporal range: Late Eocene to present

Genus of dragonflies

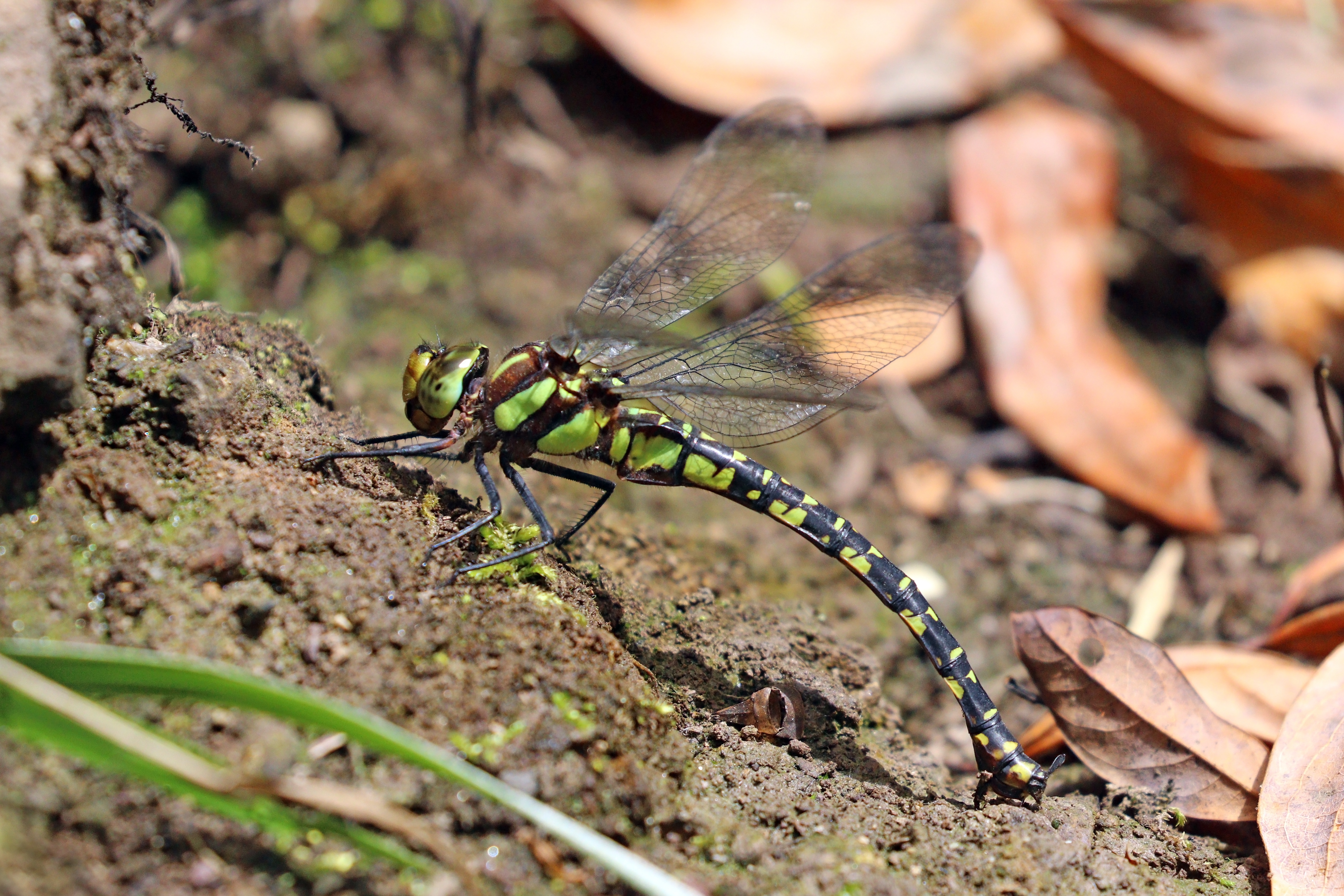
A. petalura female laying eggs Phulchowki, Nepal

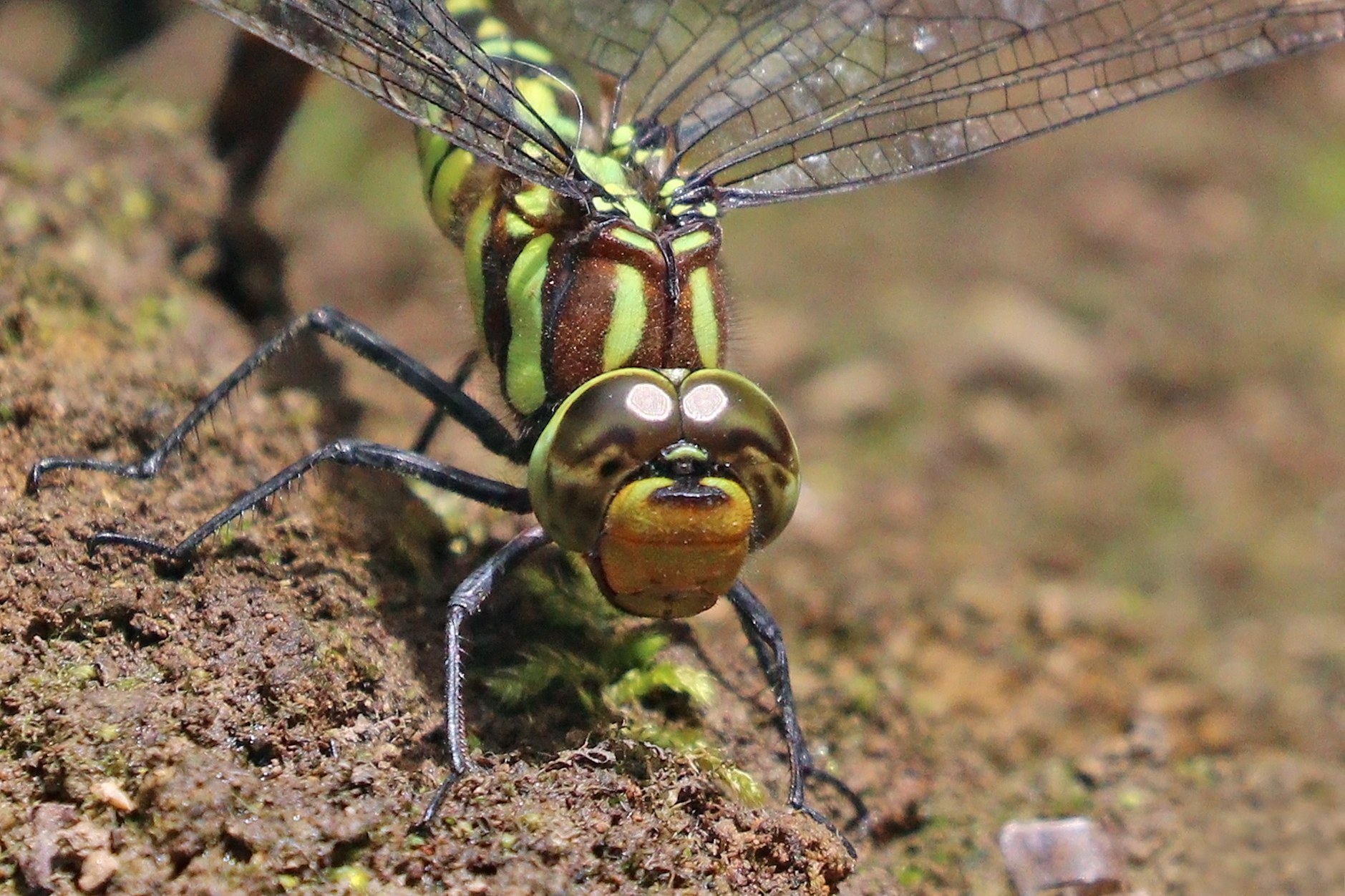
A. petalura female laying eggs Phulchowki, Nepal

Aeshna, the hawkers or mosaic darners, is a genus of dragonflies in the family Aeshnidae. Species within this genus are generally known as "hawkers" in the Old World, or "darners" in the New World.

== Description ==
These are relatively large dragonflies; the European species measure 59–83 mm body length. Their thoraces and abdomens are brown, with blue, green, or yellow stripes or spots on the thorax, and yellow, blue, or green spots on the abdomen; the size and shape of these spots is important in identification of the different species.

A study in 2003 demonstrated that the Holarctic and Neotropical species placed in this genus formed two clades that did not share a common ancestor, and proposed the latter be transferred to a separate genus Rhionaeschna.

The name Aeshna was coined by the Danish entomologist Fabricius in 1775, with the type species being the brown hawker Aeshna grandis. The name may have resulted from a printer's error in spelling the Greek Aechma, "a spear". The spelling "Aeschna" has been used intermittently, but was rejected by the ICZN in 1911 as an unjustified emendation of the original name Aeshna. However, derived genus names (such as Rhionaeschna) retain the 'sch' spelling, as this is how they were first cited.

== Species ==
Many species formerly included in Aeshna have been split into other genera, including Afroaeschna, Andaeschna, Isoaeschna, Pinheyschna, Rhionaeschna, and Zosteraeschna. The former Aeshna isoceles is also split out, as Isoaeschna isoceles.

The genus Aeshna includes these species:

- Aeshna affinis Van der Linden, 1820 – southern migrant hawker, blue-eyed hawker
- Aeshna annulata Fabricius, 1798 (Doubtful Species)
- Aeshna athalia Needham, 1930
- Aeshna caerulea (Ström, 1783) – azure hawker
- Aeshna canadensis Walker, 1908 – Canada darner
- Aeshna clepsydra Say, 1839 – mottled darner
- Aeshna constricta Say, 1839 – lance-tipped darner
- Aeshna crenata Hagen, 1856 – Siberian hawker
- Aeshna cyanea (Müller, 1764) – blue hawker, southern hawker
- Aeshna eremita Scudder, 1866 – lake darner
- Aeshna frontalis Navás, 1936
- Aeshna grandis (Linnaeus, 1758) – brown hawker
- Aeshna interrupta Walker, 1908 – variable darner
- Aeshna juncea (Linnaeus, 1758) – common hawker, sedge darner, moorland hawker
- Aeshna mixta Latreille, 1805 – migrant hawker
- Aeshna palmata Hagen, 1856 – paddle-tailed darner
- Aeshna persephone Donnelly, 1961 – Persephone's darner
- Aeshna petalura Martin, 1909
- Aeshna septentrionalis Burmeister, 1839 – azure darner
- Aeshna serrata Hagen, 1856 – Baltic hawker
- Aeshna shennong Zhang & Cai, 2014
- Aeshna sitchensis Hagen, 1861 – zigzag darner
- Aeshna soneharai Asahina, 1988
- Aeshna subarctica Walker, 1908 – bog hawker, subarctic darner
- Aeshna tuberculifera Walker, 1908 – black-tipped darner
- Aeshna umbrosa Walker, 1908 – shadow darner
- Aeshna vercanica Schneider, Schneider, Schneider, Verstraete & Dumont, 2015
- Aeshna verticalis Hagen, 1861 – green-striped darner
- Aeshna viridis Eversmann, 1836 – green hawker
- Aeshna walkeri Kennedy, 1917 – Walker's darner
- Aeshna williamsoniana Calvert, 1905 – Williamson's darner

=== Fossil species ===
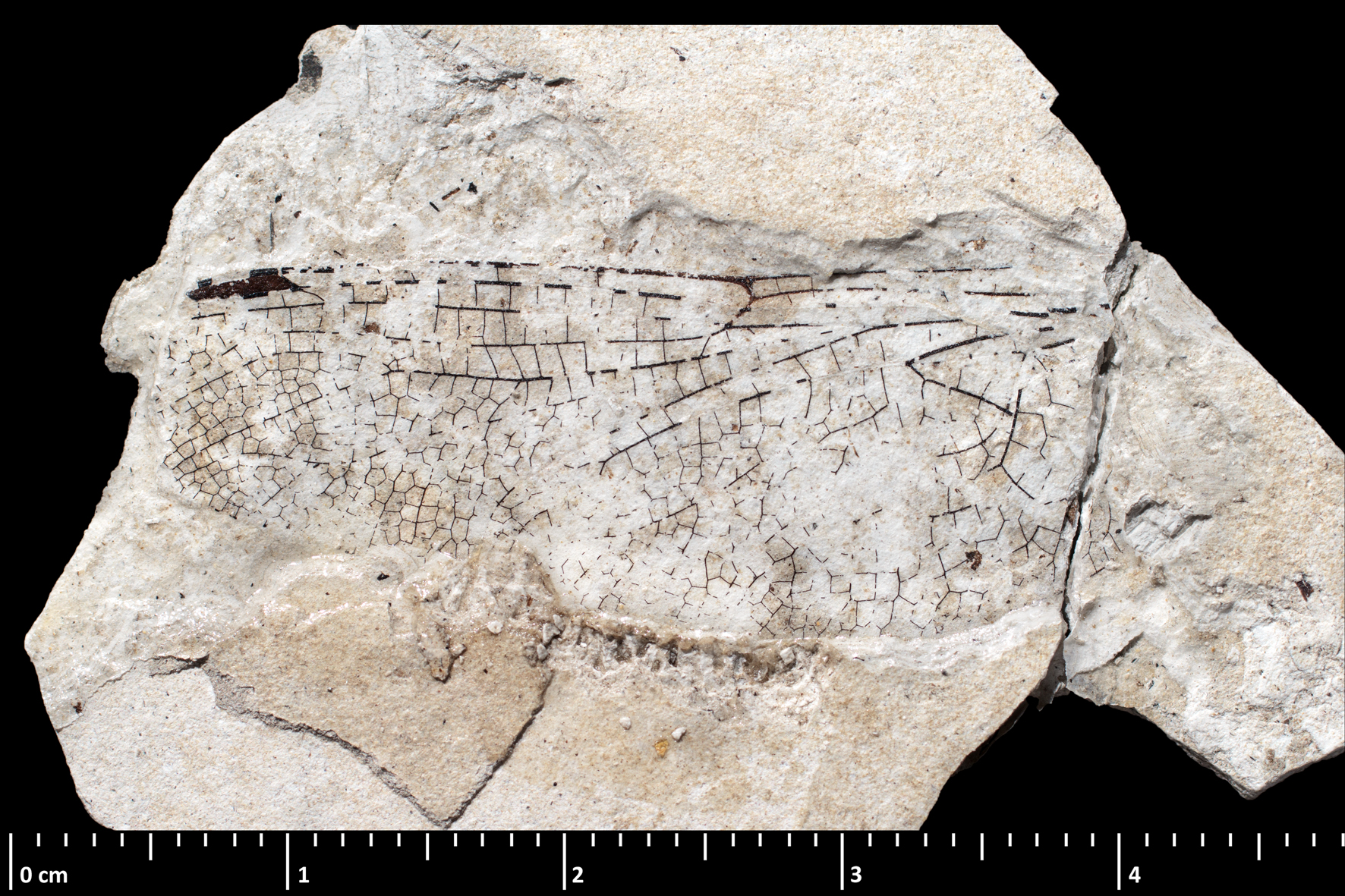
Aeshna andancensis holotype wing

Note that many fossil species in the genus were named at a time when many extant species now included in other genera were included in Aeshna. The list of valid fossil species is based on Nel et al. (2022), with species of uncertain validity noted:

- †Aeshna andancensis Nel & Brisac, 1994 – Late Miocene (Turolian), France
- †Aeshna caseneuvensis Nel et al., 2022 – earliest Oligocene (Rupelian) of France
- †Aeshna cerdanica Nel & Martínez-Delclòs, 1994 – Late Miocene (Vallesian), Spain
- ?†Aeshna dido Hagen, 1863 (Aeshnidae incertae sedis) – Late Oligocene, Rott Formation, Germany
- †Aeshna forficatum Li et al., 2011 – Middle Miocene, Shanwang Formation, China
- †Aeshna ghiandonii Gentilini & Peters, 1993 – Late Miocene (Messinian), Gessoso Formation, Italy
- ?†Aeshna heterofasciata Théobald, 1937 (Anisoptera incertae sedis) – Early Oligocene, Salt Formation, Germany
- †Aeshna ignivora Zhang, 1989 – Middle Miocene, Shanwang Formation, China
- ?†Aeshna larvata Scudder, 1890 (Anisoptera incertae sedis) – Late Eocene (Priabonian), Florissant Formation, Colorado
- †Aeshna messiniana Gentilini & Peters, 1993 – Late Miocene (Messinian), Gessoso Formation, Italy
- †Aeshna multicellulata Gentilini & Peters, 1993 – Late Miocene (Messinian), Gessoso Formation, Italy
- †Aeshna oligocenica Nel, 1994 – terminal Oligocene, Niveau du gypse d'Aix Formation, France
- †Aeshna ollivieri Nel, 1986 – Late Oligocene, Campagne-Calavon Formation, France
- ?†Aeshna paleocyanea Nel, 1987 (Aeshnidae incertae sedis) – Early Oligocene (Stampian), France
- †Aeshna shanwangensis Li et al., 2011 – Middle Miocene, Shanwang Formation, China
- †Aeshna solida Scudder, 1890 – Late Eocene (Priabonian), Florissant Formation, Colorado
- †Aeshna stavropolensis Nel et al., 2005 – Middle Miocene of North Caucasus, Russia
- ?†Aeshna theobaldi Piton, 1934 (Aeshnidae incertae sedis) – Early Pleistocene (Villafranchian), France
- ?†Aeshna tyche Heer, 1849 (Aeshnidae incertae sedis) – Late Miocene (Sarmatian), Upper Freshwater-Molasse Formation, Germany
- †Aeshna voesendorfensis Papp & Mandl, 1951 – Late Miocene (Messinian), Austria
- †Aeshna zlatkokvaceki Prokop et al., 2016 – Early Miocene of the Czech Republic
