= Green-striped darner =

Green-striped darner may refer to:

- Aeshna verticalis, a species of dragonfly native to North America
- Dromaeschna forcipata, a species of dragonfly, native to northern Australia
