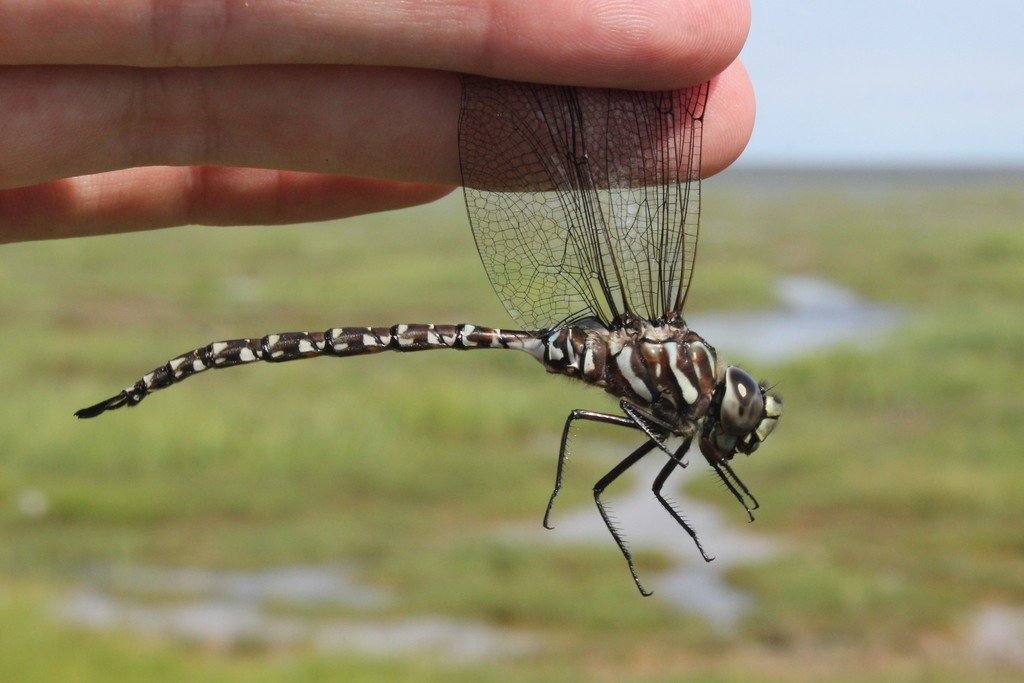

Conservation status
- Least Concern (IUCN 3.1)

Scientific classification
- Kingdom: Animalia
- Phylum: Arthropoda
- Clade: Pancrustacea
- Class: Insecta
- Order: Odonata
- Infraorder: Anisoptera
- Family: Aeshnidae
- Genus: Aeshna
- Species: A. subarctica

Binomial name
- Aeshna subarctica Walker, 1908

= Aeshna subarctica =

Species of dragonfly

Aeshna subarctica, the subarctic darner or bog hawker, is a species of dragonfly belonging to the family Aeshnidae, the darners and hawkers. This holarctic dragonfly is found in Europe and Northern Asia (excluding China) and North America.

== Taxonomy ==
Aeshna subarctica was first formally described in 1908 by the Canadian entomologist Edmund Murton Walker with its type locality given as Nipigon, Ontario. This species is classified in the genus Aeshna in the family Aeshnidae, the hawkers, in the order Odonata, the dragonflies and damselflies.

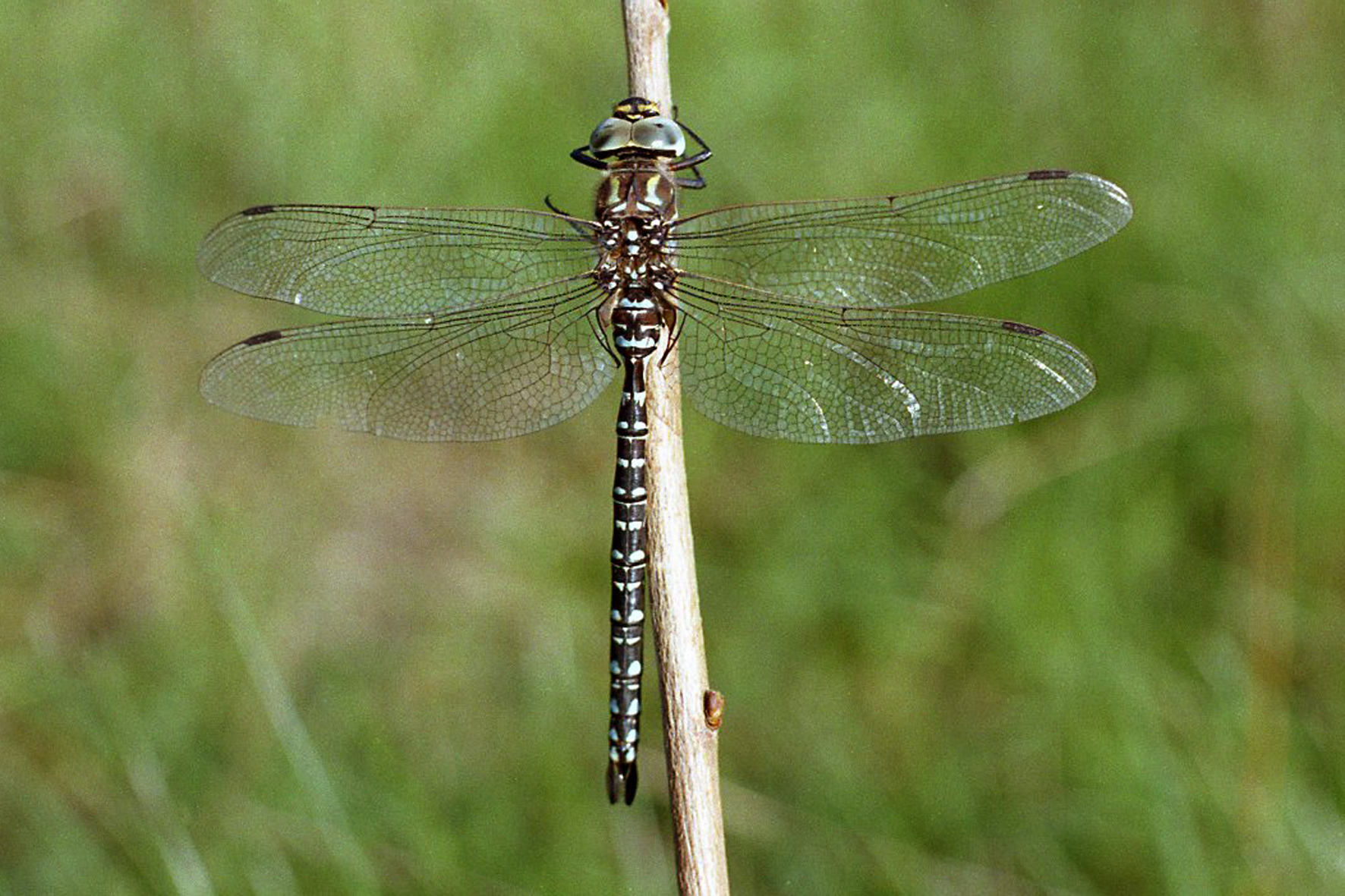
Subarctic darner, Aeshna subarctica

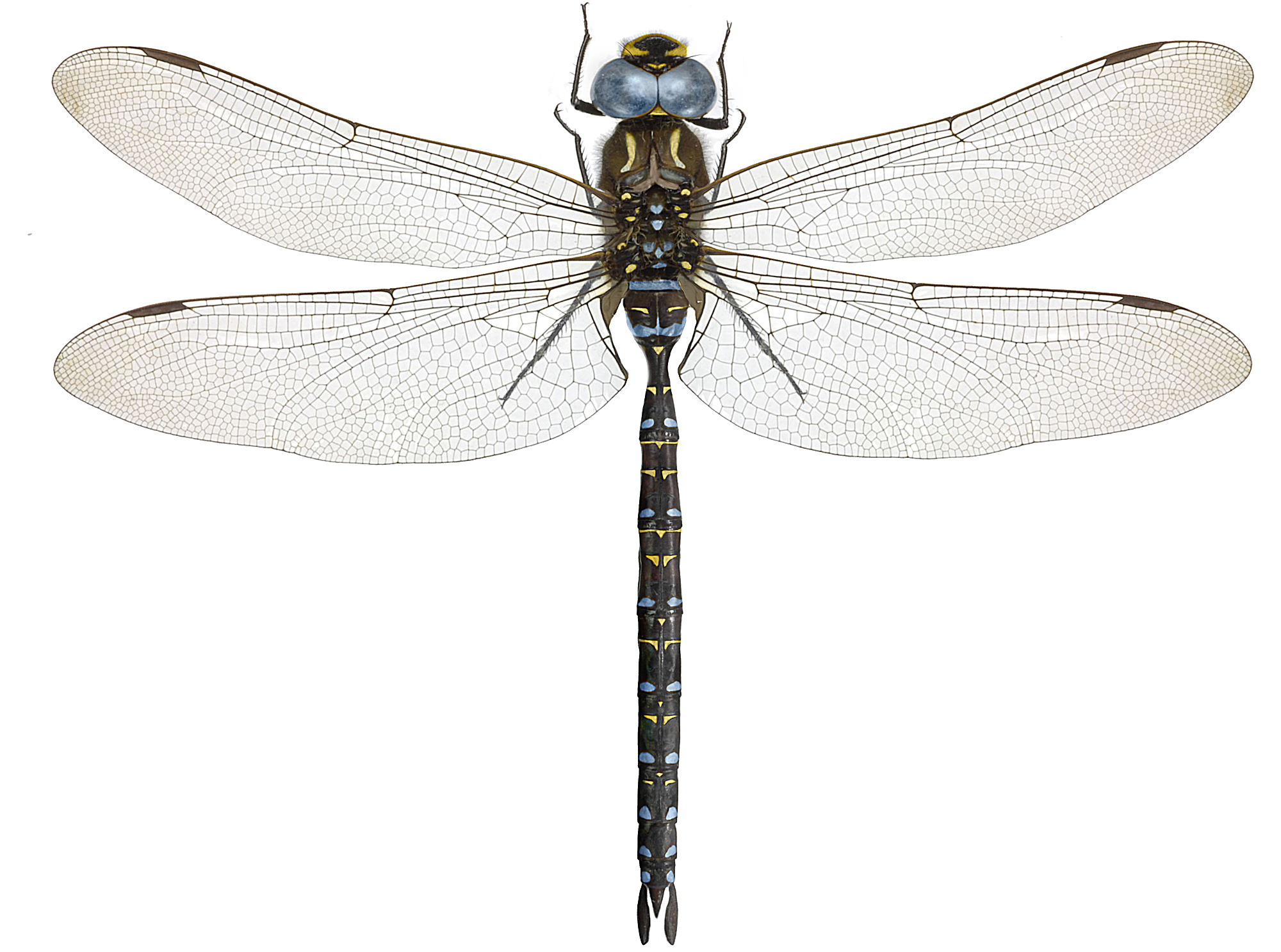
Subarctic darner, Aeshna subarctica

=== Subspecies ===
Aeshna subarctica is further classified into two subspecies:

- Aeshna subarctica elisabethae Djakonov, 1922 - northern Europe and Asia
- Aeshna subarctica subarctica Walker, 1908 - Northern North America

== Distribution and habitat ==
Aeshna subarctica has a holarctic distribution with the nominate subspecies being found in Alaska, Canada south as far as Oregon, Montana, Wisconsin and New Jersey. The Eurasian subspecies is found in the northern parts of Europe and Asia from most of Fennoscandia to the Bering Strait, as well as the Baltic states, Poland, northern Germany, Denmark and the Netherlands. To the south of the main range this species can befound in the higher mountains of Europe, although this species is difficult to separate from the sympatric common hawker (A. juncaea) which may cause under-recording. In Europe bog hawkers have been discovered as far south as the Italian Alps and Romanian Carpathians. The bog hawker is restricted to acidic moors and Sphagnum peat bogs where there are naturally flooded depressions or peat diggings. This species prefers habitats where there is some floating sphagnum moss, a habitat called "sphagnum soup", used by the larvae. It is a lowland species in the north of but is restricted to mountains, mostly at altitudes greater than 700 m (2,300 ft) in the south.
