= Aeshna williamsoniana =

Williamson's darner

Conservation status
- Data Deficient (IUCN 3.1)

Scientific classification
- Kingdom: Animalia
- Phylum: Arthropoda
- Class: Insecta
- Order: Odonata
- Infraorder: Anisoptera
- Family: Aeshnidae
- Genus: Aeshna
- Species: A. williamsoniana

Binomial name
- Aeshna williamsoniana Calvert, 1905

Species of dragonfly

Aeshna williamsoniana, Williamson's darner, is a species of dragonfly in the family Aeshnidae. It is found in Belize, Costa Rica, Guatemala, Mexico, Panama, and possibly Honduras. Its natural habitats are subtropical or tropical moist montane forests and rivers. It is threatened by habitat loss.
