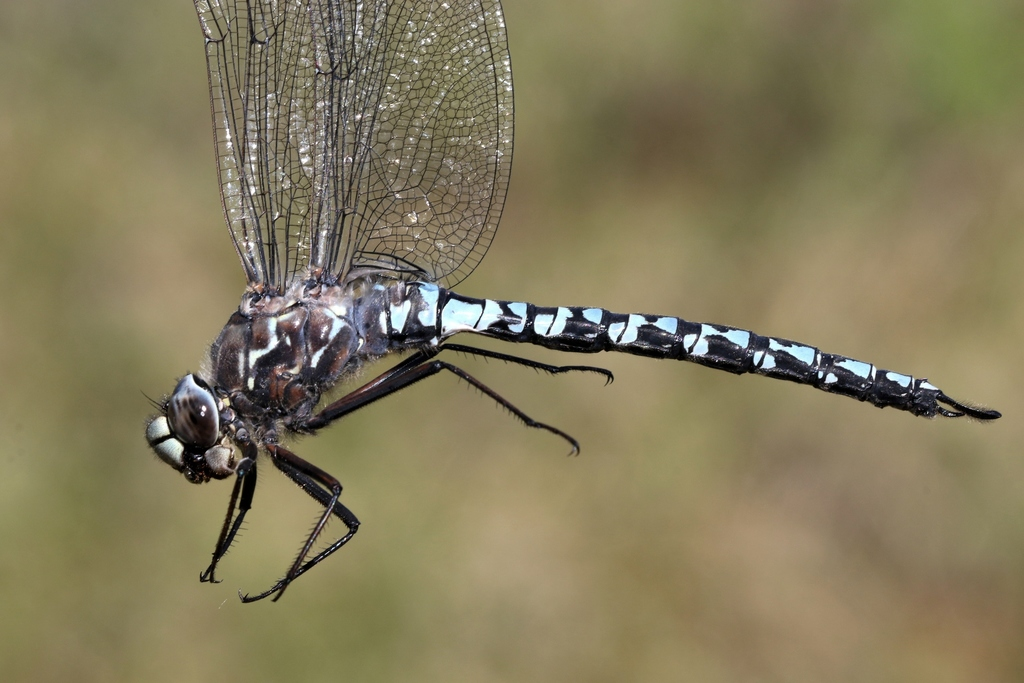

Conservation status
- Least Concern (IUCN 3.1)

Scientific classification
- Kingdom: Animalia
- Phylum: Arthropoda
- Class: Insecta
- Order: Odonata
- Infraorder: Anisoptera
- Family: Aeshnidae
- Genus: Aeshna
- Species: A. septentrionalis

Binomial name
- Aeshna septentrionalis Burmeister, 1839

= Aeshna septentrionalis =

Species of dragonfly

Aeshna septentrionalis, the azure darner, is a species of darner in the dragonfly family Aeshnidae. It is found in North America.

The IUCN conservation status of Aeshna septentrionalis is "LC", least concern, with no immediate threat to the species' survival. The IUCN status was reviewed in 2017.
