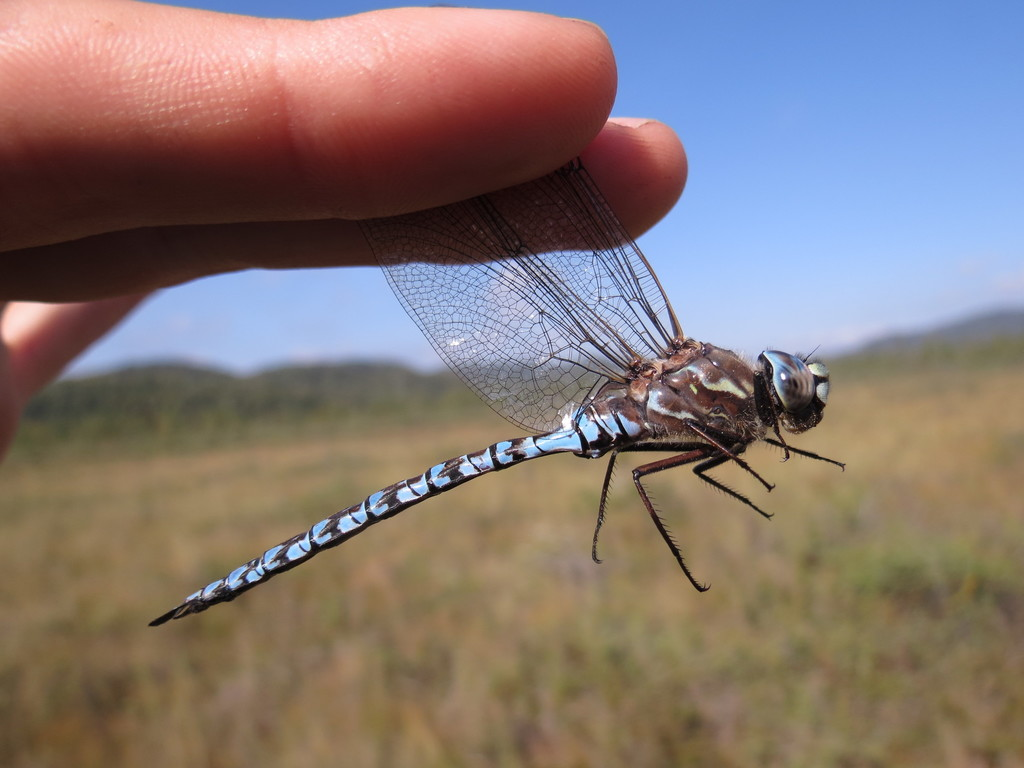
- male

Conservation status
- Least Concern (IUCN 3.1)

Scientific classification
- Kingdom: Animalia
- Phylum: Arthropoda
- Class: Insecta
- Order: Odonata
- Infraorder: Anisoptera
- Family: Aeshnidae
- Genus: Aeshna
- Species: A. sitchensis

Binomial name
- Aeshna sitchensis Hagen, 1861

= Aeshna sitchensis =

Species of dragonfly

Aeshna sitchensis, the zigzag darner, is a species of darner in the dragonfly family Aeshnidae. It is found in North America.

The IUCN conservation status of Aeshna sitchensis is "LC", least concern, with no immediate threat to the species' survival. The population is stable. The IUCN status was reviewed in 2017.

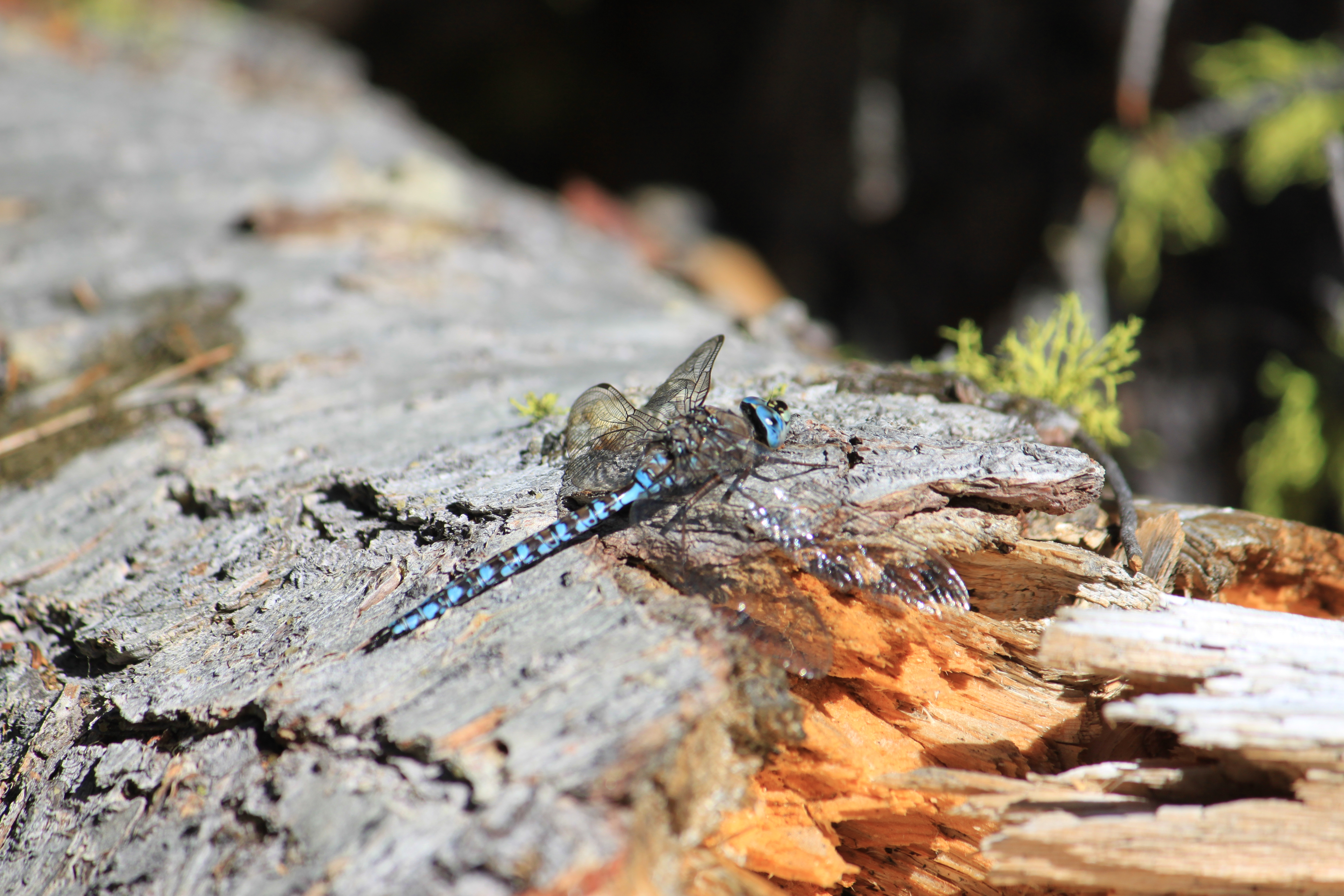
Perched flat on log

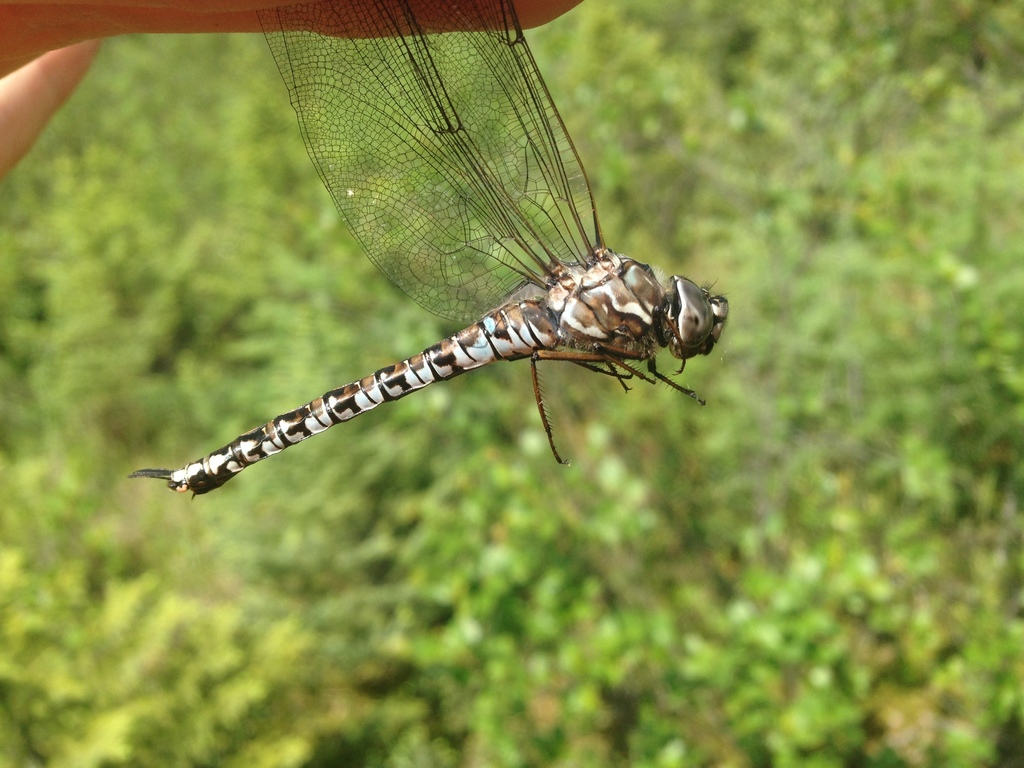
Female
- Media related to Aeshna sitchensis at Wikimedia Commons
