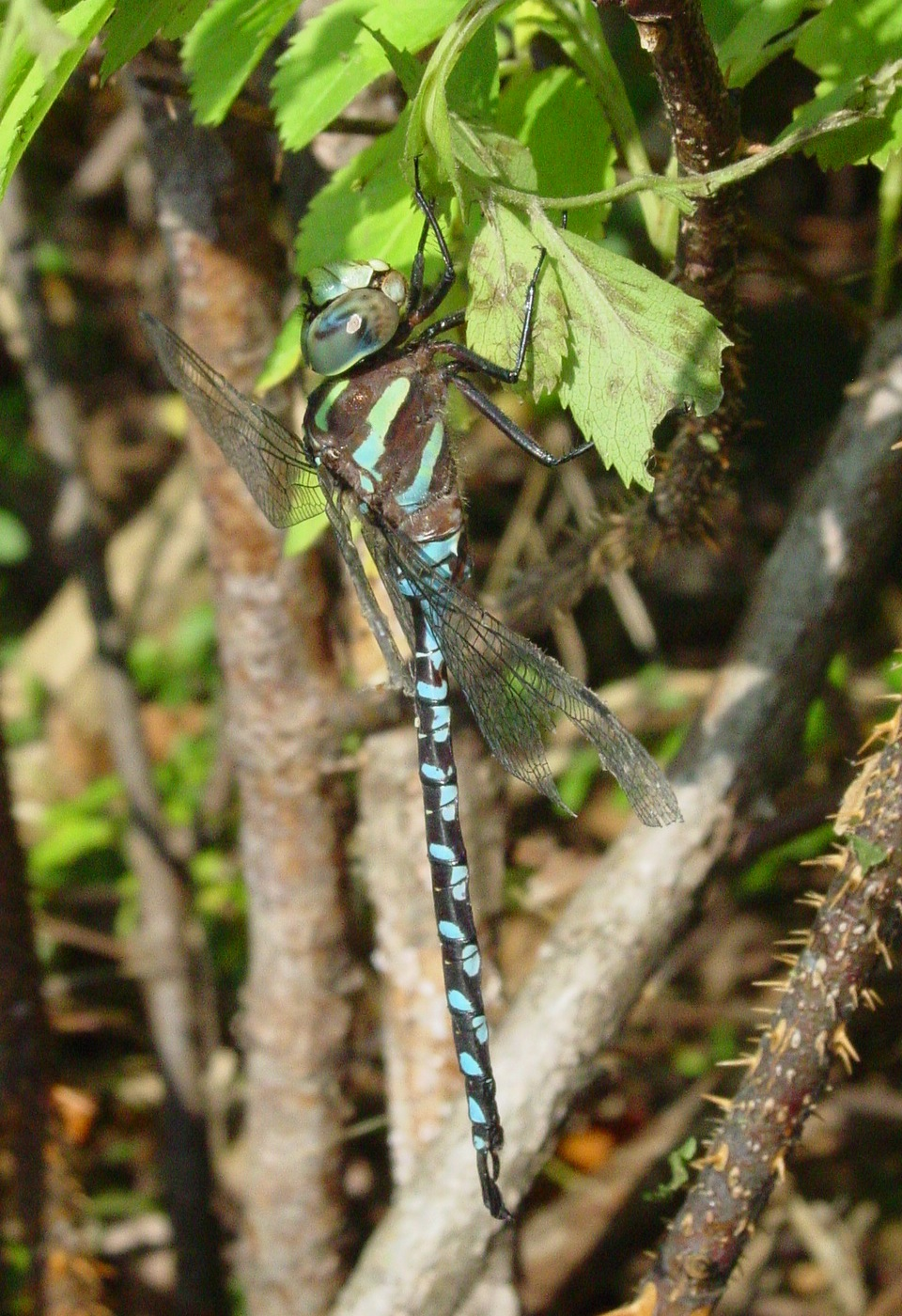

Conservation status
- Least Concern (IUCN 3.1)

Scientific classification
- Kingdom: Animalia
- Phylum: Arthropoda
- Class: Insecta
- Order: Odonata
- Infraorder: Anisoptera
- Family: Aeshnidae
- Genus: Aeshna
- Species: A. constricta

Binomial name
- Aeshna constricta Say, 1840
- Range of Aeshna constricta

= Aeshna constricta =

Species of dragonfly

Aeshna constricta, the lance-tipped darner, is a species of darner in the dragonfly family Aeshnidae. It is found in North America.

The IUCN conservation status of Aeshna constricta is "LC", least concern, with no immediate threat to the species' survival. The population is stable. The IUCN status was reviewed in 2017.
