= Aeshna athalia =

Scientific classification
- Domain: Eukaryota
- Kingdom: Animalia
- Phylum: Arthropoda
- Class: Insecta
- Order: Odonata
- Infraorder: Anisoptera
- Family: Aeshnidae
- Genus: Aeshna
- Species: A. athalia

Binomial name
- Aeshna athalia Needham 1930

Species of dragonfly

Aeshna athalia is a species of dragonfly in the genus Aeshna. It is found in China.
