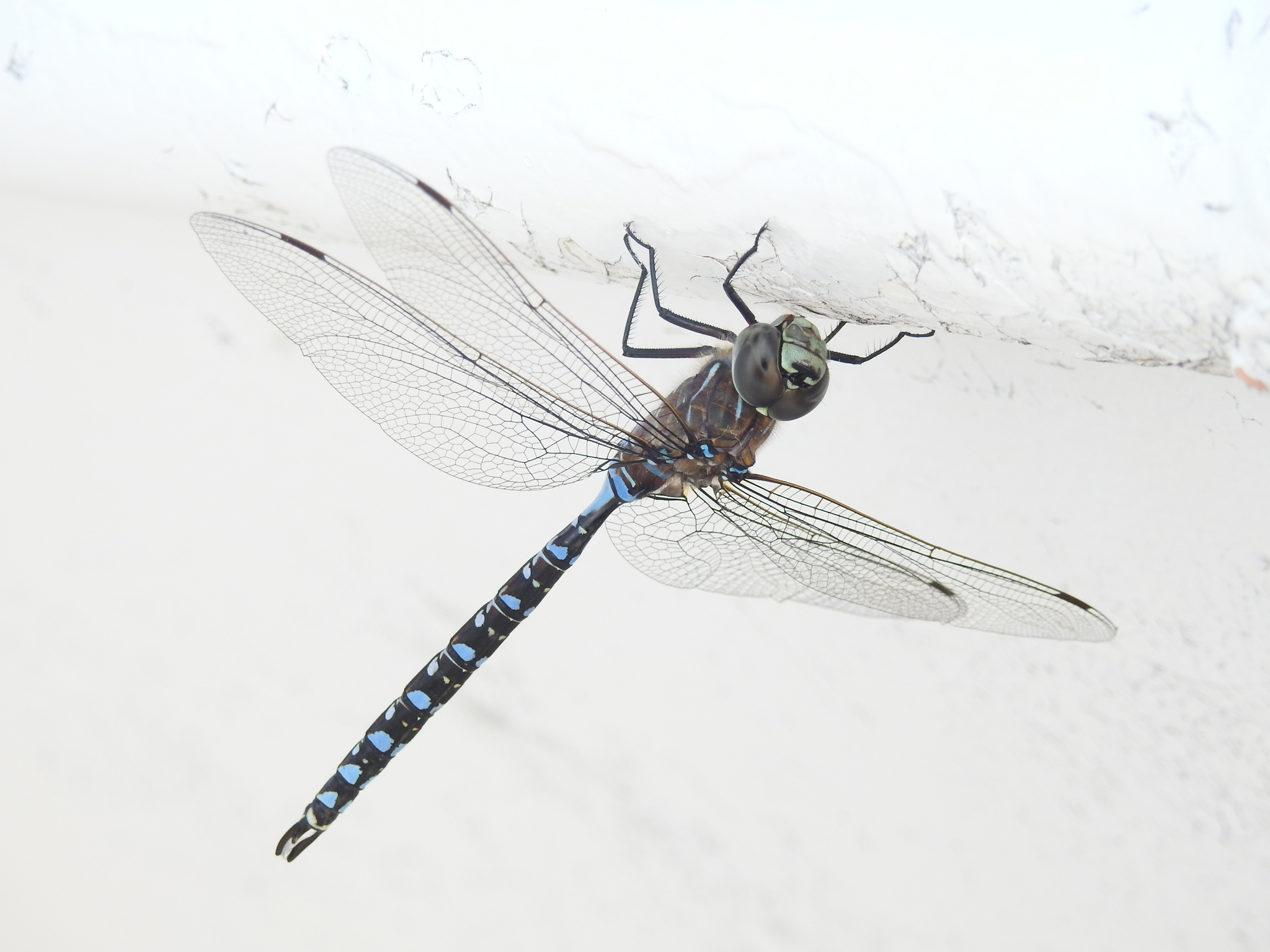
- Female

Scientific classification
- Kingdom: Animalia
- Phylum: Arthropoda
- Class: Insecta
- Order: Odonata
- Infraorder: Anisoptera
- Family: Aeshnidae
- Genus: Aeshna
- Species: A. interrupta

Binomial name
- Aeshna interrupta (Walker, 1904)

= Variable darner =

Species of dragonfly

The variable darner (Aeshna interrupta) is a dragonfly of the family Aeshnidae, native from Alaska through the Northwest Territories to Newfoundland, south to New Hampshire and Michigan in the eastern United States, and to the mountains of New Mexico, Arizona, and California in the west. It's named after the distinctive broken stripes on the sides of the thorax of many male specimens. It lives in many habitats from northern and mountain peatlands to cattail marshes and temporary pools. It is the characteristic species of grassland ponds.
