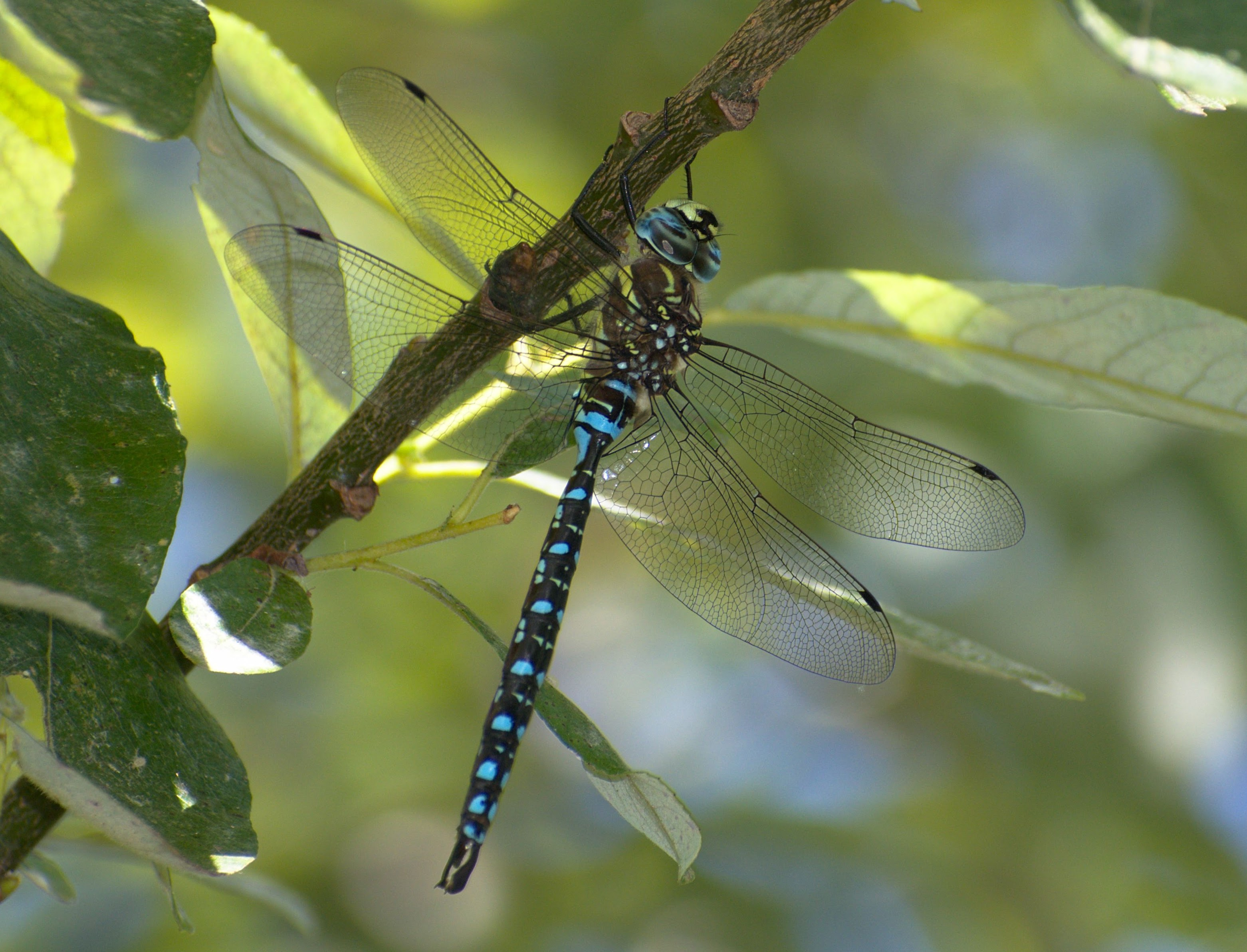
- Male

Conservation status
- Least Concern (IUCN 3.1)

Scientific classification
- Domain: Eukaryota
- Kingdom: Animalia
- Phylum: Arthropoda
- Class: Insecta
- Order: Odonata
- Infraorder: Anisoptera
- Family: Aeshnidae
- Genus: Aeshna
- Species: A. palmata

Binomial name
- Aeshna palmata Hagen, 1856

= Paddle-tailed darner =

Species of dragonfly

The paddle-tailed darner (Aeshna palmata) is a species of dragonfly in the family Aeshnidae. It is common throughout western Canada and United States. This species is named after its distinctive paddle-shaped appendages. It lives in many habitats, particularly lakes, ponds, and slow streams, usually with dense shore vegetation. Aeshna palmata was scientifically described for the first time in 1856 by Hermann Hagen.
