= Norma Ford Walker =

Canadian scientist

Norma Ford Walker FRSC
- Born: Norma Henrietta Carswell Ford; September 3, 1893; St. Thomas, Ontario
- Died: August 9, 1968 (aged 74); Toronto
- Citizenship: Canadian
- Education: University of Toronto
- Known for: Genetic Counseling, Research on the Dionne Quintuplets
- Spouse: Edmund Murton Walker
- Scientific career
- Fields: Medical Genetics, Entomology, Dermatoglyphics
- Workplaces: Toronto Hospital for Sick Children
- Thesis: A Comparative Study of the Abdominal Musculature of Orthopteroid Insects (1923)
- Doctoral advisor: Edmund Murton Walker
- Doctoral students: Irene Uchida

Norma Ford Walker (September 3, 1893 – August 9, 1968) was a Canadian scientist who pioneered the development of medical genetics as a research field. Though she began her academic career as an entomologist, working as an invertebrate zoologist at the University of Toronto, she became interested in medical genetics in the 1930s, and researched the medical genetics of the then famous Dionne Quintuplets. She was an original founding member of the American Society of Human Genetics and between 1947 and 1962, was the first director of the Department of Genetics at what was then the Toronto Hospital for Sick Children. She was a strong advocate for women in science, and supervised many women would later become the first appointed department heads of human genetics at many Canadian universities. Her academic career spanned six decades and she published prolifically in both human genetics and entomology. She was elected a Fellow of the Royal Society of Canada in 1958.

== Life and work ==
Norma Henrietta Carswell Ford was born September 3, 1893, at St Thomas, Ontario to Norman W. Ford and Margaret Henrietta Dyke She entered into a BA degree at the University of Toronto in 1914 and completed her PhD in zoology there in 1923, under the supervision of Edmund Murton Walker. In the late 1910s, prior to completing her PhD, she taught biology classes for women and throughout the 1920s she would give lectures on biology, health, and human genetics to various women's groups including the Girl Guides.

Her early work was in invertebrate zoology, and in addition to her thesis (completed in 1923), she published several papers on the physiology and behaviour of the Grylloblatteria and the sarcophagid fly, Wohlfahrtia In 1937, she was co-principal investigator on a study tasked with determining whether the Dionne Quintuplets were truly genetically identical, and left entomology behind. In 1943, she married Edmund Walker.

Between 1937 and her death she made many valuable contributions to the study of human genetics, and became a globally renowned expert on multiple births. She was the first person to apply dermatoglyphics in the diagnosis of Down syndrome.

She taught Oliver Smithies genetics in her lab and with him, demonstrated that haptoglobin types were inherited

In 1966, she was awarded an honorary degree from Queen's University, Kingston for her scientific achievements.
