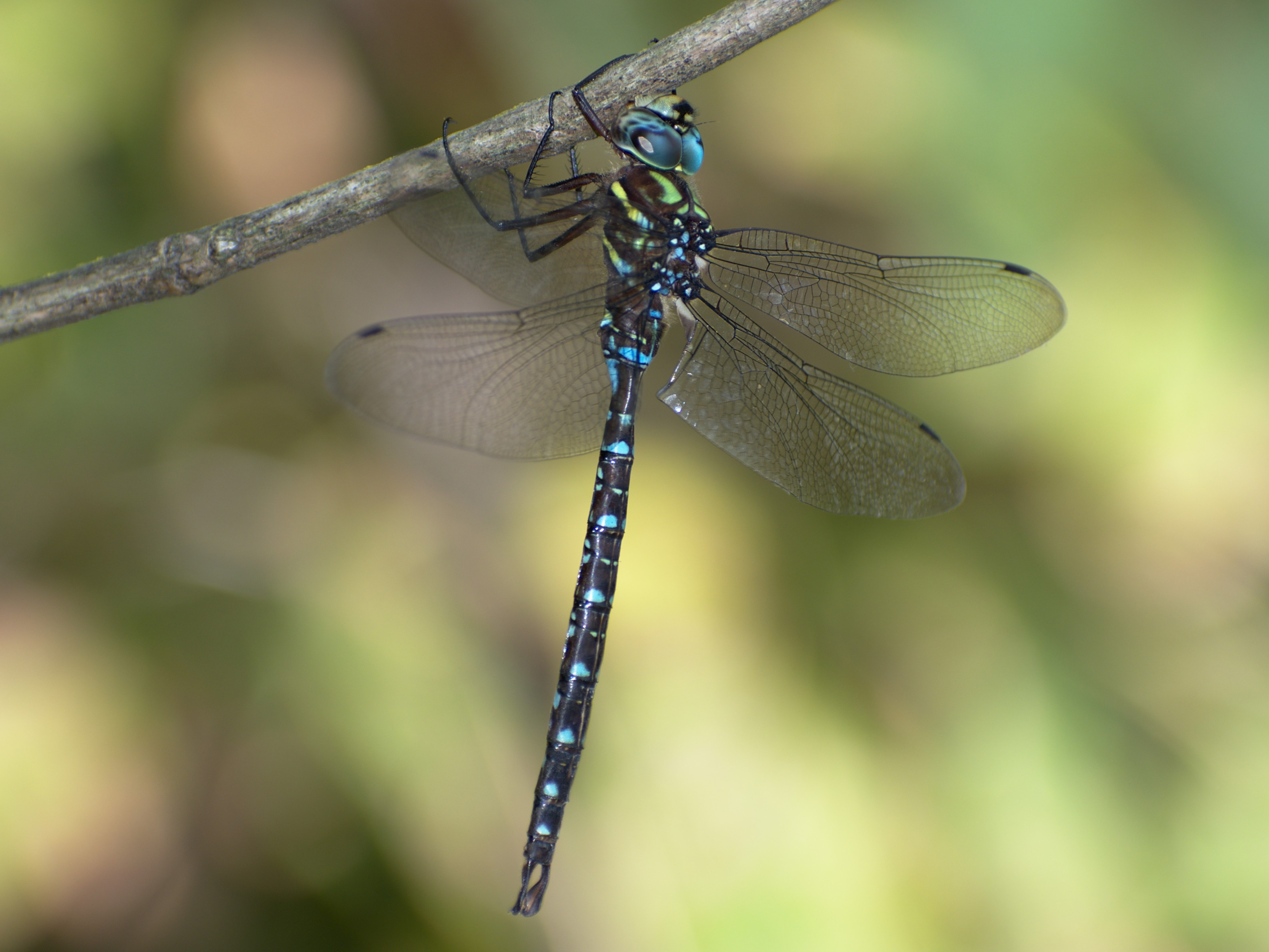
- Male
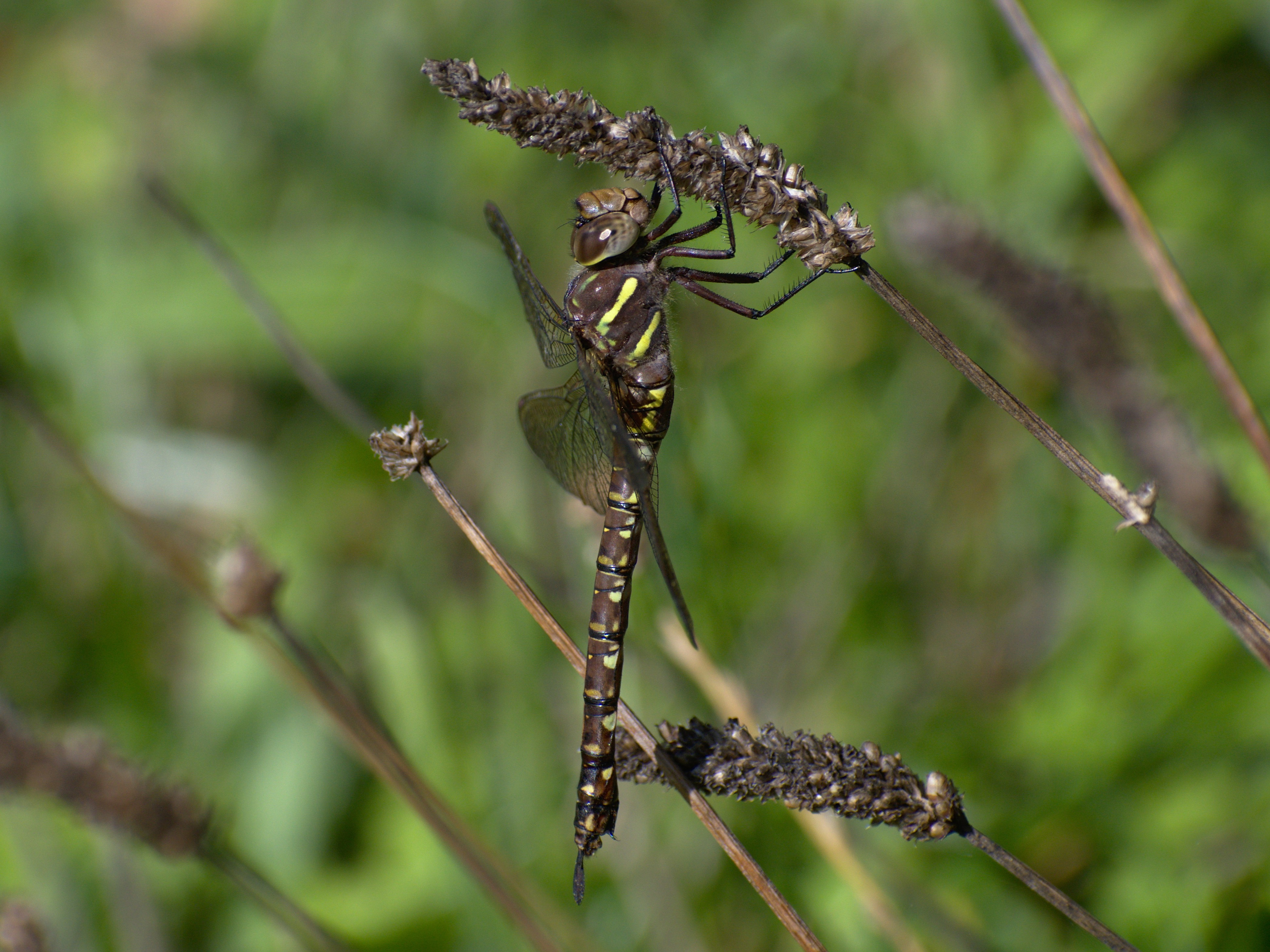
- Female

Scientific classification
- Kingdom: Animalia
- Phylum: Arthropoda
- Clade: Pancrustacea
- Class: Insecta
- Order: Odonata
- Infraorder: Anisoptera
- Family: Aeshnidae
- Genus: Aeshna
- Species: A. umbrosa

Binomial name
- Aeshna umbrosa (Walker, 1908)

= Shadow darner =

Species of dragonfly

The shadow darner (Aeshna umbrosa) is a species of dragonfly in the family Aeshnidae. It is found in almost all of Canada and most states in the United States.

== Identification ==
The shadow darner is a large dragonfly with a length of 68 to 78 mm (2.7 to 3.1 in). The base is brownish black in color. Greenish crescent-shaped spots are found at the top of the thorax. The sides of the thorax are marked with two yellowish to yellowish-green diagonal stripes. Its abdomen is marked with bluish green spots. The male shadow darner has paddle-shaped anal appendages.

The naiad of the shadow darner is large in size, with a length of 38 to 43 mm (1.5 to 1.7 in). This naiad is long and slender, which is the typical shape of immature darners. It is mottled green and brown. The shadow darner has a vertically flattened cerci with a spike at the end.

== Distribution ==
This dragonfly is found in most of the United States except the dry Southwest and in all of the provinces and territories of Canada.

== Habitat and diet ==
The shadow darner patrols along small marshy streams. It is often found feeding along woodland edges or even in deep shadow in full forest. Shadow darners can also be found near ditches, slow streams, and ponds. This darner has a long flight season of late April to November.

The shadow darner naiad feeds on a wide variety of aquatic insects, such as mosquito larvae, other aquatic fly larvae, mayfly larvae, and freshwater shrimp. They also feed on small fish and tadpoles. This adult will eat almost any soft-bodied flying insect, including mosquitoes, flies, butterflies, moths, mayflies, and stoneflies.

== Ecology ==
The naiad is an active predator and are able to swim by jet propulsion. They squirt water out from the ends of their abdomens. They will generally take several years to mature, and when the immature changes into a dragonfly, it does so at night. This behavior probably was evolved to avoid being eaten by daytime predators. The adult generally flies from late April to November, and does all of its hunting while on the wing. The shadow darner is able to regulate its body temperature which enables it to fly in temperatures too cold for most dragonflies. This dragonfly species in particular seems to be extremely cold tolerant. This dragonfly flies at dusk and in shaded areas, and it flies later into the fall than any species other than the yellow-legged meadowhawk (Sympetrum vicinum).

== Reproduction ==
Male shadow darners establish and defend territories along the shores of slow streams and ponds. After mating, females fly singly, without the male attached, to lay their eggs in the stems and leaves of aquatic plants.

== Subspecies ==
- Aeshna umbrosa occidentalis
- Aeshna umbrosa umbrosa
