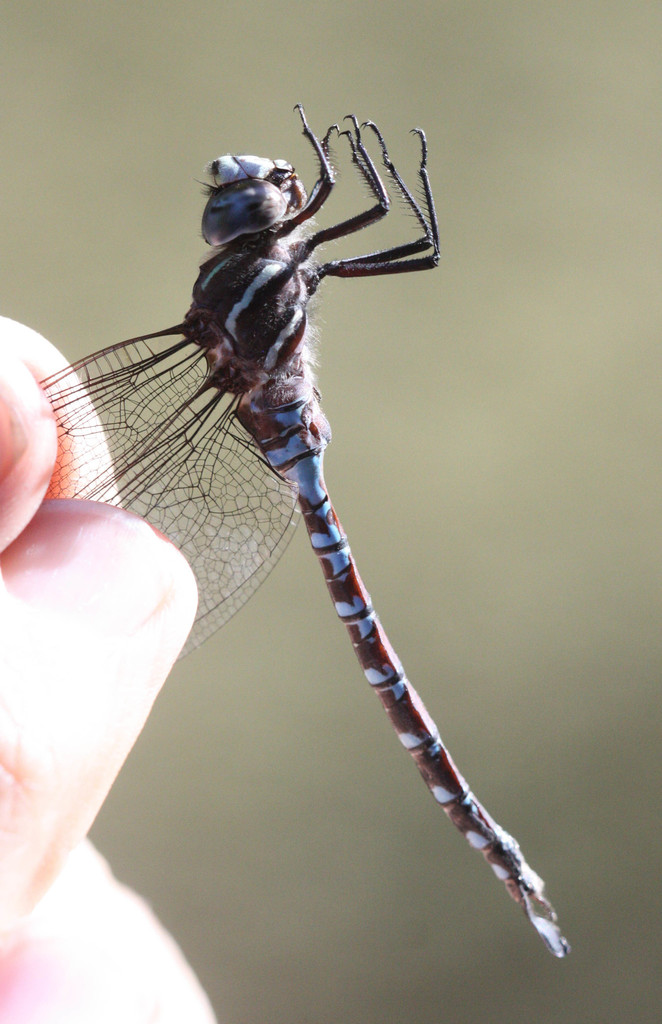

Conservation status
- Least Concern (IUCN 3.1)

Scientific classification
- Kingdom: Animalia
- Phylum: Arthropoda
- Class: Insecta
- Order: Odonata
- Infraorder: Anisoptera
- Family: Aeshnidae
- Genus: Aeshna
- Species: A. walkeri

Binomial name
- Aeshna walkeri Kennedy, 1917

= Aeshna walkeri =

Species of dragonfly

Aeshna walkeri, or Walker's darner, is a species of darner in the dragonfly family Aeshnidae. It is found in Central America and North America.

The IUCN conservation status of Aeshna walkeri is "LC", least concern, with no immediate threat to the species' survival. The population is stable. The IUCN status was reviewed in 2017.
