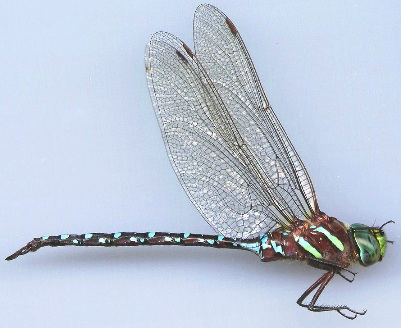

Conservation status
- Least Concern (IUCN 3.1)

Scientific classification
- Kingdom: Animalia
- Phylum: Arthropoda
- Class: Insecta
- Order: Odonata
- Infraorder: Anisoptera
- Family: Aeshnidae
- Genus: Aeshna
- Species: A. tuberculifera

Binomial name
- Aeshna tuberculifera Walker, 1908

= Aeshna tuberculifera =

Species of dragonfly

Aeshna tuberculifera, the black-tipped darner, is a species of darner in the dragonfly family Aeshnidae. It is found in North America.

The IUCN conservation status of Aeshna tuberculifera is "LC", least concern, with no immediate threat to the species' survival. The population is stable. The IUCN status was reviewed in 2017.

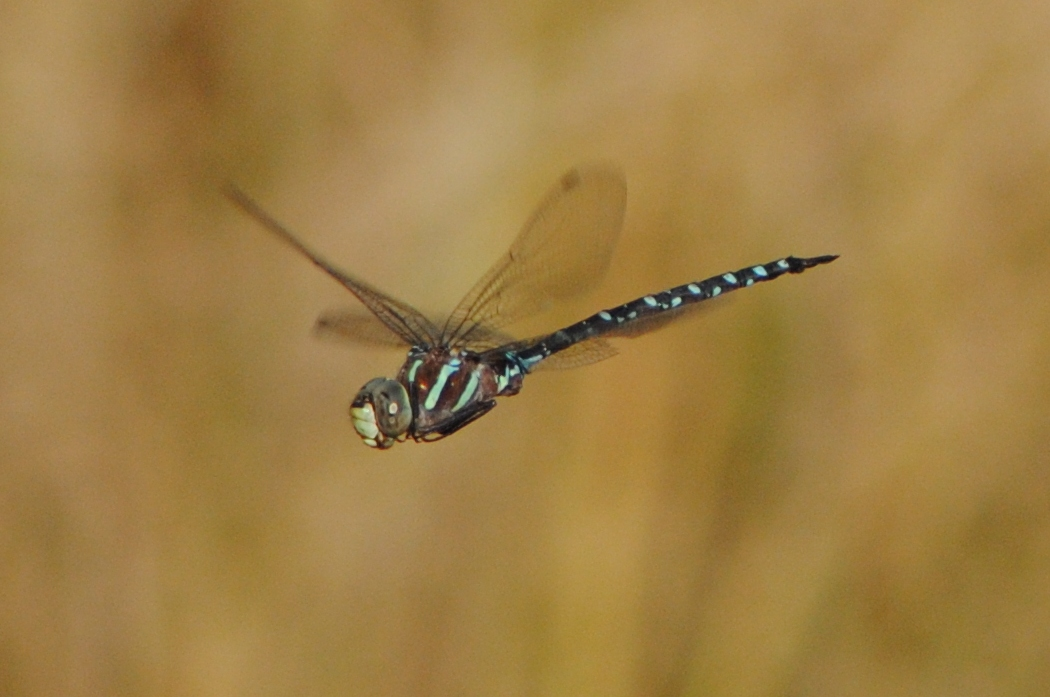
Black-tipped darner, Aeshna tuberculifera
