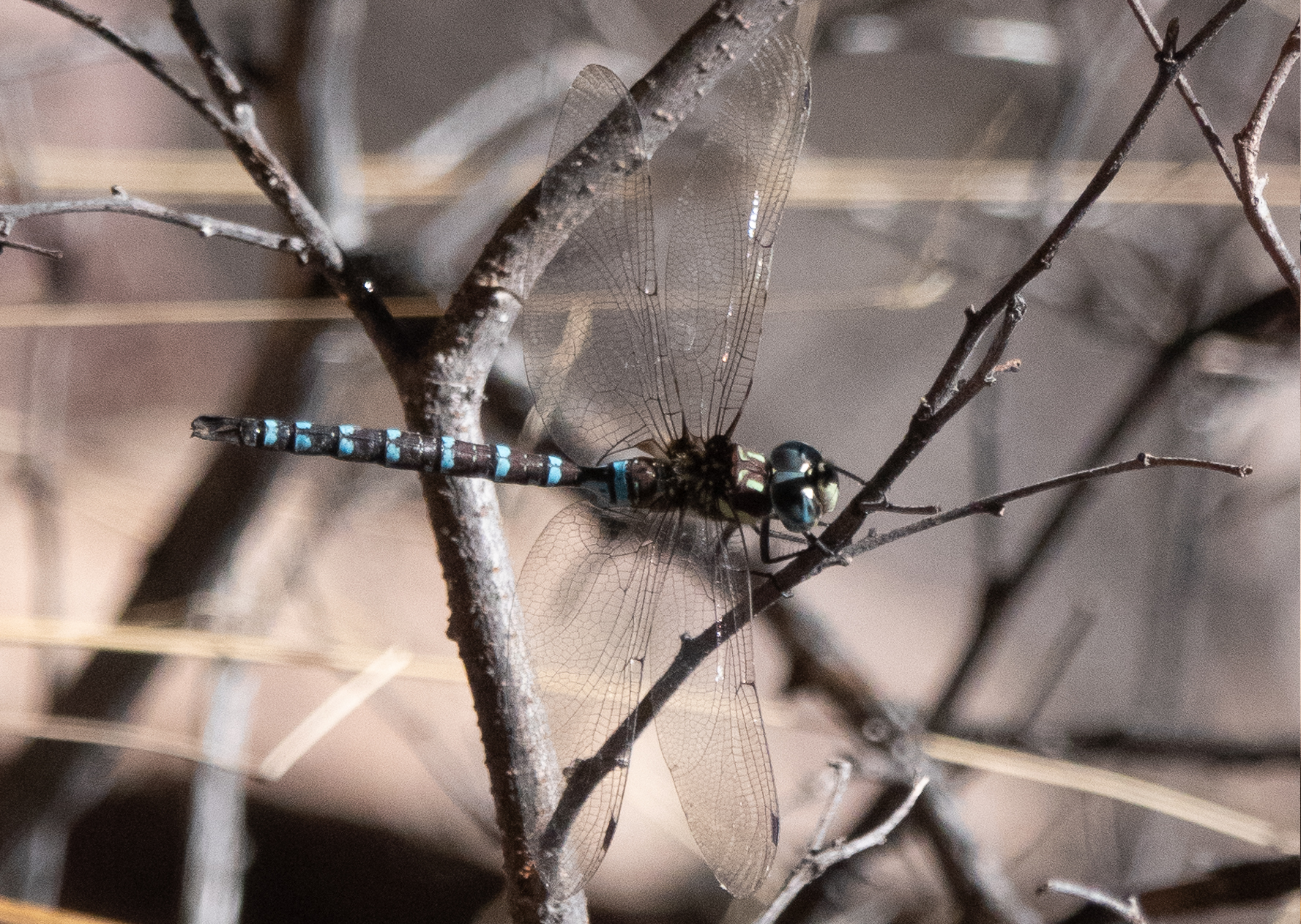

Conservation status
- Least Concern (IUCN 3.1)

Scientific classification
- Kingdom: Animalia
- Phylum: Arthropoda
- Class: Insecta
- Order: Odonata
- Infraorder: Anisoptera
- Family: Aeshnidae
- Genus: Aeshna
- Species: A. persephone

Binomial name
- Aeshna persephone Donnelly, 1961

= Aeshna persephone =

Persephone's darner

Species of dragonfly

Aeshna persephone, Persephone's darner, is a species of dragonfly in the family Aeshnidae. It is found in northern Mexico and the southwestern United States. Its natural habitats are rivers and intermittent rivers.
