= Alexander Michailovitsch Djakonov =

Russian entomologist (1886–1956)

Alexander Mikhailovich Djakonov
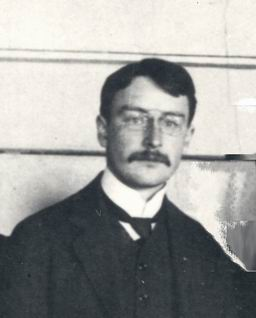
- Born: 4 January 1886; Saint Petersburg, Russian Empire
- Died: 1 April 1956 (aged 70); Leningrad, Soviet Union
- Education: Saint Petersburg State University
- Known for: Founder of the Echinoderm Department at the Zoological Institute of the Russian Academy of Sciences
- Awards: Order of Lenin, Order of the Red Banner of Labour
- Scientific career
- Fields: Zoology, Entomology, Lepidopterology

Alexander Mikhailovich Djakonov (Russian: Александр Михайлович Дьяконов; 4 January 1886 – 1 April 1956) was a Russian and Soviet zoologist, entomologist, Doctor of Biological Sciences, professor, and founder of the Echinoderm Department at the Zoological Institute of the Russian Academy of Sciences.

== Biography ==
Alexander Djakonov was born on 4 January 1886. His father, Professor Mikhail Alexandrovich Djakonov, taught the history of Russian law at the University of Yuryev. Later, his father was elected a member of the Academy of Sciences, prompting the family to move to Saint Petersburg.

During his school years, Djakonov became interested in entomology and began collecting butterflies. In summer 1906, he graduated from high school and started scientific work at the White Sea. In the same year, he entered Saint Petersburg State University at the Faculty of Natural History, graduating in 1912 with a first-class degree.

In 1912, Djakonov was elected a full member of the Russian Entomological Society and later served as its vice president from 1931 to 1935.

After university, he became a zoologist at the Zoological Institute of the Academy of Sciences, where he organized the Echinoderm Department. He remained head of the department and senior zoologist until his death.

His first scientific work described a new species of Geometridae moths. As a lepidopterist, he focused almost exclusively on this family, including processing materials from Swedish expeditions to Kamchatka and northwest China. He studied dragonflies during the Olonets expedition of 1922–1923. He named a new species, Aeschna elisabethae, in honor of his wife, geologist E.N. Savelieva.

Djakonov published 45 articles and other works in entomology and left two completed but unpublished manuscripts: Outline of the Insect Fauna of Karadag and Butterflies of Leningrad Oblast. He described instances of gynandromorphism in various Satyridae species. He bequeathed his entomological collection of Lepidoptera to the Zoological Institute of the Russian Academy of Sciences and his entomological library to the Russian Entomological Society.

He participated in numerous research expeditions, collecting butterflies in the Leningrad region, Crimea, Kazakhstan, and the Ussuri region.

During the Second World War, Djakonov published identification guides for pests of cotton and sugar beet in Central Asia and Kazakhstan. He also contributed sections on dragonflies and geometrid moths in insect identification guides edited by Ivan Nikolaevich Filippyev (1928) and Nikolay Plavilshchikov (1948).

Djakonov conducted the first monographic studies of sea stars and brittle stars of Russian seas.

He died in Leningrad on 1 April 1956 and was buried at the Shuvalov Cemetery.

== Awards ==
- Order of Lenin
- Order of the Red Banner of Labour (19 February 1946)
- Various medals
