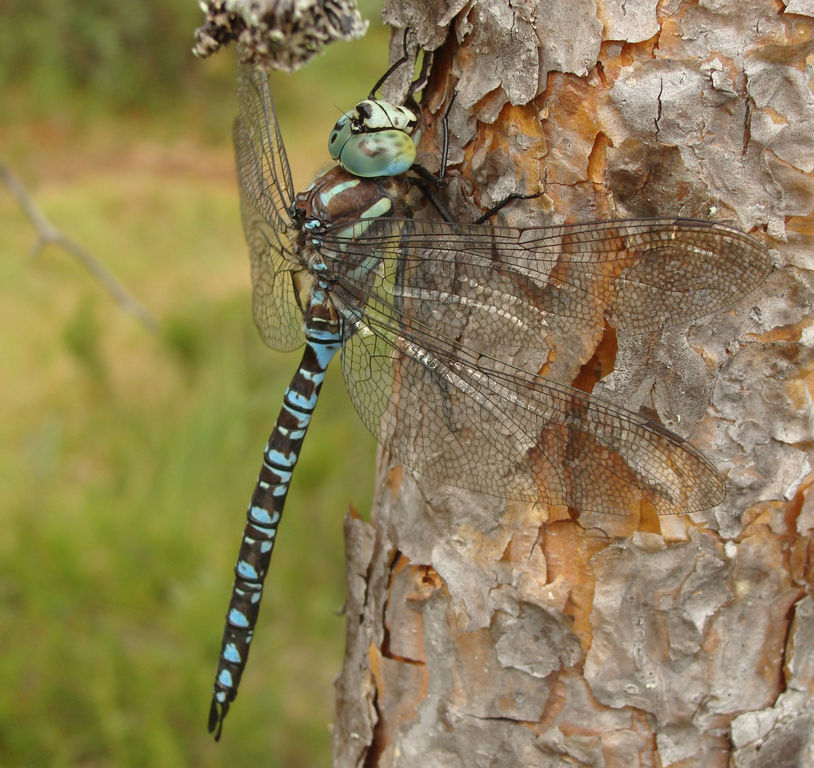
- Male
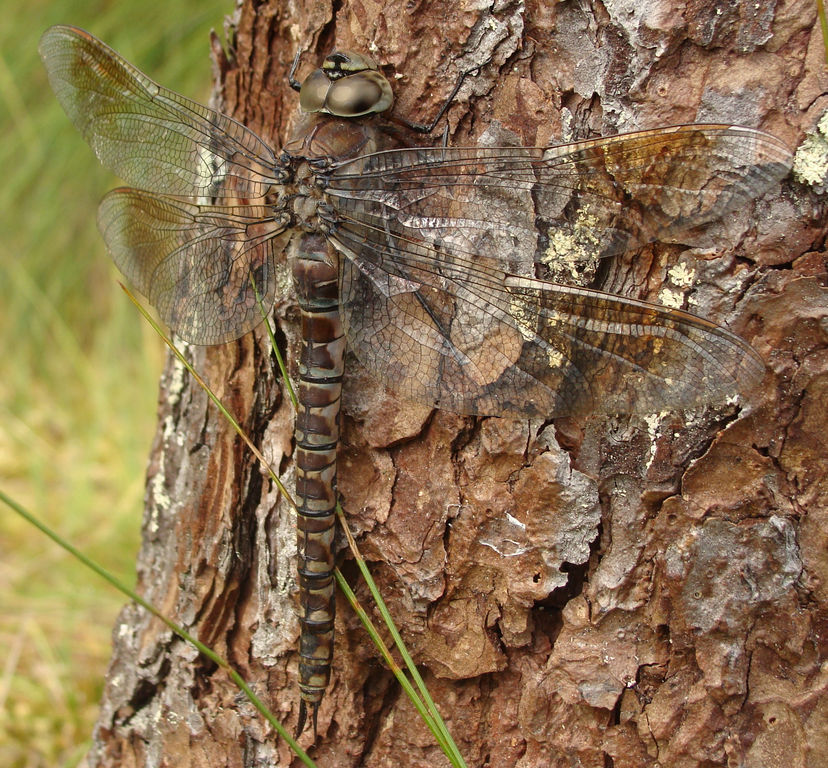
- Female

Conservation status
- Least Concern (IUCN 3.1)

Scientific classification
- Kingdom: Animalia
- Phylum: Arthropoda
- Class: Insecta
- Order: Odonata
- Infraorder: Anisoptera
- Family: Aeshnidae
- Genus: Aeshna
- Species: A. crenata

Binomial name
- Aeshna crenata Hagen, 1856
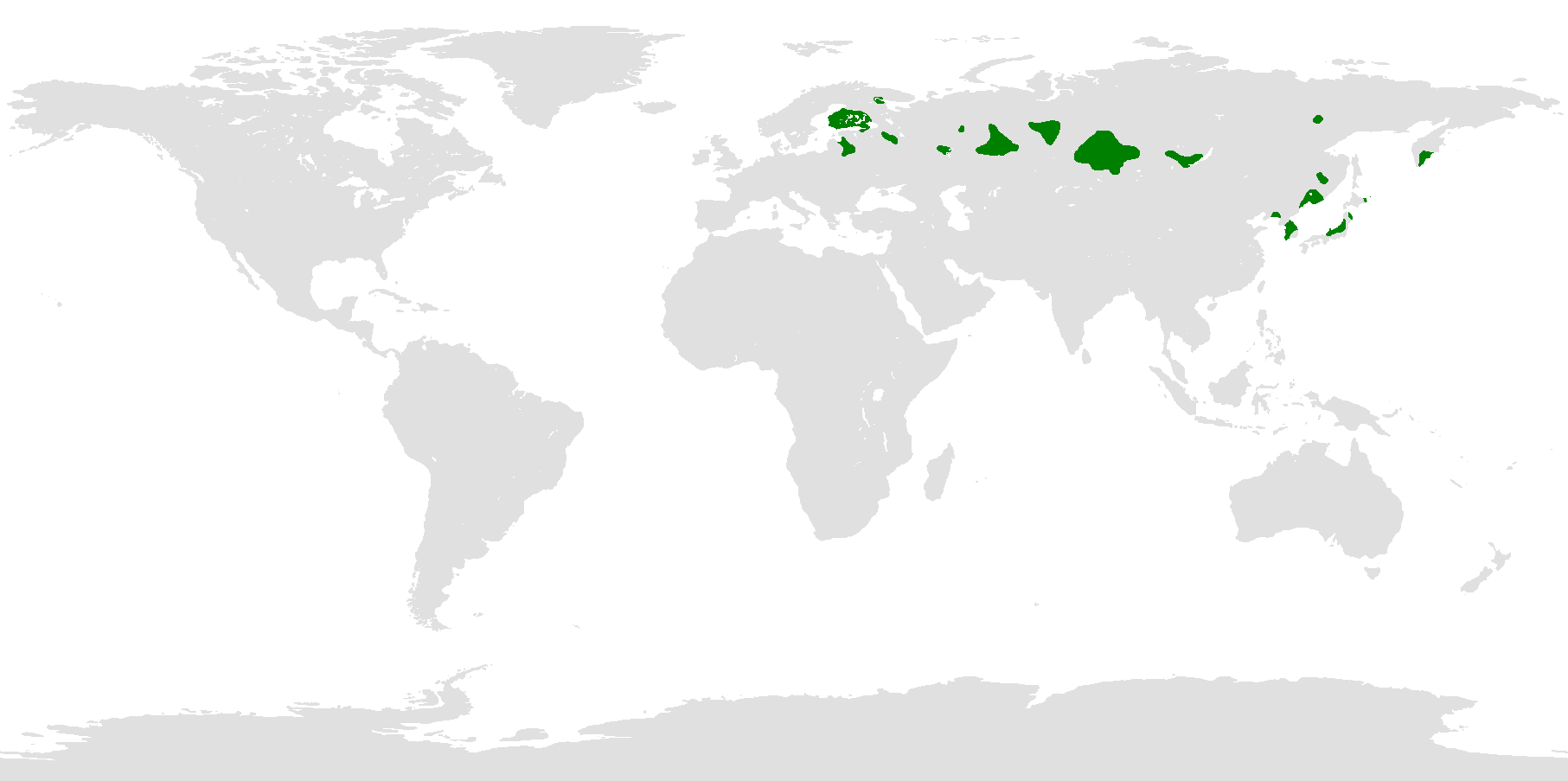
- Range of Aeshna crenata

= Aeshna crenata =

Siberian hawker

Species of dragonfly

Aeshna crenata, the Siberian hawker, is a species of dragonfly in the family Aeshnidae. It is found in Belarus, Finland, Latvia, Lithuania, Japan, and Russia.

This dragonfly is commonly found on freshwater lakes in forested areas.
