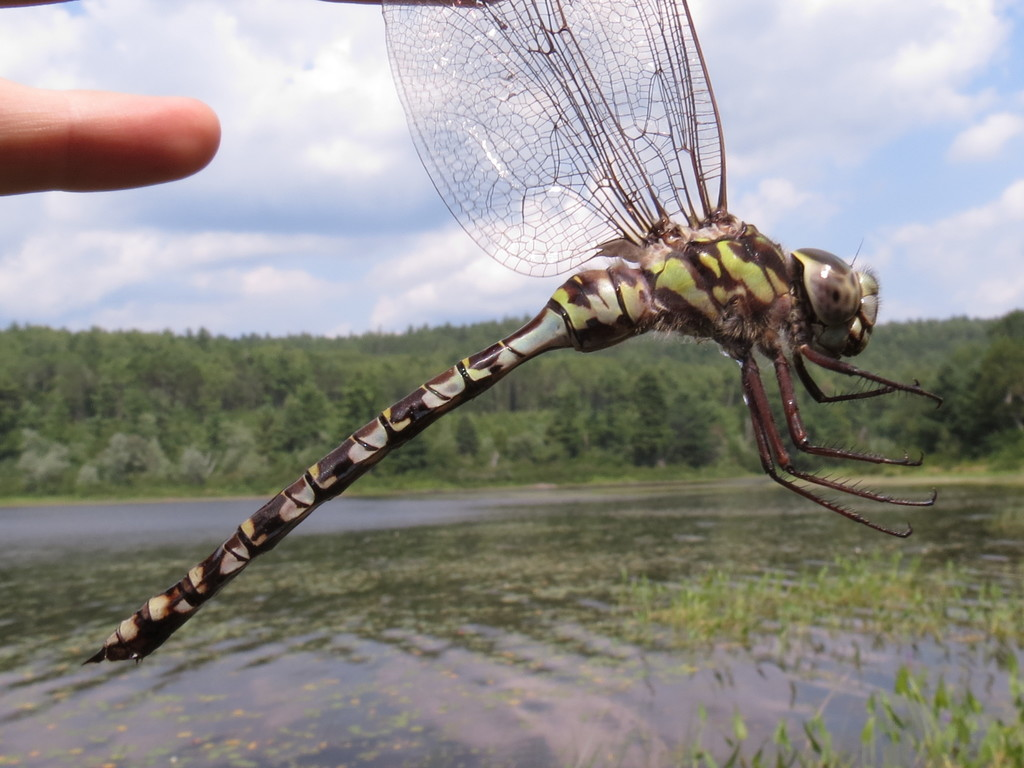

Conservation status
- Least Concern (IUCN 3.1)

Scientific classification
- Kingdom: Animalia
- Phylum: Arthropoda
- Class: Insecta
- Order: Odonata
- Infraorder: Anisoptera
- Family: Aeshnidae
- Genus: Aeshna
- Species: A. clepsydra

Binomial name
- Aeshna clepsydra Say, 1839
- Range of Aeshna clepsydra

= Aeshna clepsydra =

Species of dragonfly

Aeshna clepsydra, the mottled darner, is a species of darner in the dragonfly family Aeshnidae. It is found in North America.

The IUCN conservation status of Aeshna clepsydra is "LC", least concern, with no immediate threat to the species' survival. The population is stable. The IUCN status was reviewed in 2017.
