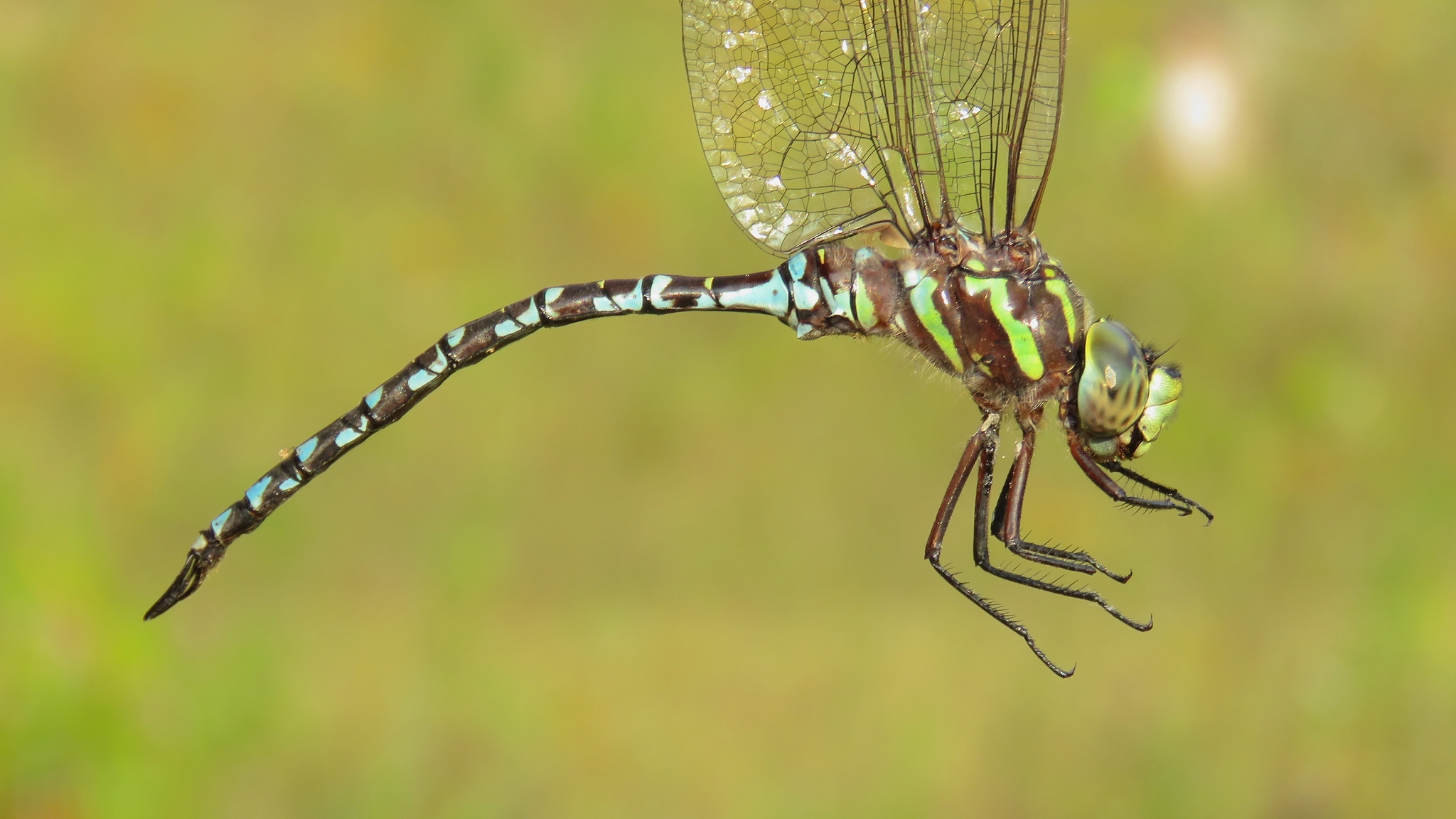

Conservation status
- Least Concern (IUCN 3.1)

Scientific classification
- Kingdom: Animalia
- Phylum: Arthropoda
- Class: Insecta
- Order: Odonata
- Infraorder: Anisoptera
- Family: Aeshnidae
- Genus: Aeshna
- Species: A. verticalis

Binomial name
- Aeshna verticalis Hagen, 1861

= Aeshna verticalis =

Green-striped darner

Species of dragonfly

Aeshna verticalis, the green-striped darner, is a species of dragonfly in the family Aeshnidae. It is typically found in northeastern United States and southern Ontario, Quebec, and New Brunswick. The green-striped darner has an IUCN conservation status of "Least Concern" with a stable population.

== Description ==
Length 7.6 cm (3 in). Similar to A. canadensis but lateral thoracic stripes are all green. Obtusely notched with wide dorsal posterior extension. Some markings may be green in female.

The green-striped darner has an IUCN conservation status of "Least Concern" with a stable population.

== Similar species ==
- Aeshna canadensis – Canada darner
