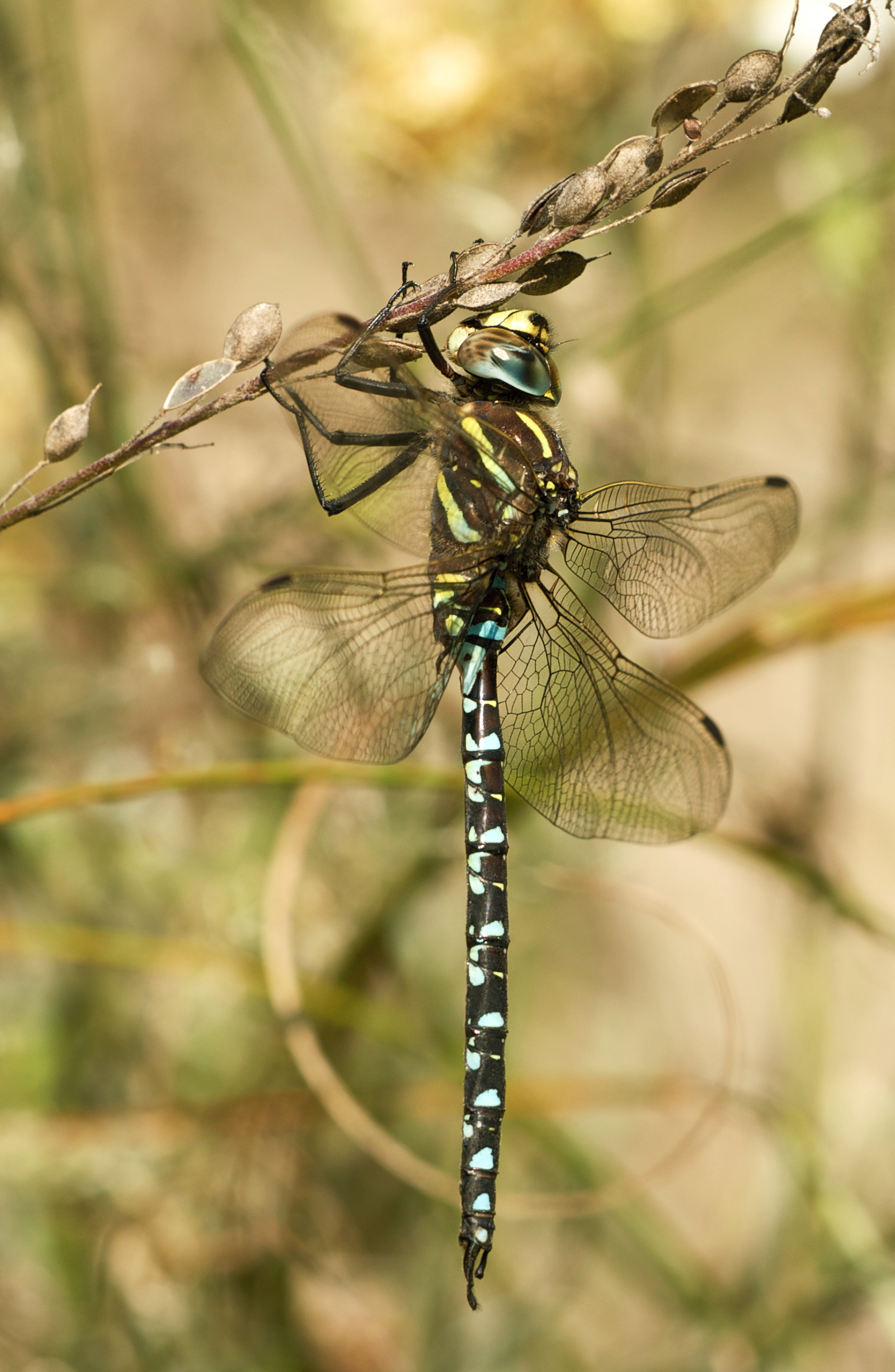

Conservation status
- Least Concern (IUCN 3.1)

Scientific classification
- Kingdom: Animalia
- Phylum: Arthropoda
- Class: Insecta
- Order: Odonata
- Infraorder: Anisoptera
- Family: Aeshnidae
- Genus: Aeshna
- Species: A. juncea

Binomial name
- Aeshna juncea (Linnaeus, 1758)
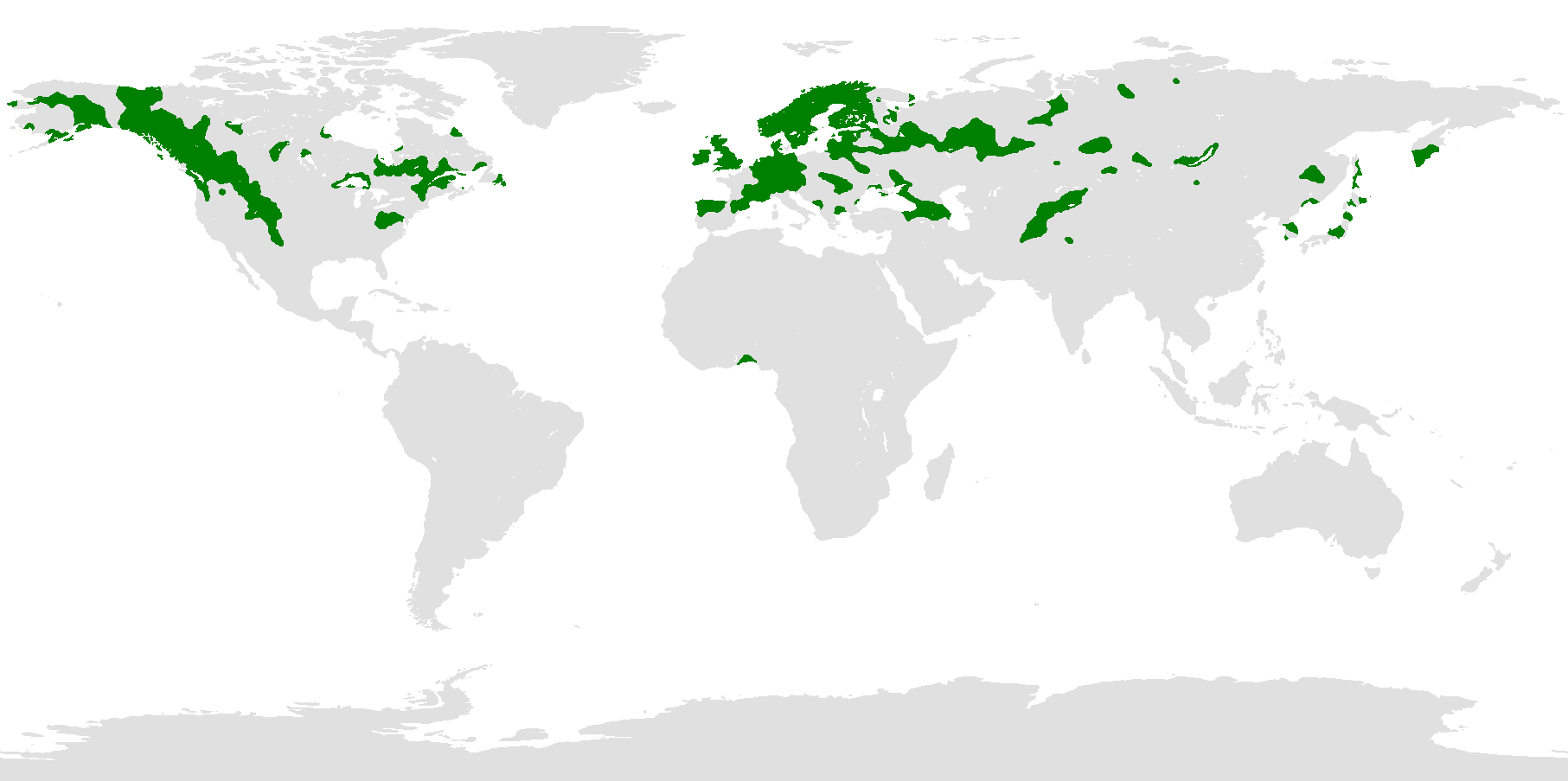
- Range of Aeshna juncea

Synonyms
- Aeshna rustica Zetterstedt, 1840; Aeshna undulata Bartenev, 1930; Libellula juncea L. 1758

= Common hawker =

Species of dragonfly

The common hawker, moorland hawker or sedge darner (Aeshna juncea) is one of the larger species of hawker dragonflies. It is native to Palearctic (from Ireland to Japan) and northern North America. The flight period is from June to early October.

It is 74 millimetres (2.9 in) long with a brown body. The male has a black abdomen with paired blue and yellow spots on each abdominal segment, and narrow stripes along the dorsal surface of the thorax. In the female, the abdomen is brown with yellow or sometimes green or blue spots. The wings of both sexes display a yellow costa (the major vein running along the leading edge of the wings). This species lacks the green thorax stripes of the southern hawker.

Female common hawkers will sometimes dive out of the sky and feign death in order to avoid copulating with males.

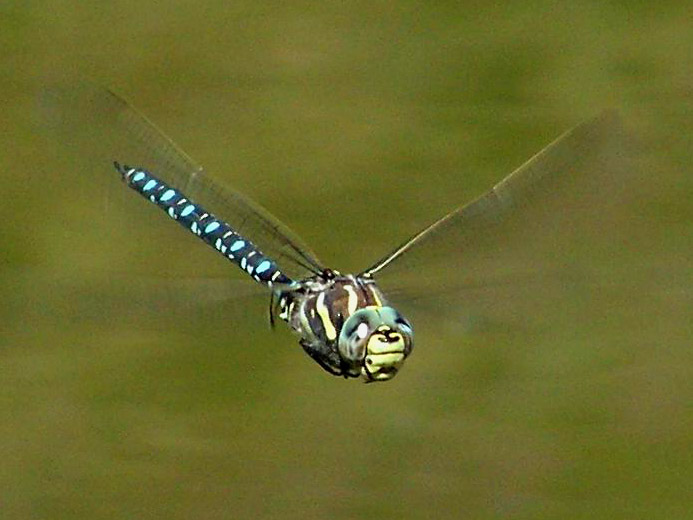
Male hovering
