= Edmund Murton Walker =

Canadian entomologist (1877–1969)

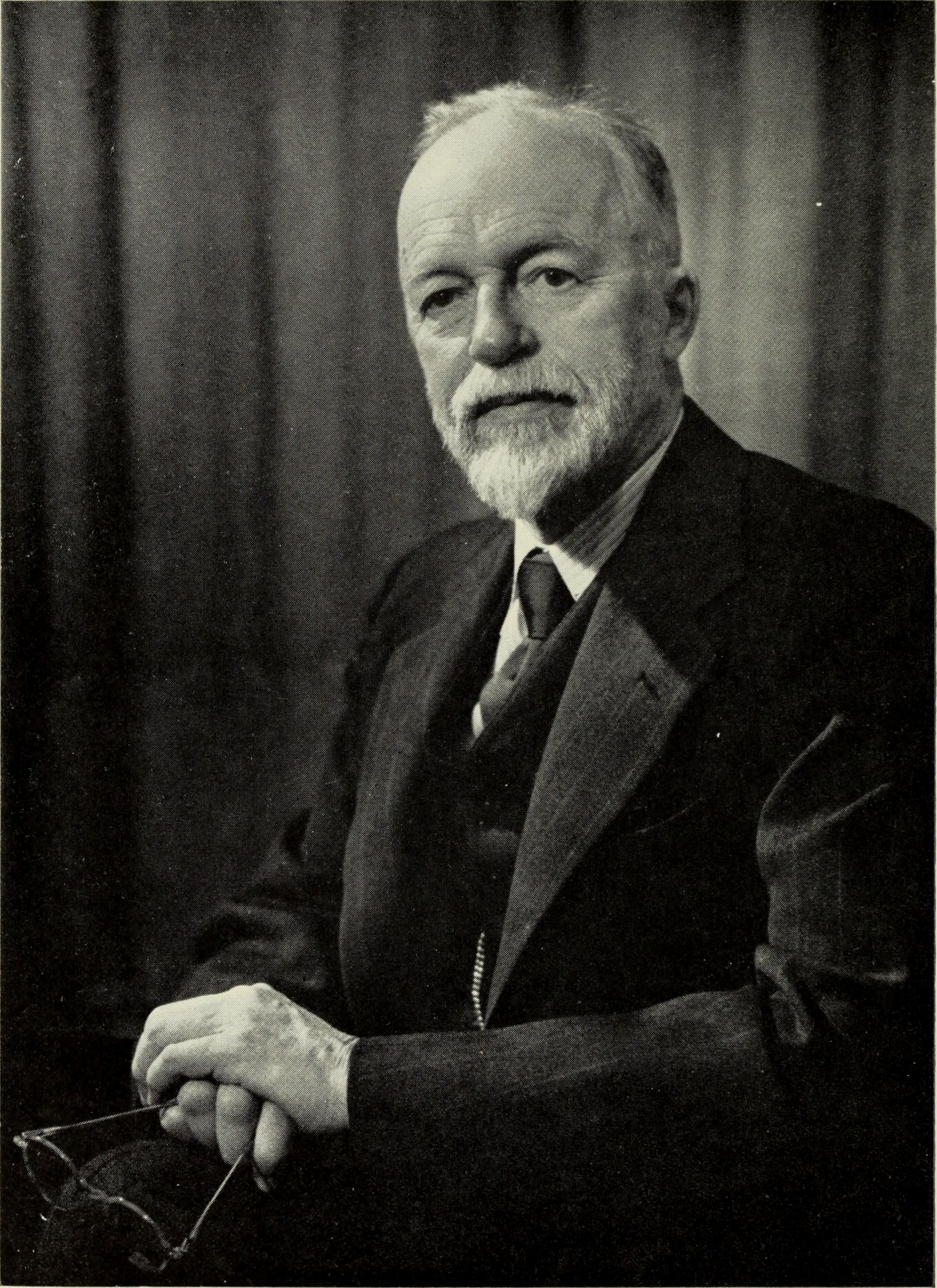
- Born: 5 October 1877; Windsor, Ontario
- Died: 14 February 1969 (aged 91); Toronto
- Awards: Flavelle Medal (1960)
- Scientific career
- Fields: Natural history, entomology
- Workplaces: University of Toronto

Edmund Murton Walker (October 5, 1877 – February 14, 1969) was a Canadian entomologist. He described the genus Grylloblatta in 1914 which he then considered as a member of the Orthoptera. Later, it was recognised as a separate order of insects, the Grylloblattodea (alternatively ranked as a suborder within the order Notoptera).

Walker was born in Windsor, Ontario, the second child and eldest son of Sir Byron Edmund Walker, after whom he was named, and Mary Alexander. He became interested in insects as a boy through the influence of William Saunders. After studying natural sciences at the University of Toronto he went to study medicine. He went to intern at the Toronto General Hospital but realized that he had little interest in medicine. He then studied zoology under Ramsay Wright at the Department of Zoology before going to study invertebrate biology at the University of Berlin. He returned to work as a lecturer in zoology at the University of Toronto in 1906 and became the head of zoology in 1934. He retired in 1948.

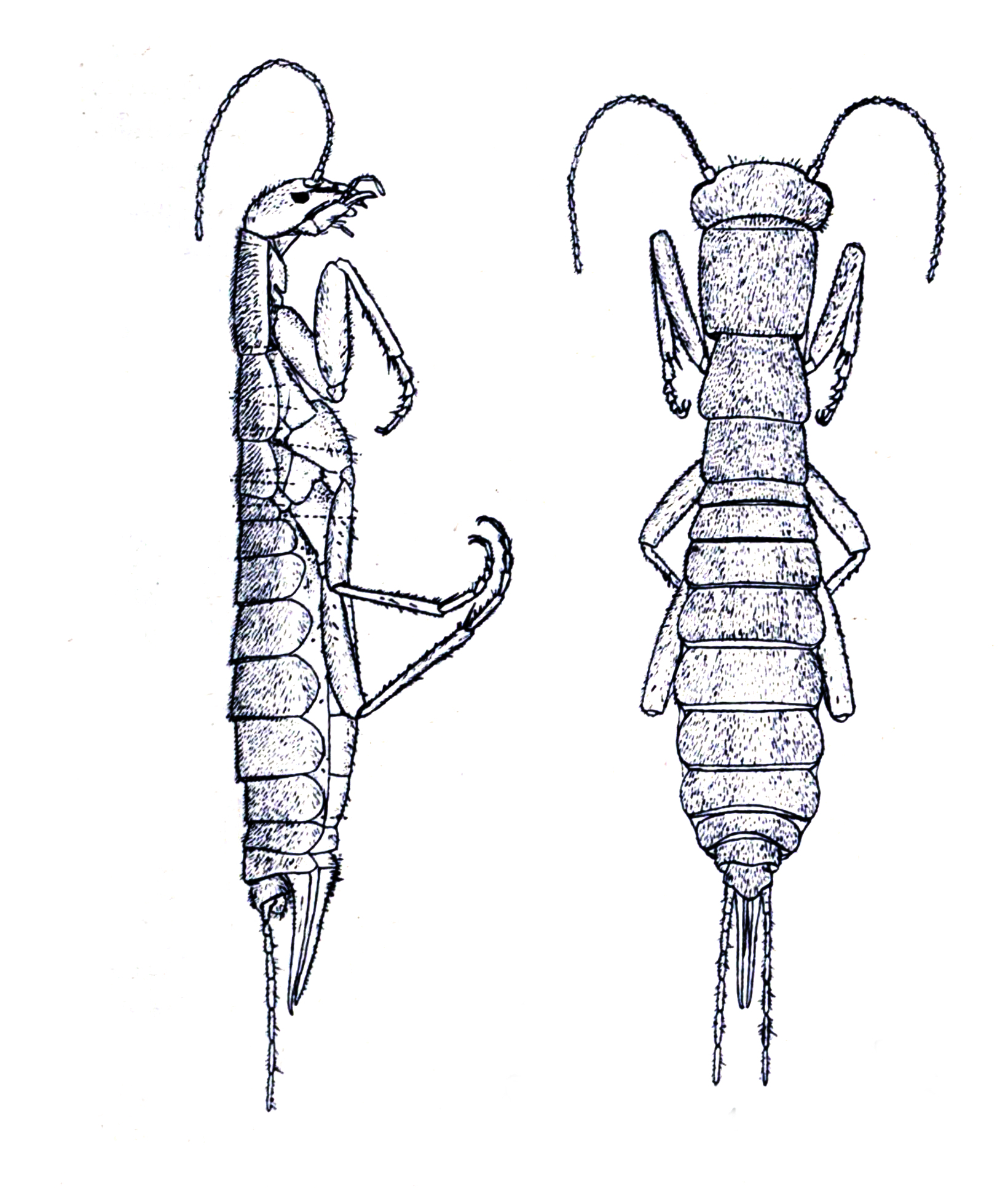
Illustration of Grylloblatta campodeiformis in Walker's publication

On 29 June 1913, his assistant Takatsuna B. Kurata discovered a peculiar insect under a rock on a scree on Sulphur Mountain, Alberta and Walker immediately knew that it was something peculiar and new. Walker considered it a new family but it was later considered a new order of insects, the Grylloblattodea (sometimes ranked as suborder within the order Notoptera, sister to the heel-walkers or Mantophasmatodea). He noted the peculiar characters but considered it a primitive lineage of orthopterans, and many of his later researches were on the analysis of trends within the Orthoptera.

Another area of work was on the fly Wohlfahrtia vigil and its involvement in cutaneous myiasis in humans. He was also a founding member of the Toronto Field Naturalists' Club. Walker was also a keen botanist, and amateur painter.

Walker founded the invertebrate collection at the Royal Ontario Museum (which his father had helped create) in 1914, and served in various directorships at the museum: as Assistant Director 1918–1931, and as Honorary Director 1931–1969.

He was awarded the Royal Society of Canada's Flavelle medal in 1960 and was awarded an honorary degree from Carleton University. A scholarship named after him is offered by the University of Toronto.

Walker also published the three volume Odonata of Canada and Alaska, considered a definitive work on the topic, and was editor of The Canadian Entomologist from 1910 when he succeeded C.J.S. Bethune until 1920, when he found himself too busy.

Walker died in Toronto in 1969. His first wife died in 1941 while his second, Norma Ford Walker, a geneticist, whom he married in 1943 died a few months before him.
