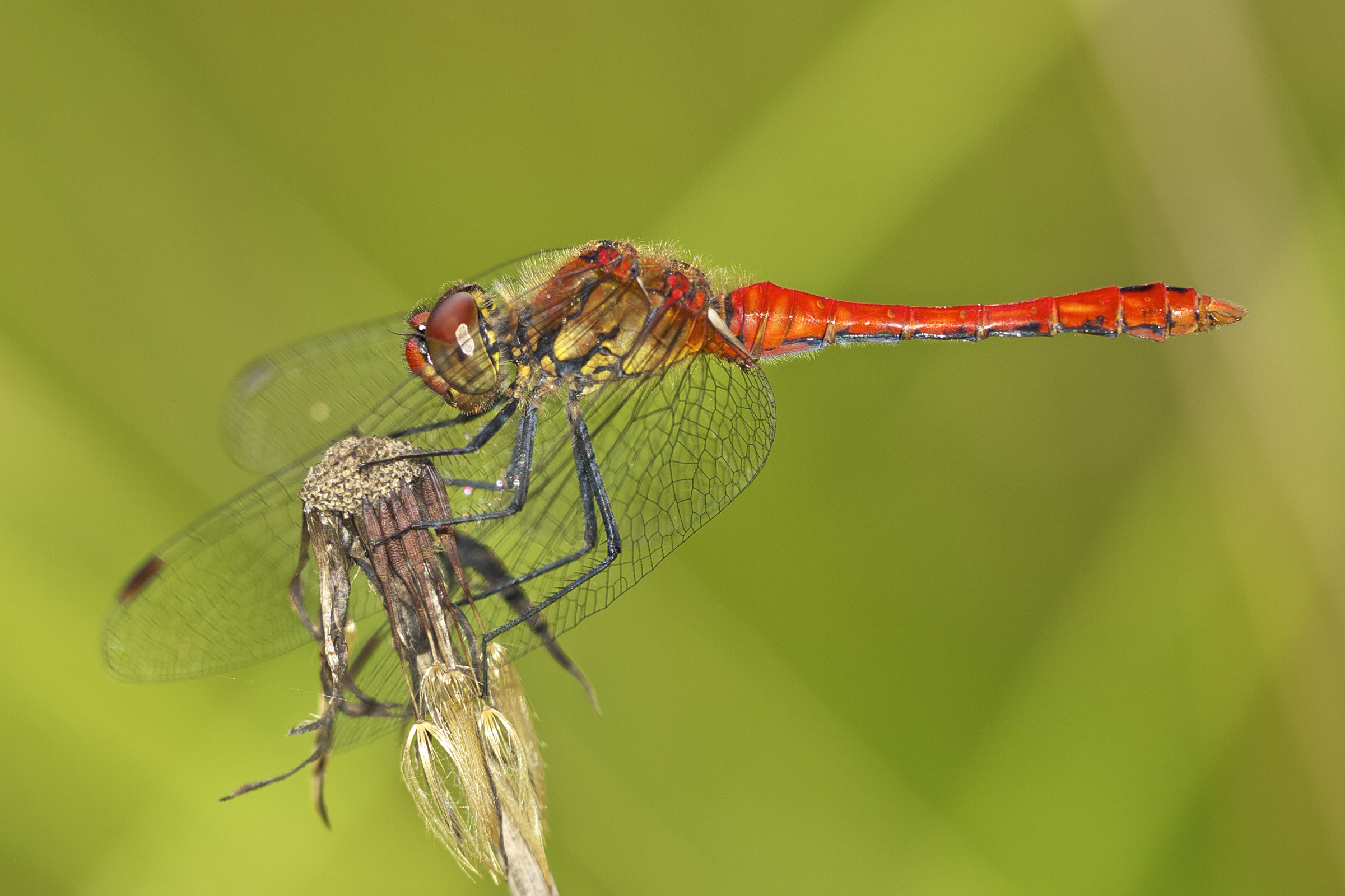
- Male
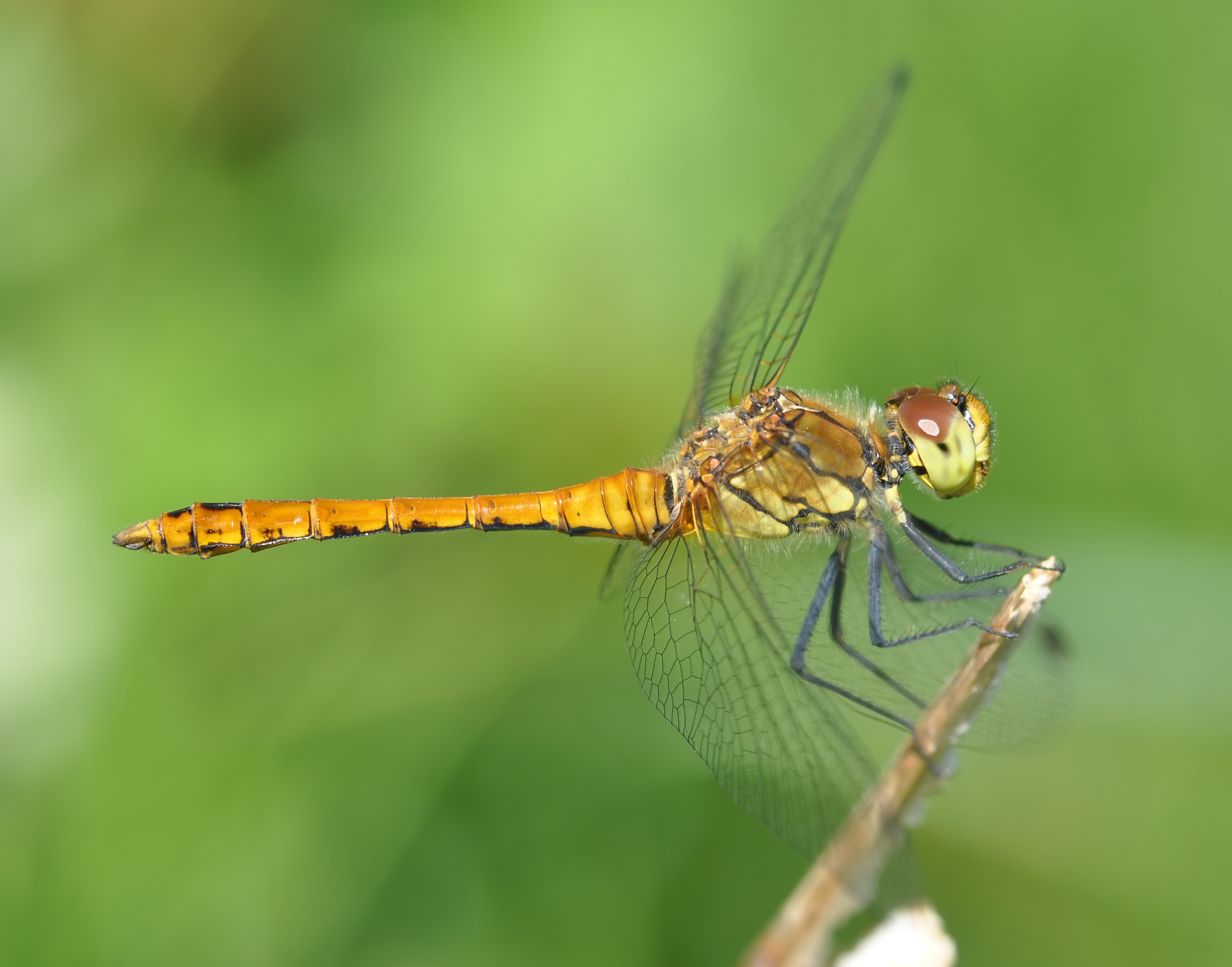
- Female

Conservation status
- Least Concern (IUCN 3.1)

Scientific classification
- Kingdom: Animalia
- Phylum: Arthropoda
- Class: Insecta
- Order: Odonata
- Infraorder: Anisoptera
- Family: Libellulidae
- Genus: Sympetrum
- Species: S. sanguineum

Binomial name
- Sympetrum sanguineum (Müller, 1764)

= Ruddy darter =

Species of dragonfly

The ruddy darter (Sympetrum sanguineum) is a species of dragonfly of the family Libellulidae.

== Distribution ==
The ruddy darter is to be found in temperate regions throughout Europe as far east as Siberia and as far south as the northern Sahara. Its conservation status is regarded as secure, and indeed numbers seem to be increasing in some locations such as central England; it is also spreading north at its northern limit in northeastern England.

It is present in the following countries: Albania; Algeria; Armenia; Austria; Azerbaijan; Belarus; Belgium; Bosnia and Herzegovina; Bulgaria; Croatia; Cyprus; Czech Republic; Denmark; Estonia; Finland; France; Germany; Greece; Hungary; Ireland; Italy; Kazakhstan; Kyrgyzstan; Latvia; Liechtenstein; Lithuania; Luxembourg; Macedonia, the former Yugoslav Republic of; Moldova; Monaco; Montenegro; Morocco; Netherlands; Norway; Poland; Portugal; Romania; Russian Federation; Serbia; Slovakia; Slovenia; Spain; Sweden; Switzerland; Tajikistan; Tunisia; Turkmenistan; Ukraine; United Kingdom; Uzbekistan.

== Habitat ==
This species tends to prefer quiet bodies of water that feature semi-aquatic vegetation such as rushes and reeds.

== Description ==
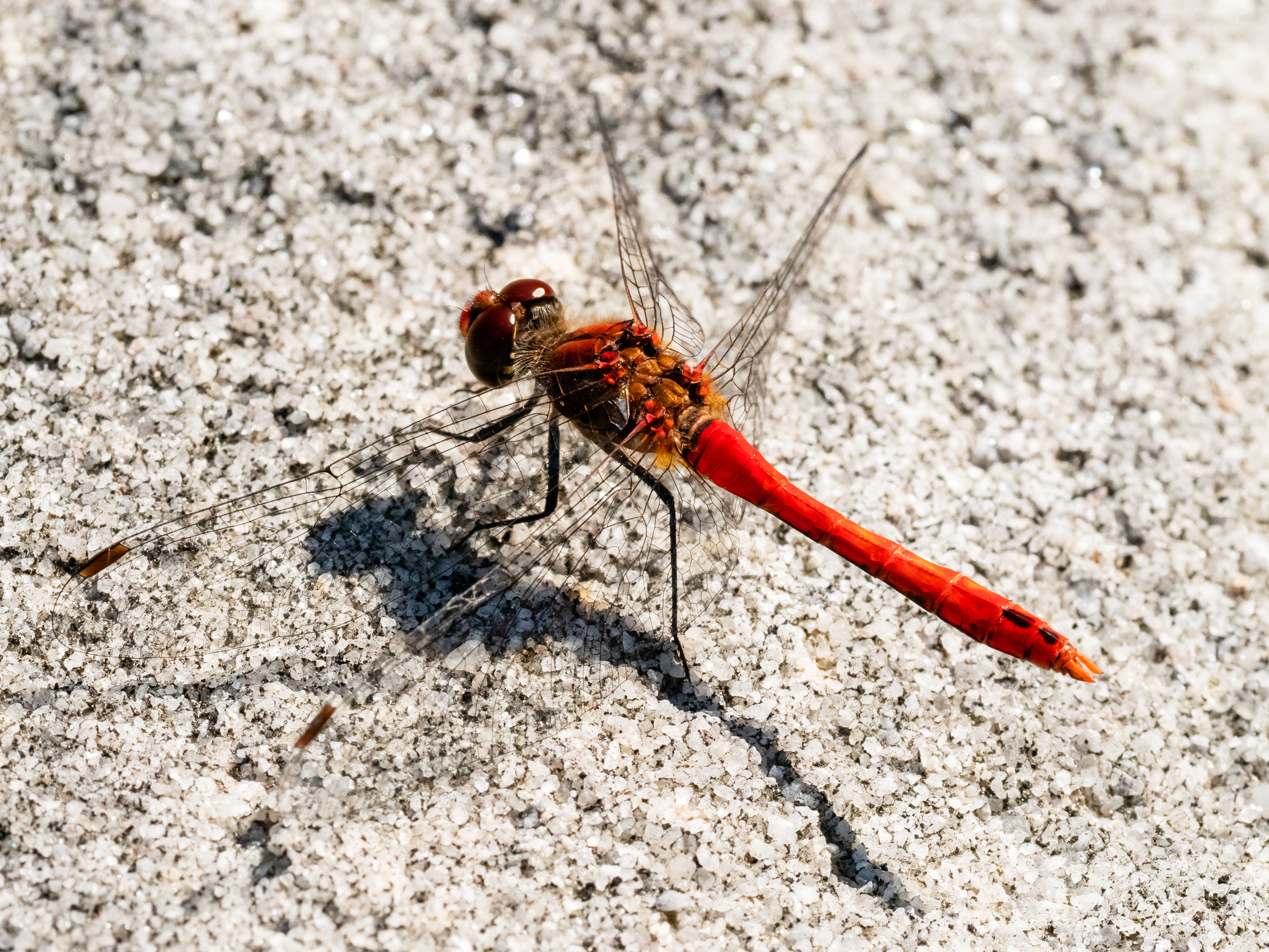
Male, dorsal view

The ruddy darter can reach a body length of 34–36 millimetres (1.3–1.4 in) and attains a wingspan of up to 6 cm (2.4 in). These dragonflies are smaller than the common darter. They have black legs and the wings show a brown pterostigma and an orange colour at the base of the wings. Two evident black marks are located on segments S8 and S9 of the abdomen.

The head, thorax and abdomen of the mature male are vivid red, while the female is slightly smaller, and is a golden-yellow colour with black markings. The blood-red colour of the males develop with maturity, together with a red frons and a red-brown thorax. The abdomen widens for the final third of its length and shows a marked pinched section where it joins the thorax.

The all-black legs of the ruddy darter distinguish it from the otherwise very similar common darter (Sympetrum striolatum) and vagrant darter (Sympetrum vulgatum), both of which show yellow stripes on their legs. The spotted darter (Sympetrum depressiusculum) with all-black legs has noticeably more clubbed abdomen and brighter pterostigmata.

== Life cycle ==
The ruddy darter can be found between the months of June and November. Mating takes place on the wing, with the coupled pair performing a dipping flight over the water. The female jettisons her fertilised eggs at the water surface by alternating movements of the abdomen. The male may hover nearby during this period and protect the female by driving off any approaching males.

The larvae spend the year beneath the water surface before emerging and pupating into adults.

== Gallery ==
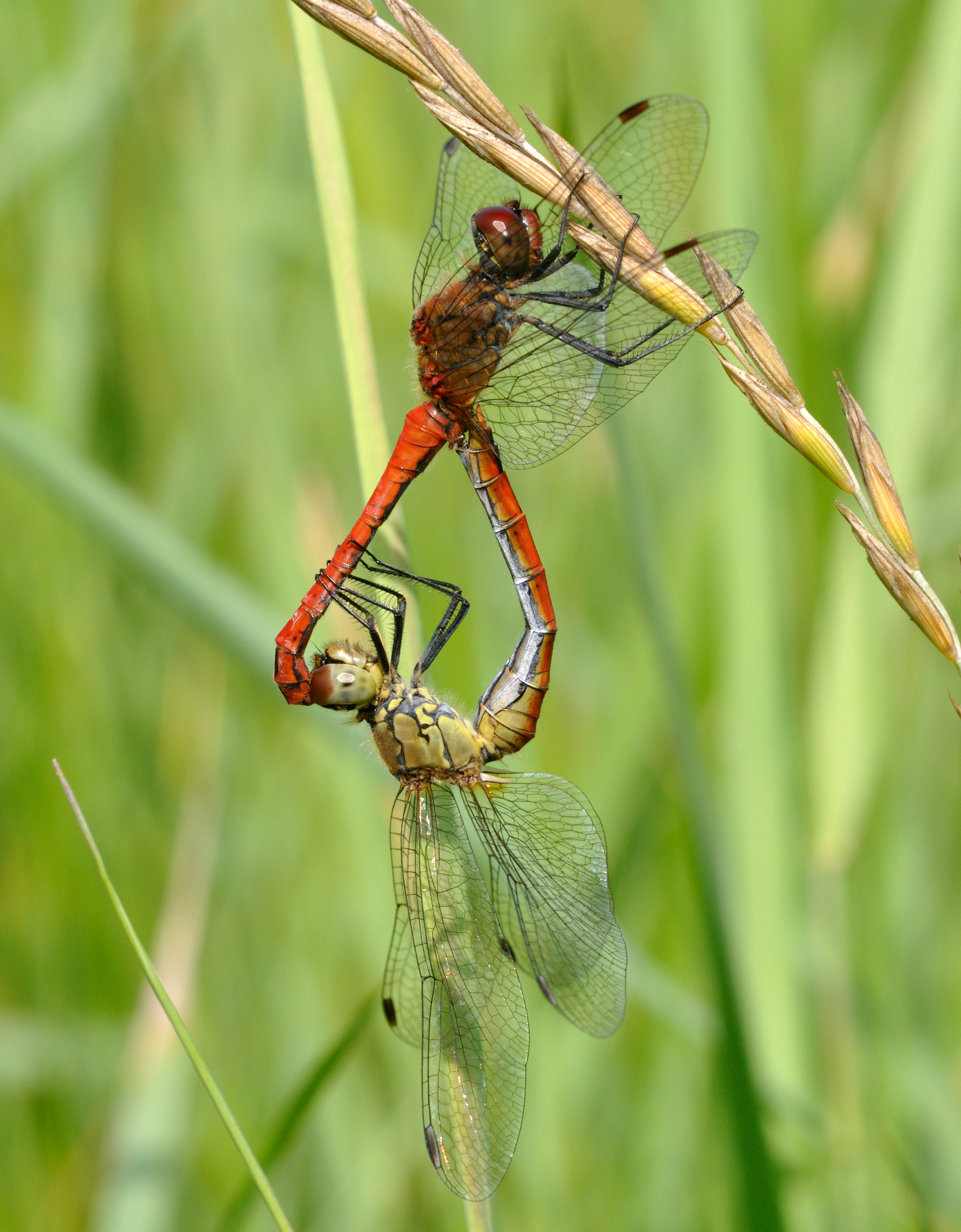
Mating pair

Jettisoning eggs

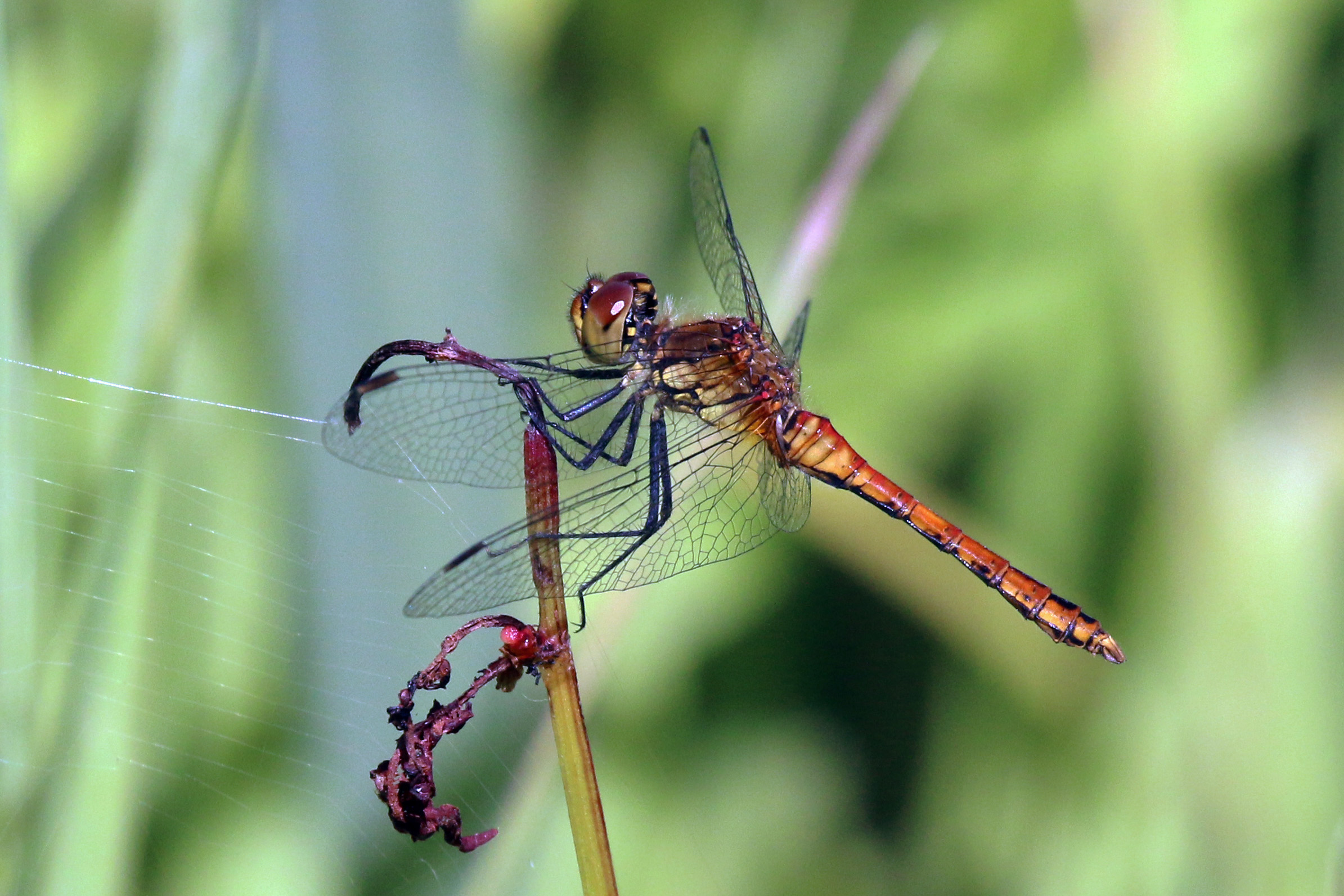
Newly emerged male

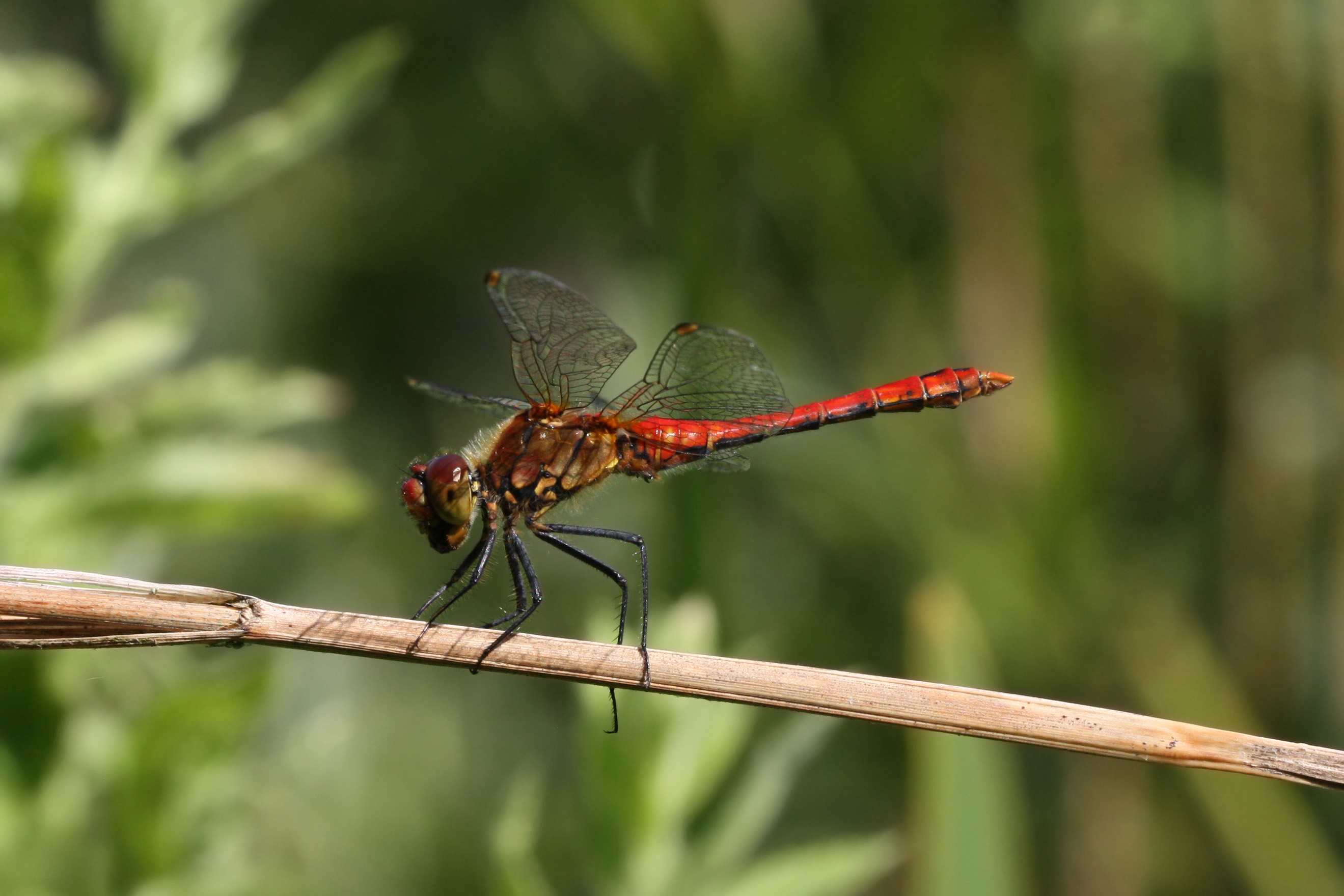
Almost adult male

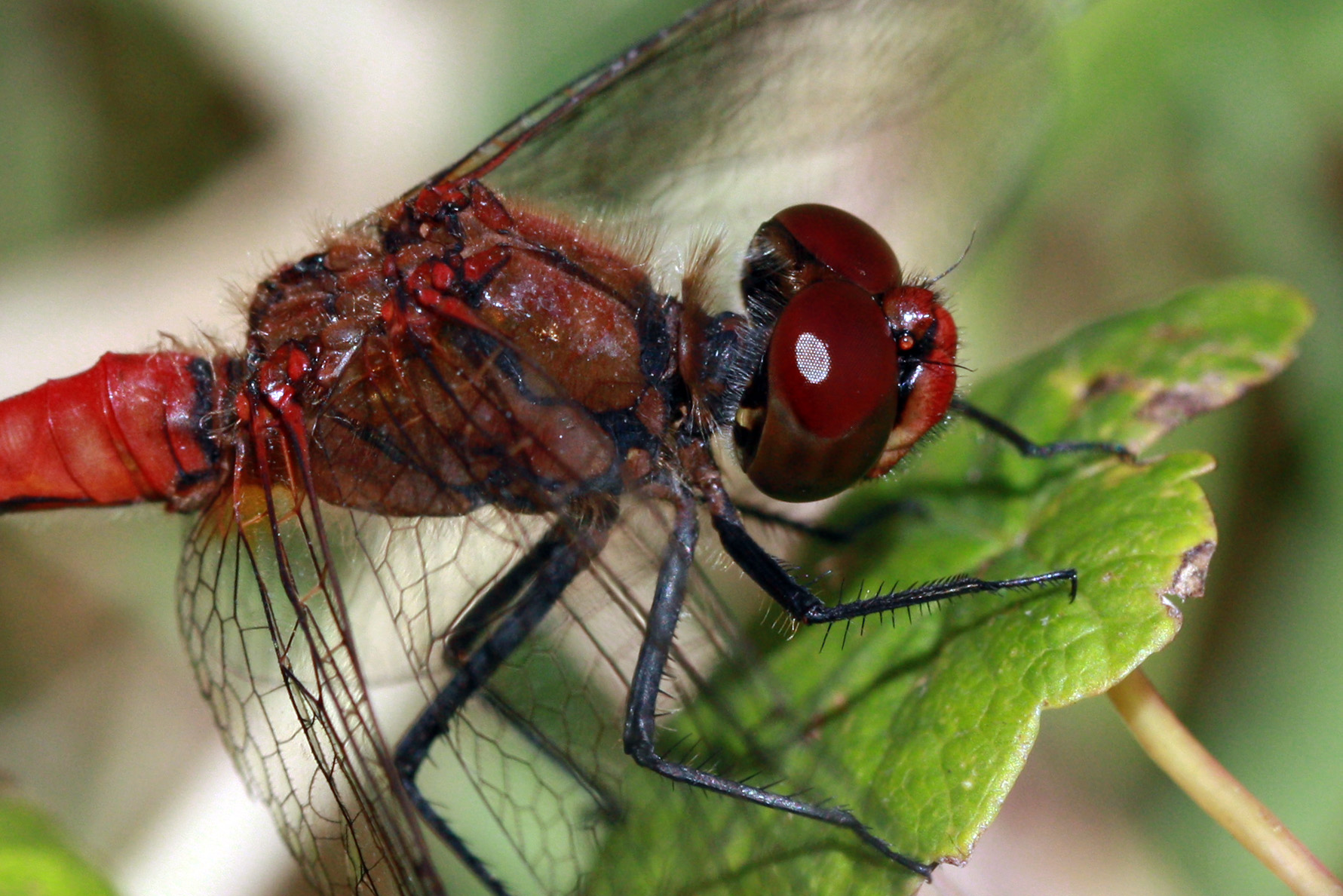
Adult male

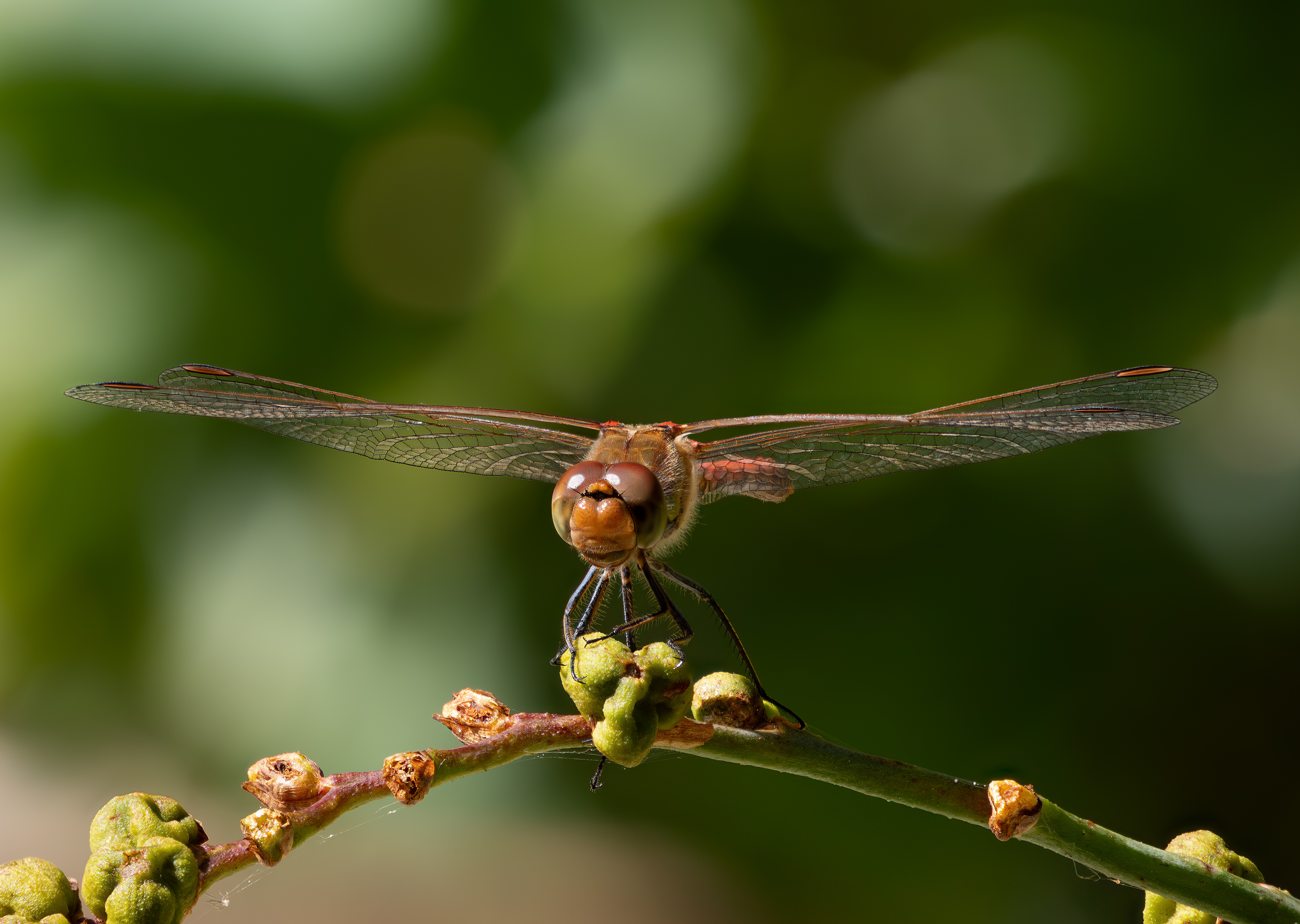
Adult male, head-on view

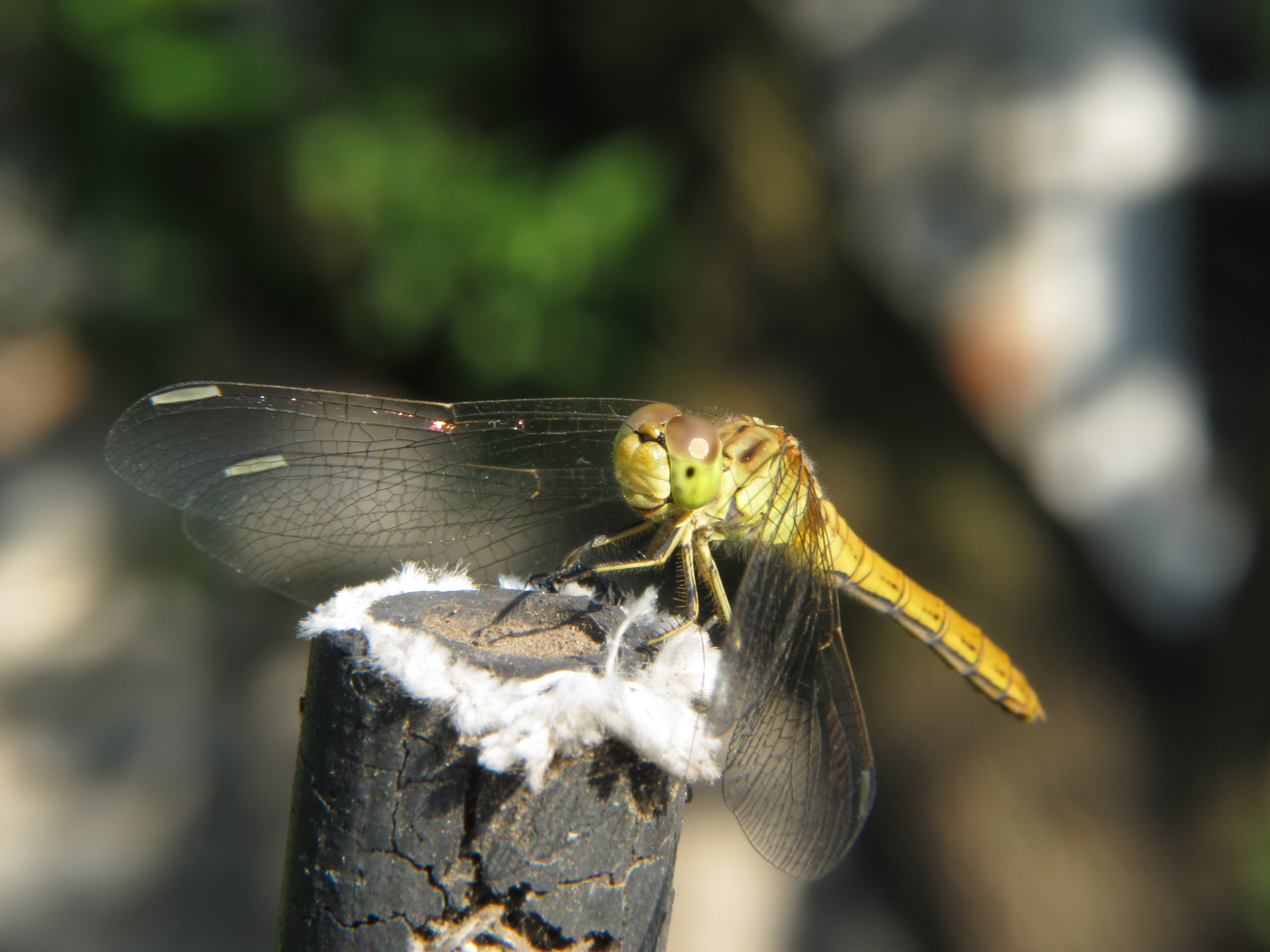
Almost adult female
