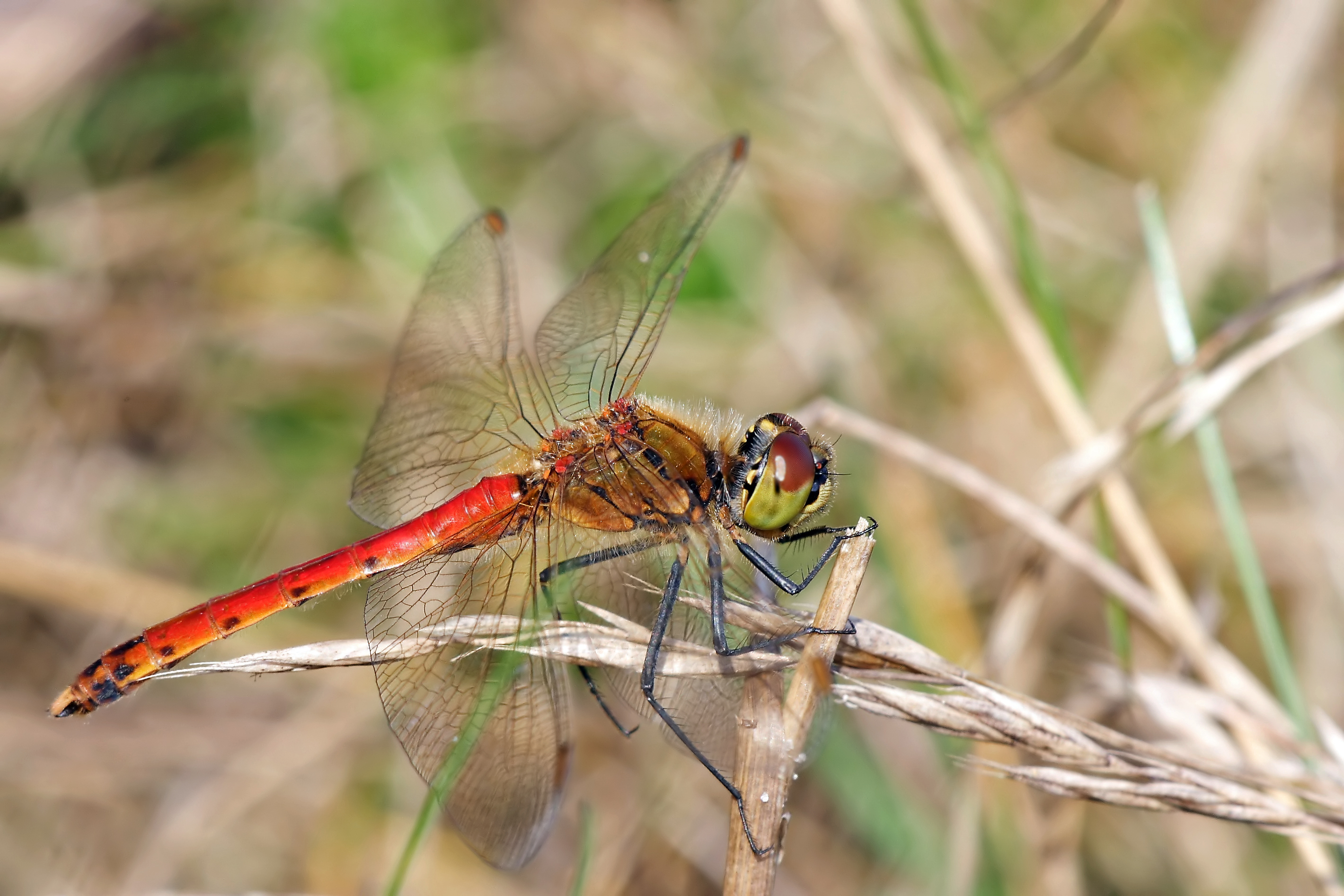
- Male

Conservation status
- Least Concern (IUCN 3.1)

Scientific classification
- Kingdom: Animalia
- Phylum: Arthropoda
- Class: Insecta
- Order: Odonata
- Infraorder: Anisoptera
- Family: Libellulidae
- Genus: Sympetrum
- Species: S. depressiusculum

Binomial name
- Sympetrum depressiusculum (Selys, 1841)

Synonyms
- Libellula depressiusculum Selys, 1841

= Sympetrum depressiusculum =

Species of insect

Sympetrum depressiusculum, the spotted darter, is a dragonfly species from the family Libellulidae, distributed across temperate parts of Eurasia.

== Description ==
Adults reach 29 to 34 mm in body length, of which 20–24 mm is abdomen. Males are distinguished by a flattened orange abdomen with a line of drop-shaped spots along each side and clubbed overall appearance - i.e. widest at the tip. They closely resemble males of the ruddy darter, which have more evenly flattened abdomen and noticeably darker pterostigmata.

Adults fly in the late summer. They are weak fliers.

== Habitat and distribution ==
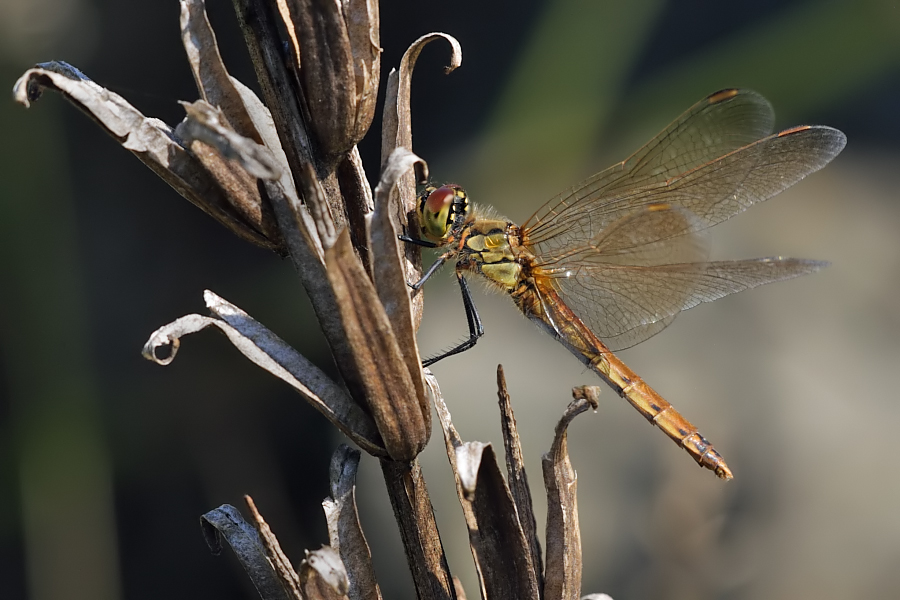
Female

It breeds in temporary water bodies, which dry out in the autumn and are re-filled in late spring when the snow melts. It can also colonize reservoirs and paddy fields where such water dynamic is maintained by humans. Furthermore, it is thought to have spread across some parts of Europe thanks to carp aquaculture which creates similar conditions.

The species is distributed across temperate parts of Eurasia from Western Europe to Japan, but is absent from steppes and deserts of Central Asia. The majority of the European population inhabits Alpine slopes and lowlands of east Germany and Poland. In the rest of the distribution range, it is only present locally. The European population is in decline due to intensification of land use and abandoning traditional agriculture, unlike populations of many other dragonfly species which have rebounded in the past few decades because of reduction in water pollution. It is thus regarded vulnerable in Europe.
