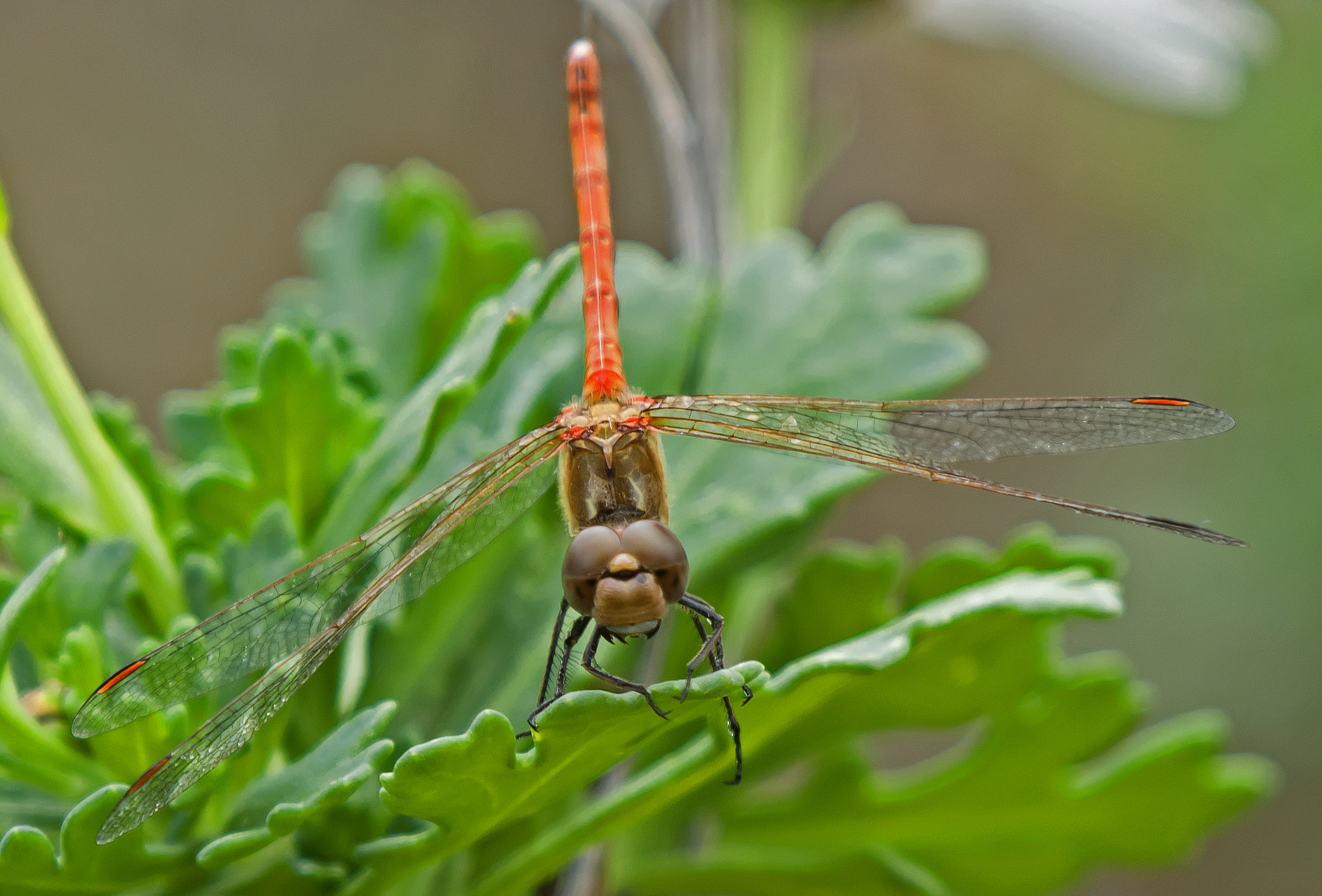

Conservation status
- Least Concern (IUCN 3.1)

Scientific classification
- Kingdom: Animalia
- Phylum: Arthropoda
- Class: Insecta
- Order: Odonata
- Infraorder: Anisoptera
- Family: Libellulidae
- Genus: Sympetrum
- Species: S. nigrifemur

Binomial name
- Sympetrum nigrifemur (Selys, 1884)

= Sympetrum nigrifemur =

Species of dragonfly

Sympetrum nigrifemur, the island darter, is a species of dragonfly in the family Libellulidae. It is endemic to the Canary Islands and to Madeira. Its natural habitats are rivers, intermittent rivers, intermittent freshwater marshes, and ponds.

Sympetrum nigrifemur may be a subspecies of common darter, S. striolatum.
