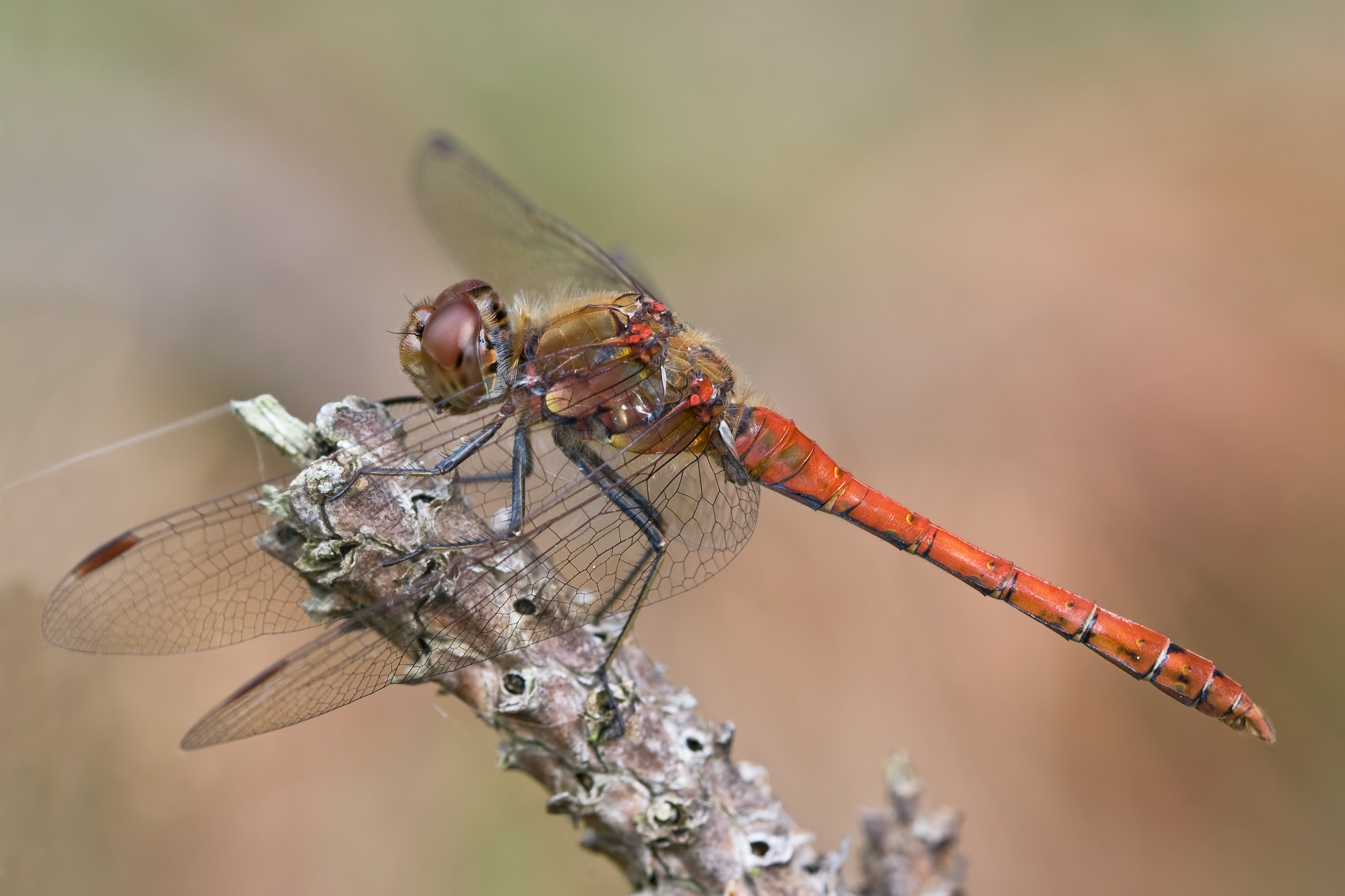
- Male
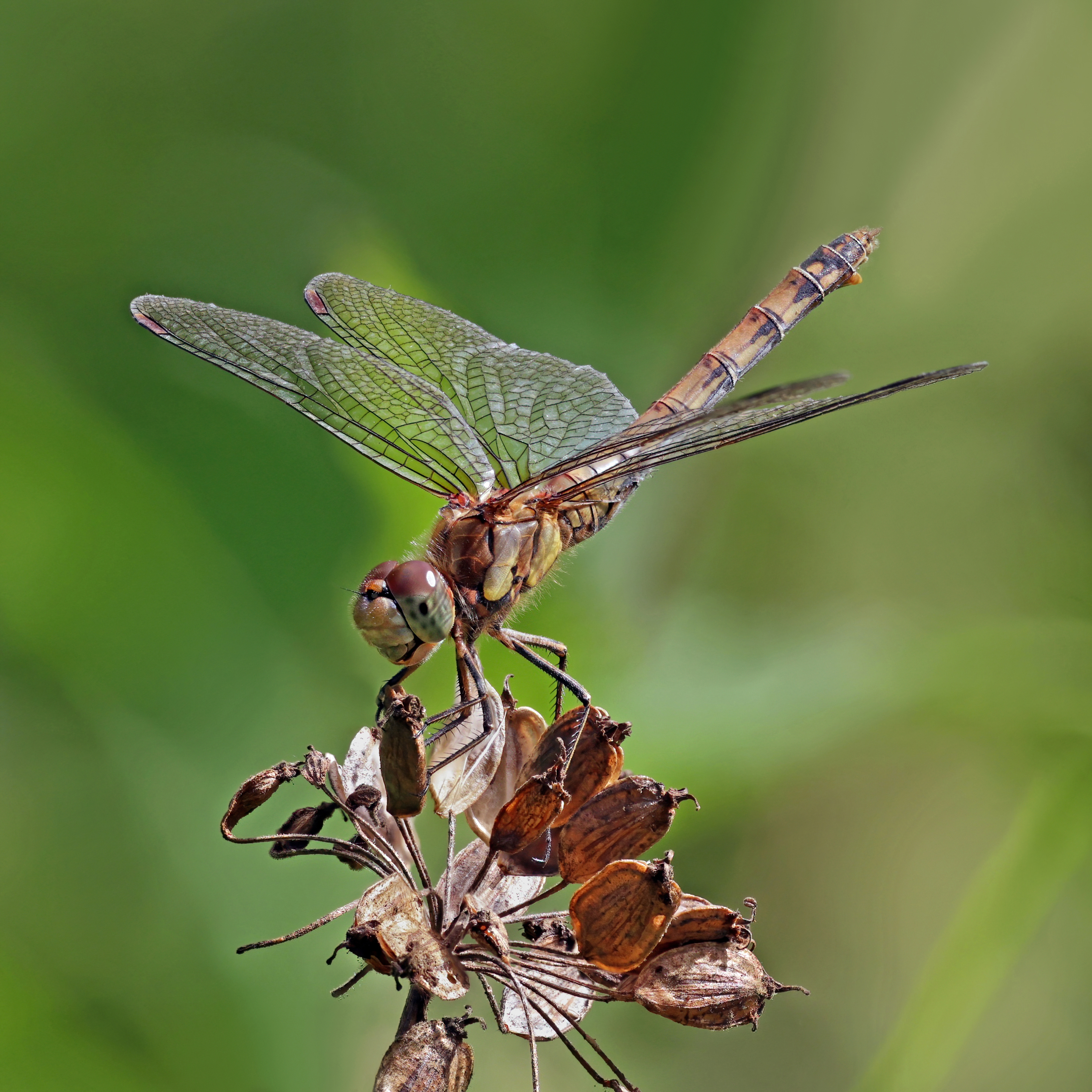
- Female

Conservation status
- Least Concern (IUCN 3.1)

Scientific classification
- Kingdom: Animalia
- Phylum: Arthropoda
- Clade: Pancrustacea
- Class: Insecta
- Order: Odonata
- Infraorder: Anisoptera
- Superfamily: Libelluloidea
- Family: Libellulidae
- Genus: Sympetrum
- Species: S. striolatum

Binomial name
- Sympetrum striolatum (Linnaeus, 1758)
- Range of S. striolatum

= Common darter =

Species of dragonfly

The common darter (Sympetrum striolatum) is a dragonfly of the family Libellulidae native to Eurasia. It is one of the most common dragonflies in Europe, occurring in a wide variety of water bodies, though with a preference for breeding in still water such as ponds and lakes. In the south of its range adults are on the wing all year round.

== Description ==
Sympetrum species are not easy to tell apart and in most areas more than one Sympetrum species will occur. Females and teneral individuals have light yellow thorax and abdomen. Males turn red as they mature. Females darken with age, becoming a dark chocolate brown, and sometimes develop a blue colouration to the bottom of the abdomen. The wings also develop a brown tinge with age. In all cases the legs have a cream or yellow stripe on a black background - this is a diagnostic feature of this species. The pterostigma of the females can be red, blue, pale blue or brown.

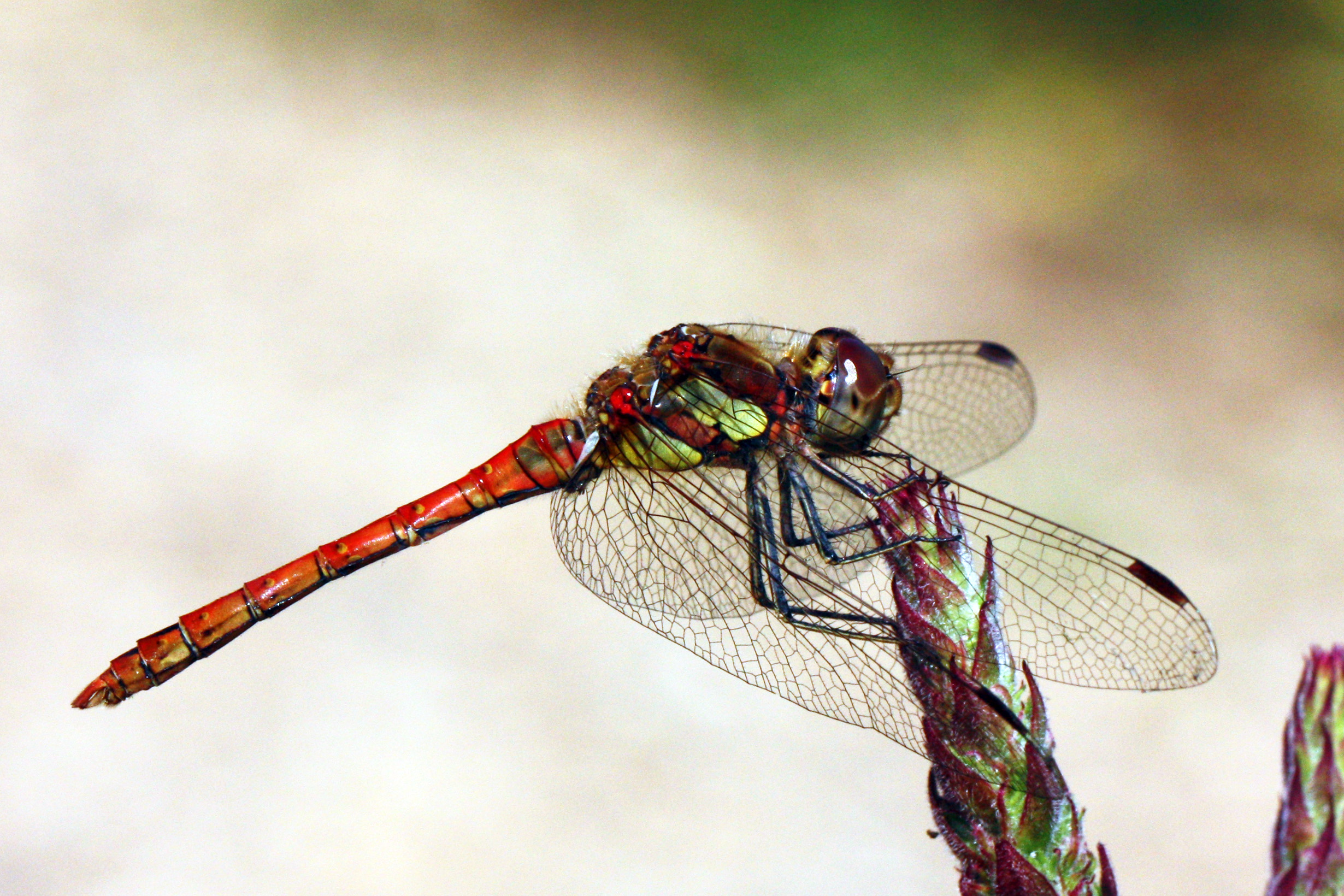
immature male

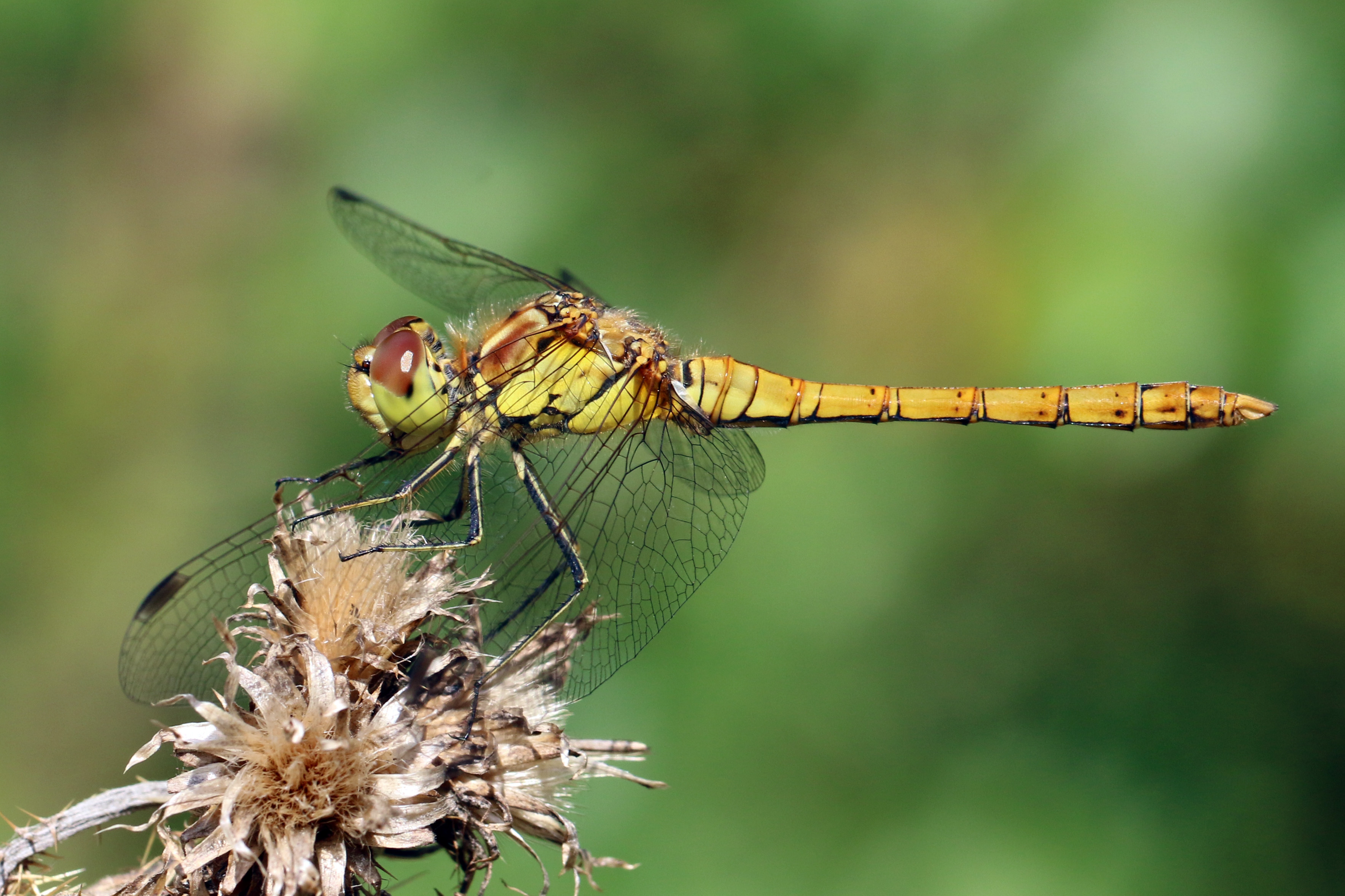
male (yellow abdomen and brown pterostigma)

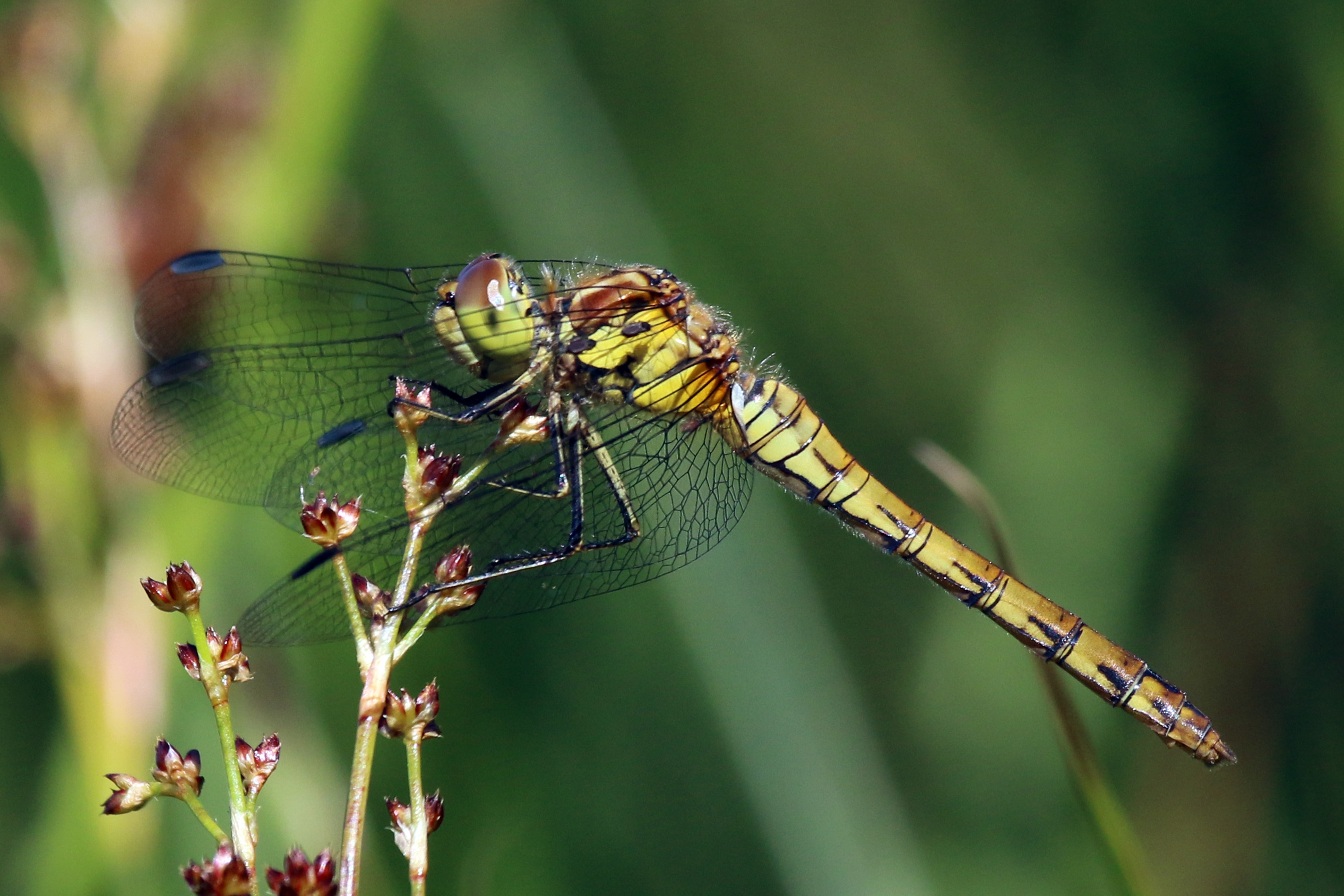
female (yellow abdomen and blue pterostigma)

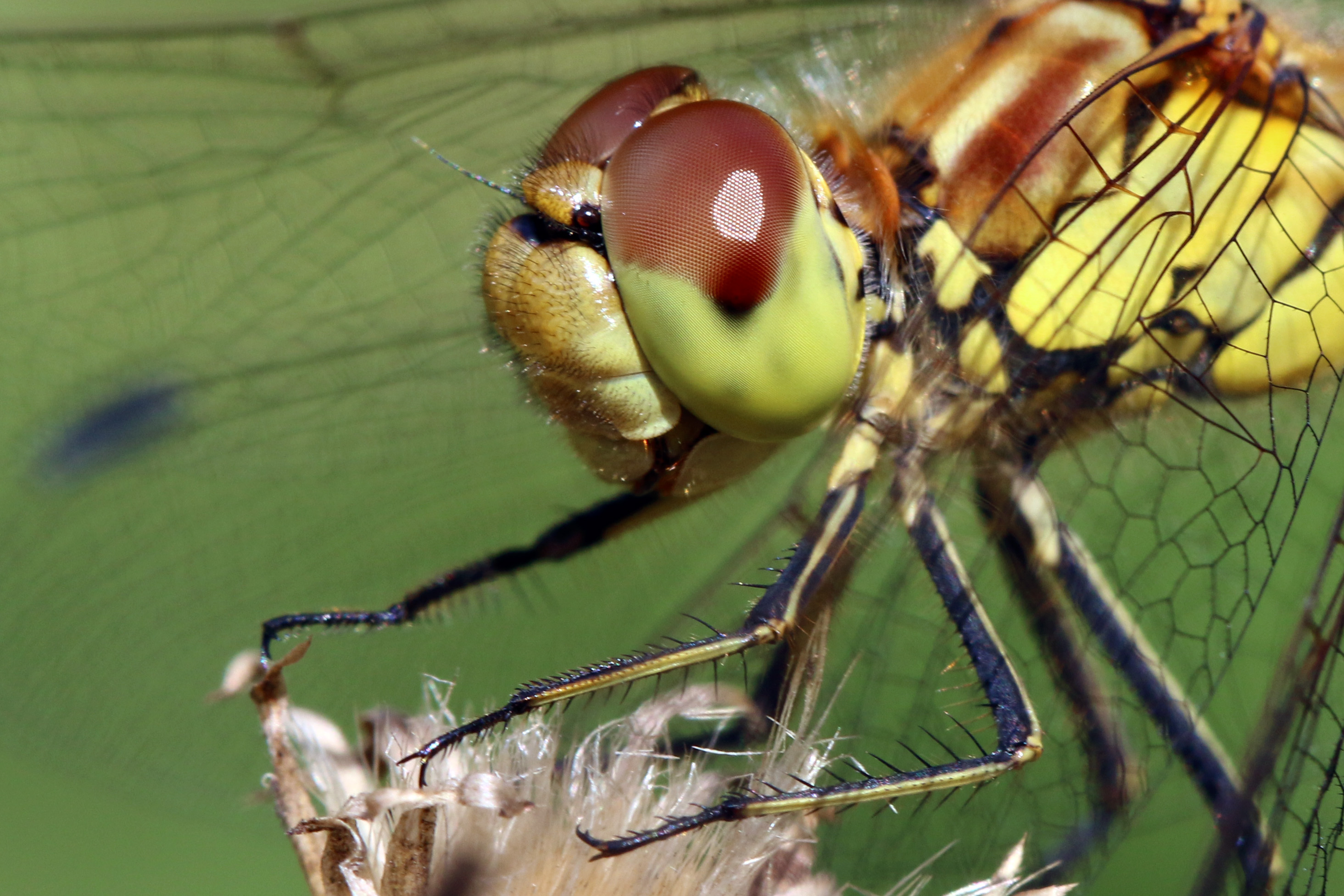
female

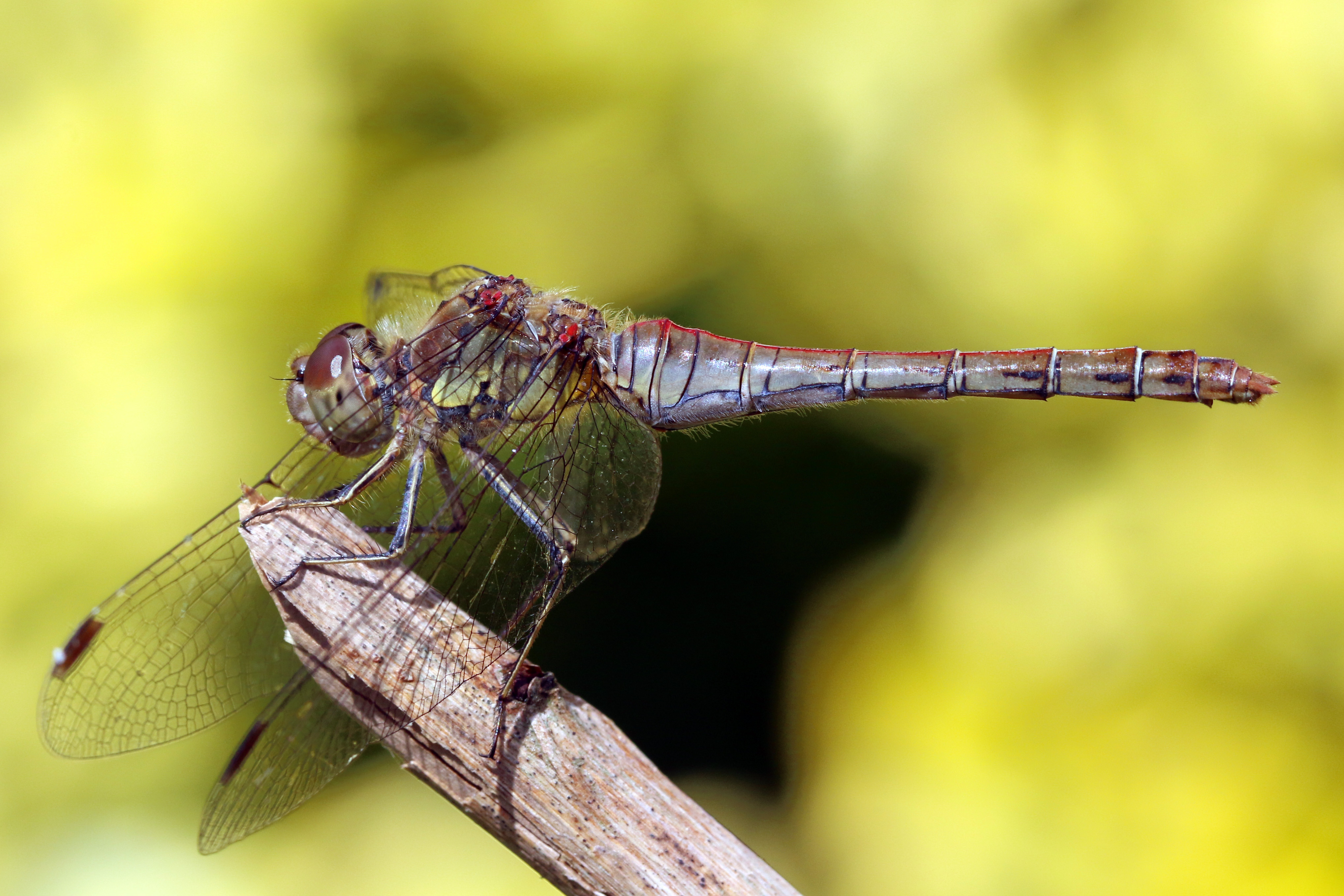
mature female (red abdomen)

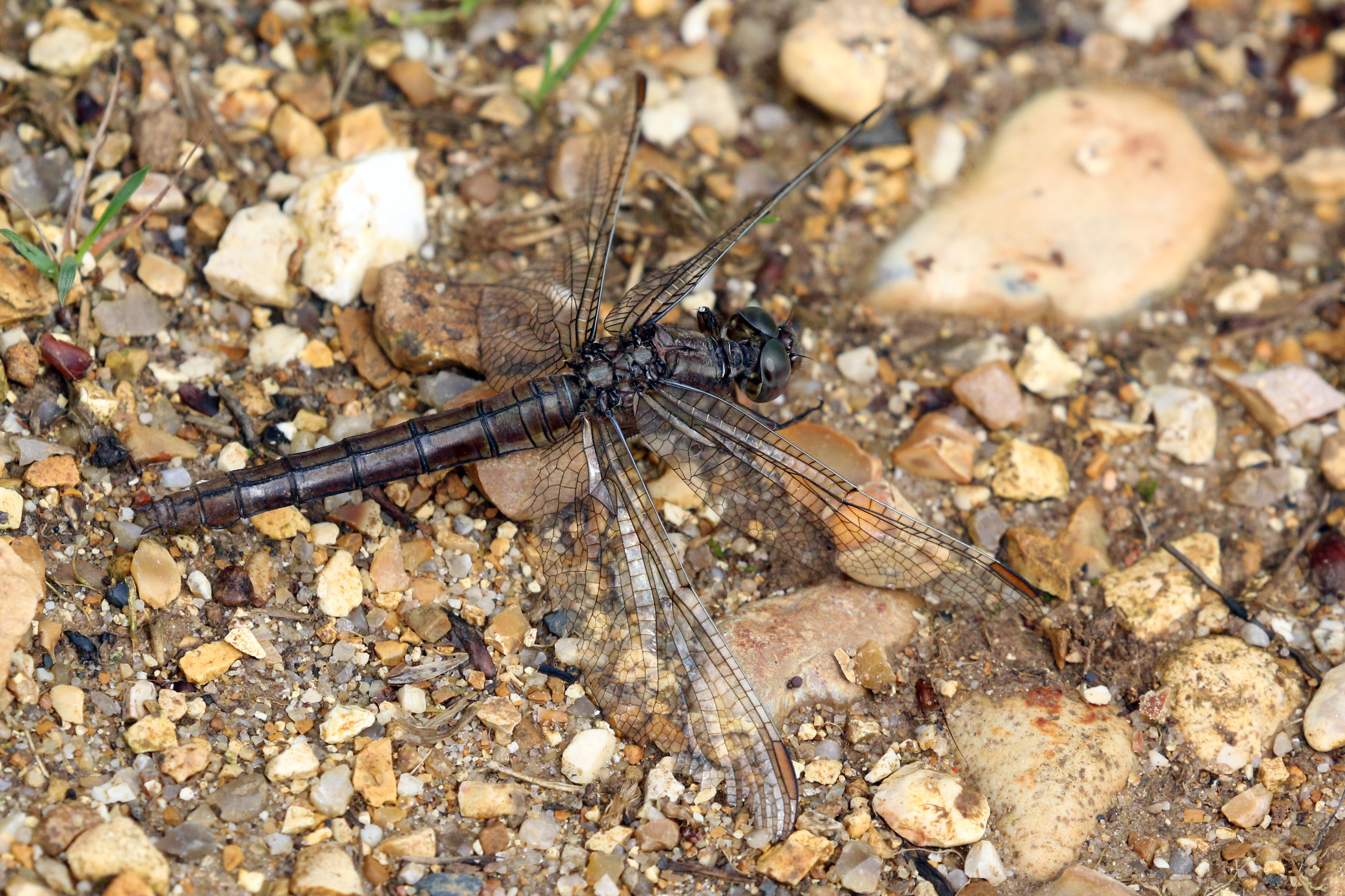
mature female (brown abdomen)

Close-up

Close-up of synthorax

Close-up of abdomen

== Behaviour ==
Adults can be seen on the wing all year round in southern Europe but in northern regions they occur from June to November.

This small dragonfly is seen in a wide variety of habitats, including lakes, ponds, canals and slow-flowing rivers. They are ambush predators, waiting on a prominent perch - such as a leaf or the top of a gate, until prey fly past, whereupon they will fly after it. They are territorial on breeding waters, often attempting to chase much bigger dragonflies away such as southern hawkers. This habit of repeatedly returning to a sunny spot allows you to easily predict where they are going to land, which is why it is one of the easiest dragonflies to photograph.

In suitable hunting areas away from water, however, they are not territorial: large numbers may assemble - groups of several hundred in a single field have been recorded - and lines of insects can be seen along the top of field gates.

Eggs are not laid, but broadcast from the air: the male holds the female in tandem and swings her down and forward over water. At the furthest point of the arc the female releases some of her eggs to fall on the water.

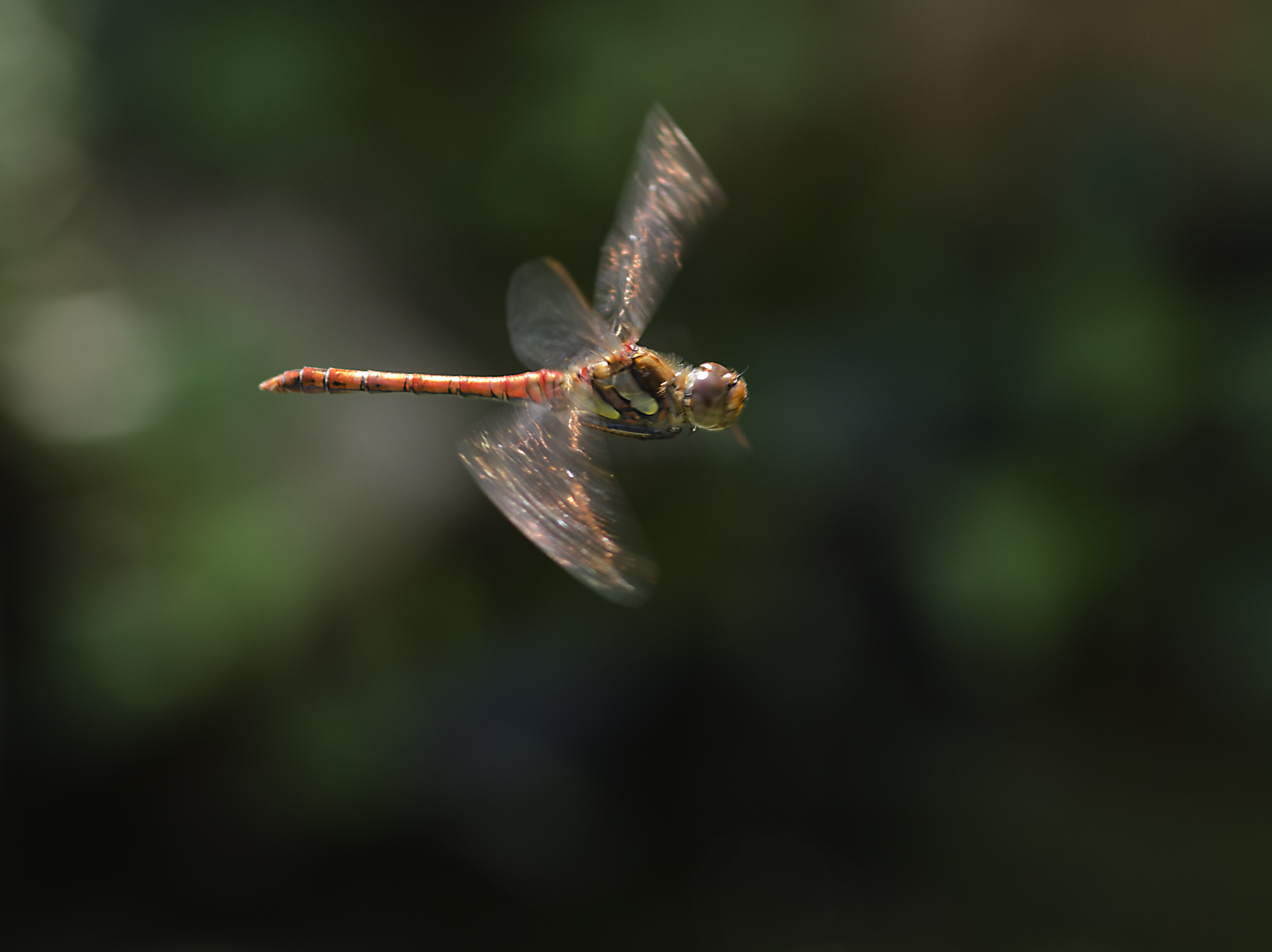
in flight

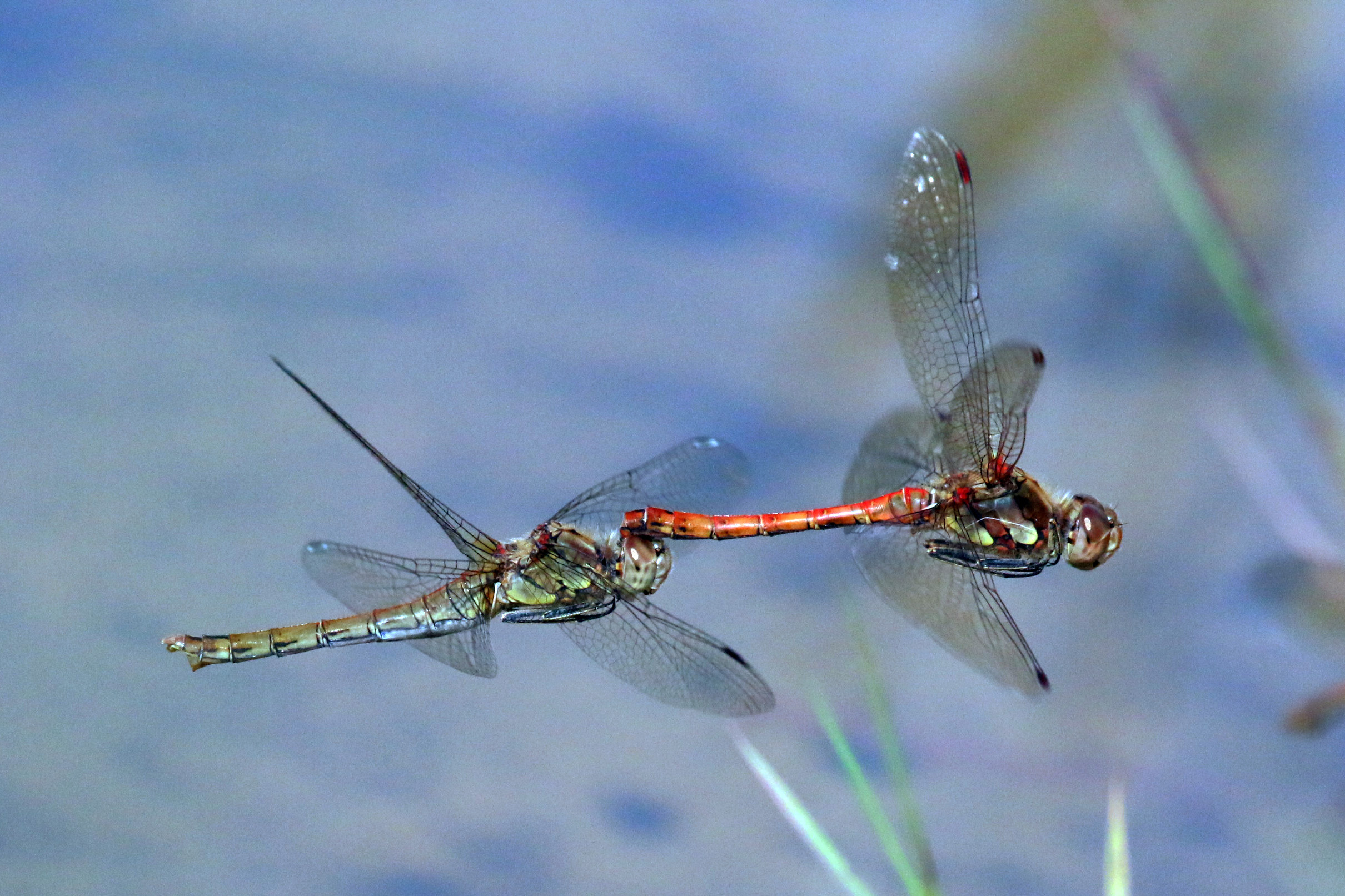
in flight in tandem

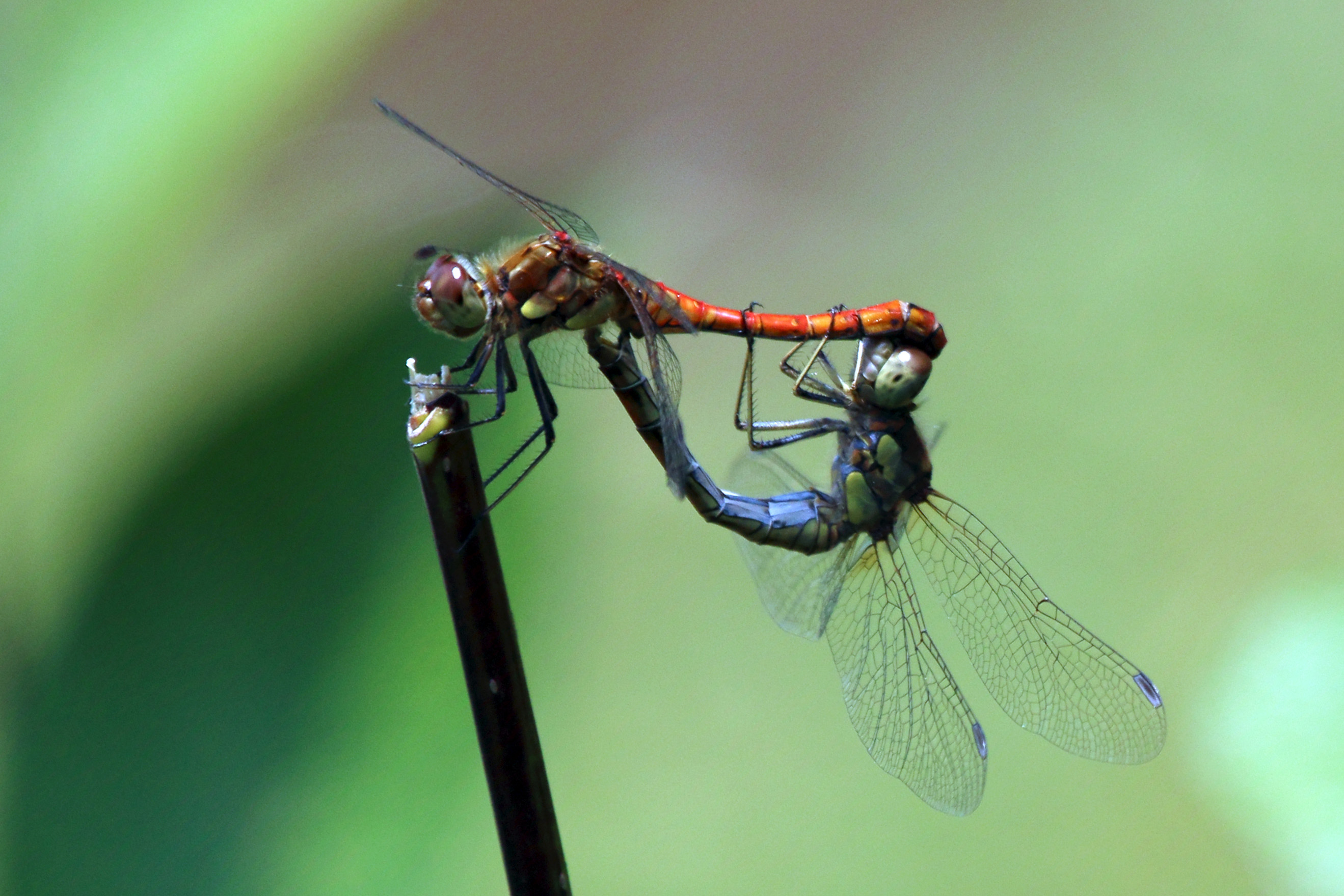
mating (female blue abdomen and blue pterostigma)

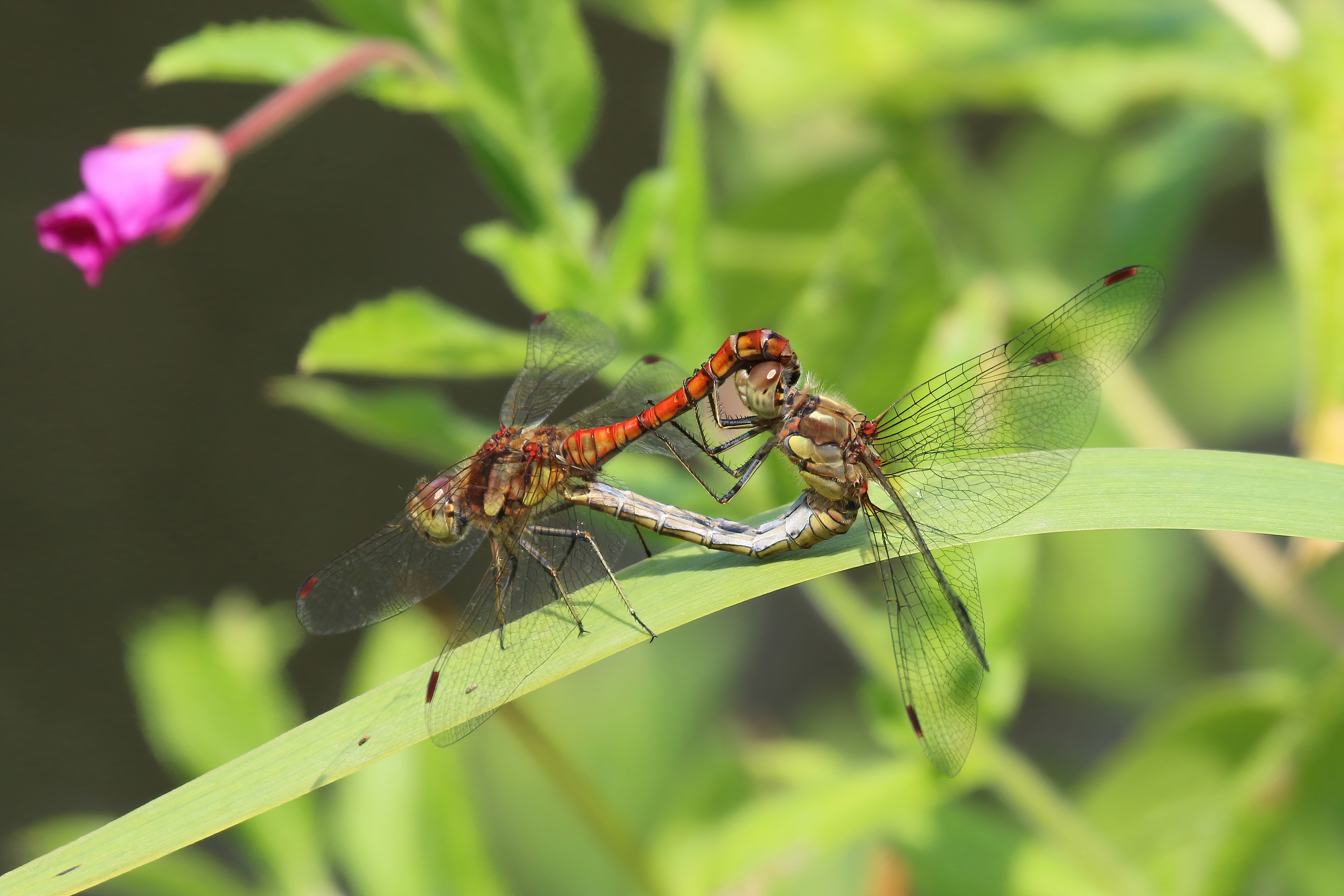
mating (female blue abdomen and red pterostigma)

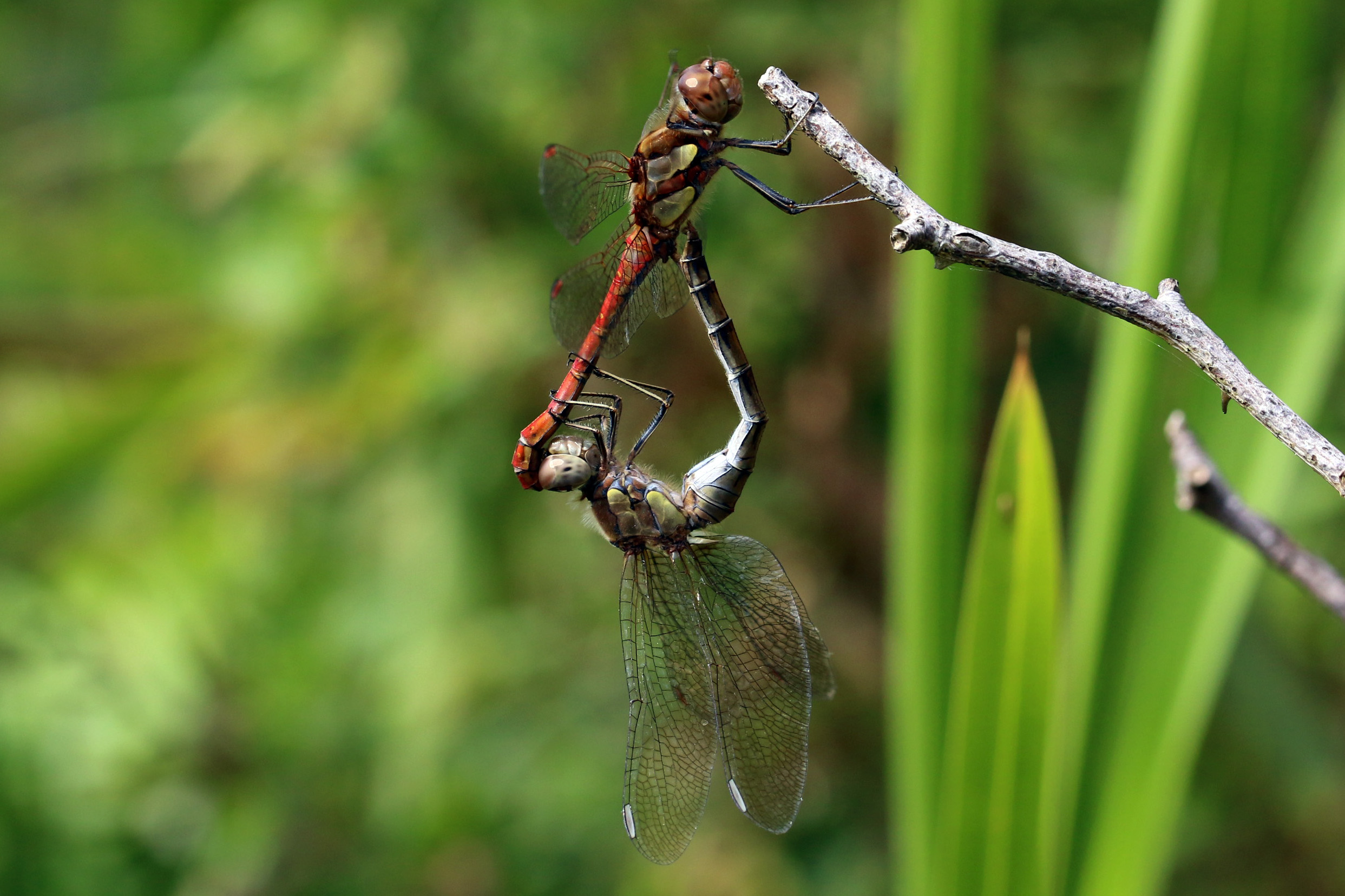
mating (female with pale blue pterostigma)

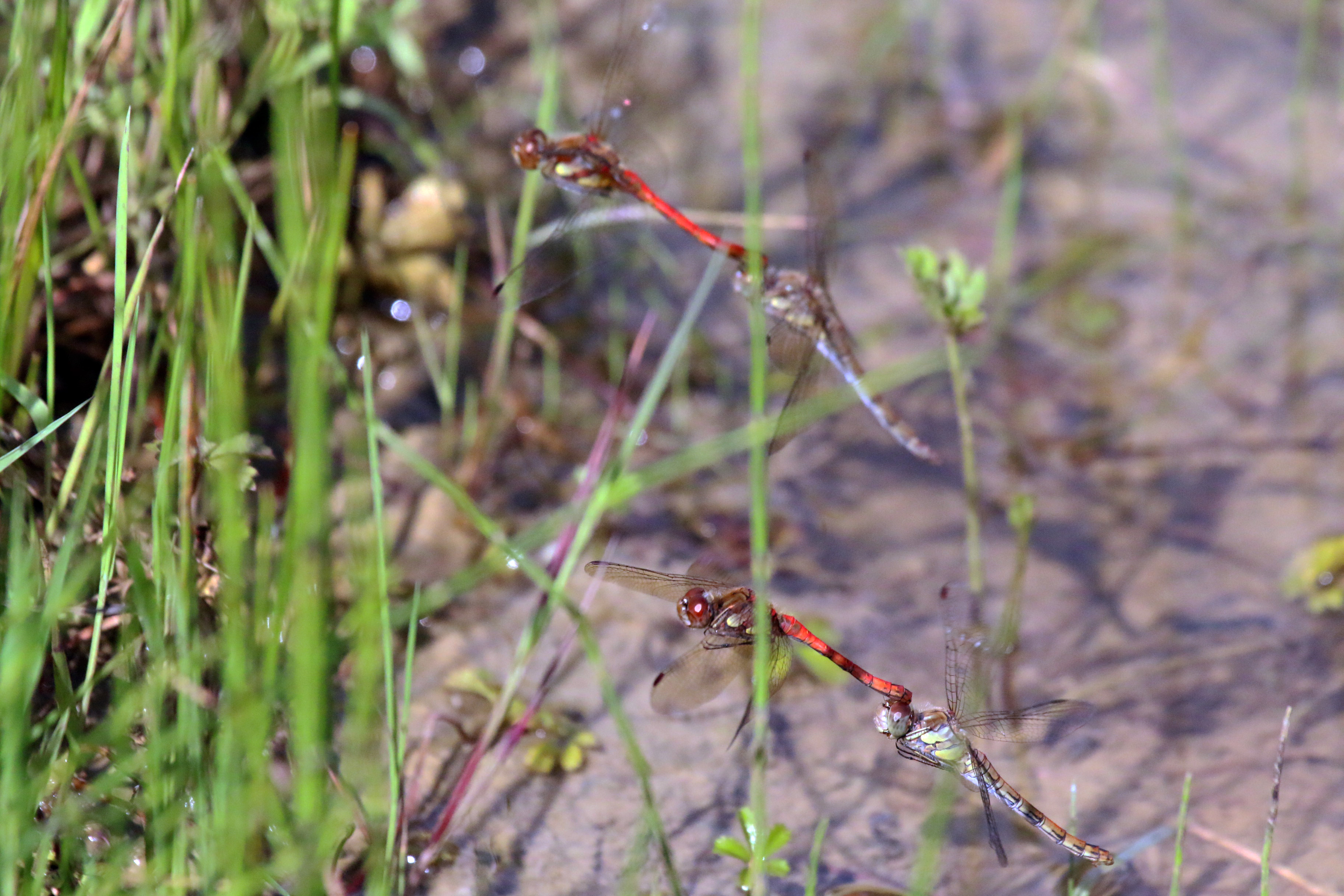
two pairs ovipositing

male hunting

== Conservation status ==
This is one of the most abundant dragonflies in Europe, and populations show no evidence of decline.

== Highland darter ==
A taxon named the highland darter used to be considered a separate species, Sympetrum nigrescens. It is found in Ireland, Scotland and Norway. It may be the same taxon as the island darter, formally S. nigrifemur, both being a subspecies of S. striolatum.
