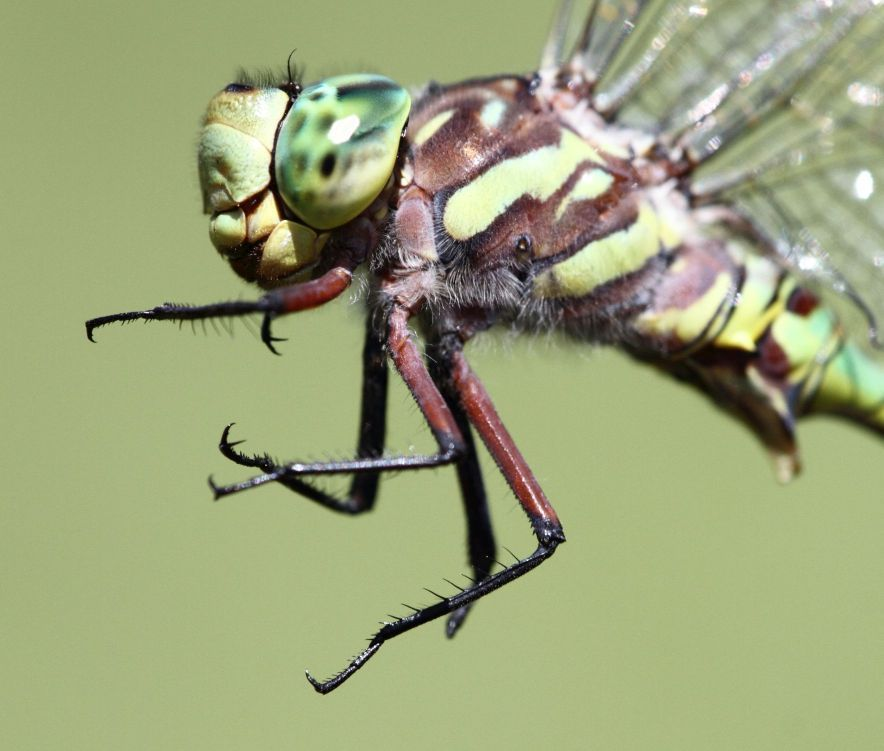
- male

Conservation status
- Least Concern (IUCN 3.1)

Scientific classification
- Kingdom: Animalia
- Phylum: Arthropoda
- Class: Insecta
- Order: Odonata
- Infraorder: Anisoptera
- Family: Aeshnidae
- Genus: Pinheyschna
- Species: P. subpupillata

Binomial name
- Pinheyschna subpupillata (McLachlan, 1896)

Synonyms
- Aeshna subpupillata

= Pinheyschna subpupillata =

Species of dragonfly

Pinheyschna subpupillata, the stream hawker, is a species of dragonfly in the family Aeshnidae.

== Distribution ==
This hawker is endemic to southern Africa; it is common in much of southern and eastern South Africa, and is also found in parts of Mozambique and Zimbabwe.

== Habitat ==
Its natural habitats include fast-flowing streams and rivers in montane and upland settings. Rivers and streams with densely vegetated banks (both grassy and bushy) are preferred.

== Description ==
A large dragonfly (length 61–64 mm; wingspan 87–91 mm). The eyes are green and the face deep yellow to greenish yellow; the upper frons has a central black spot within a yellow ring. The thorax is brown with green stripes, and the abdomen green with brown markings. The wings are slightly smoky with brown and yellow veins and reddish-brown to yellow-brown pterostigmata.

== Similar species ==
Pinheyschna subpupillata is similar to Zosteraeschna minuscula and Zosteraeschna usambarica, but the latter species have browner abdomens, and long green dorsal stripes on the thorax. The black marking on the upper frons of Zosteraeschna minuscula is shaped like an anchor, and that of Zosteraeschna usambarica like a pentagon, rather than the rounded spot of the stream hawker. Pinheyschna subpupillata males also differ in having secondary gentilia that project conspicuously from the second segment of the abdomen (S2), and lack the blue saddle (also S2) of Zosteraeschna males.

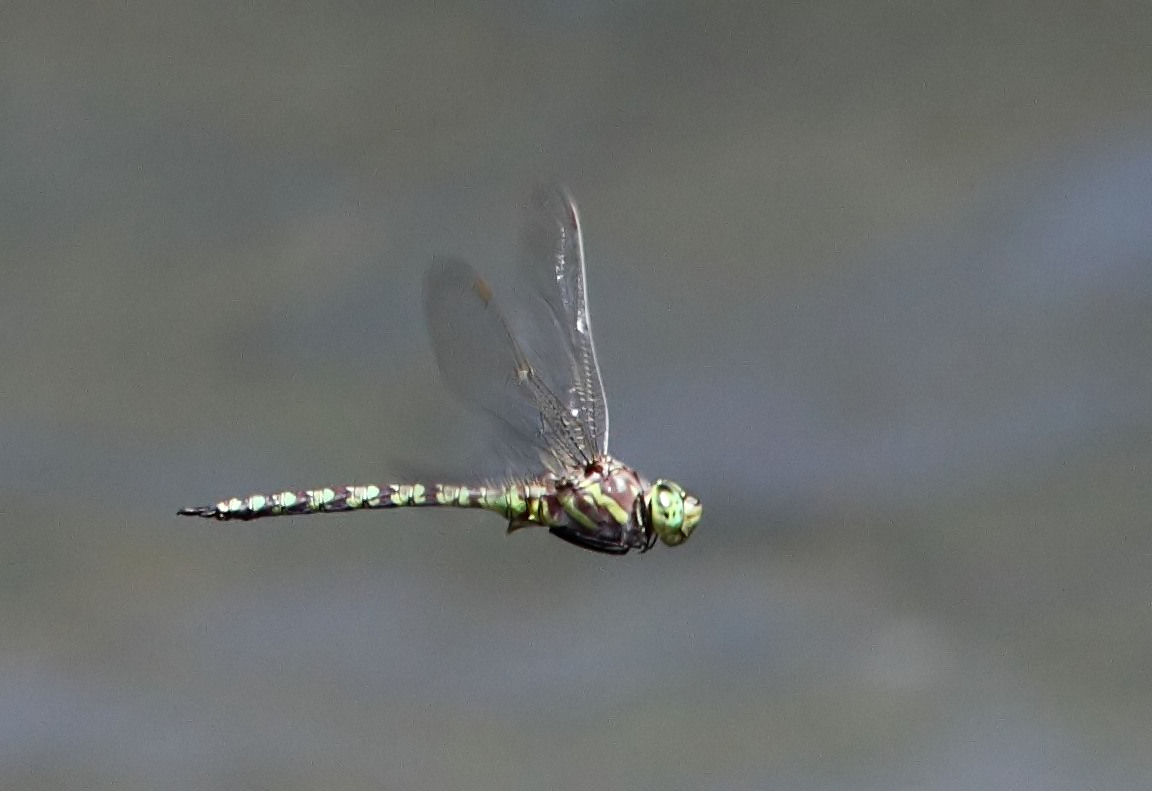
Male in flight

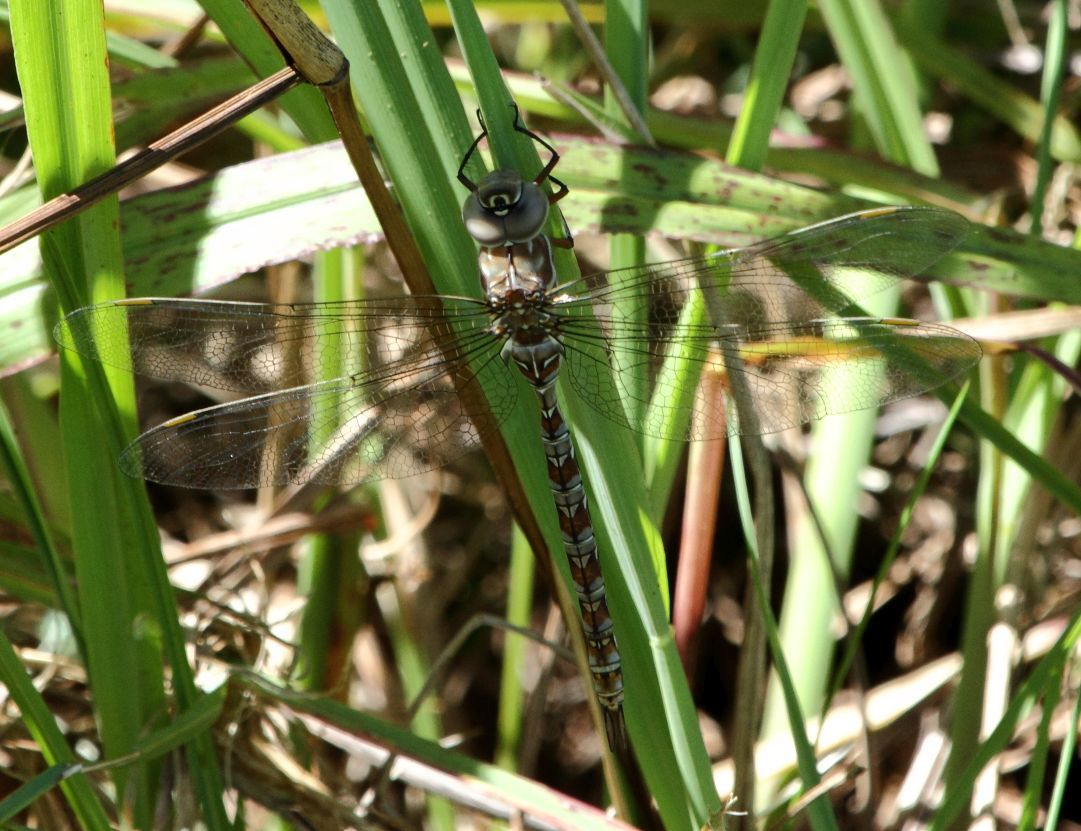
Male perched

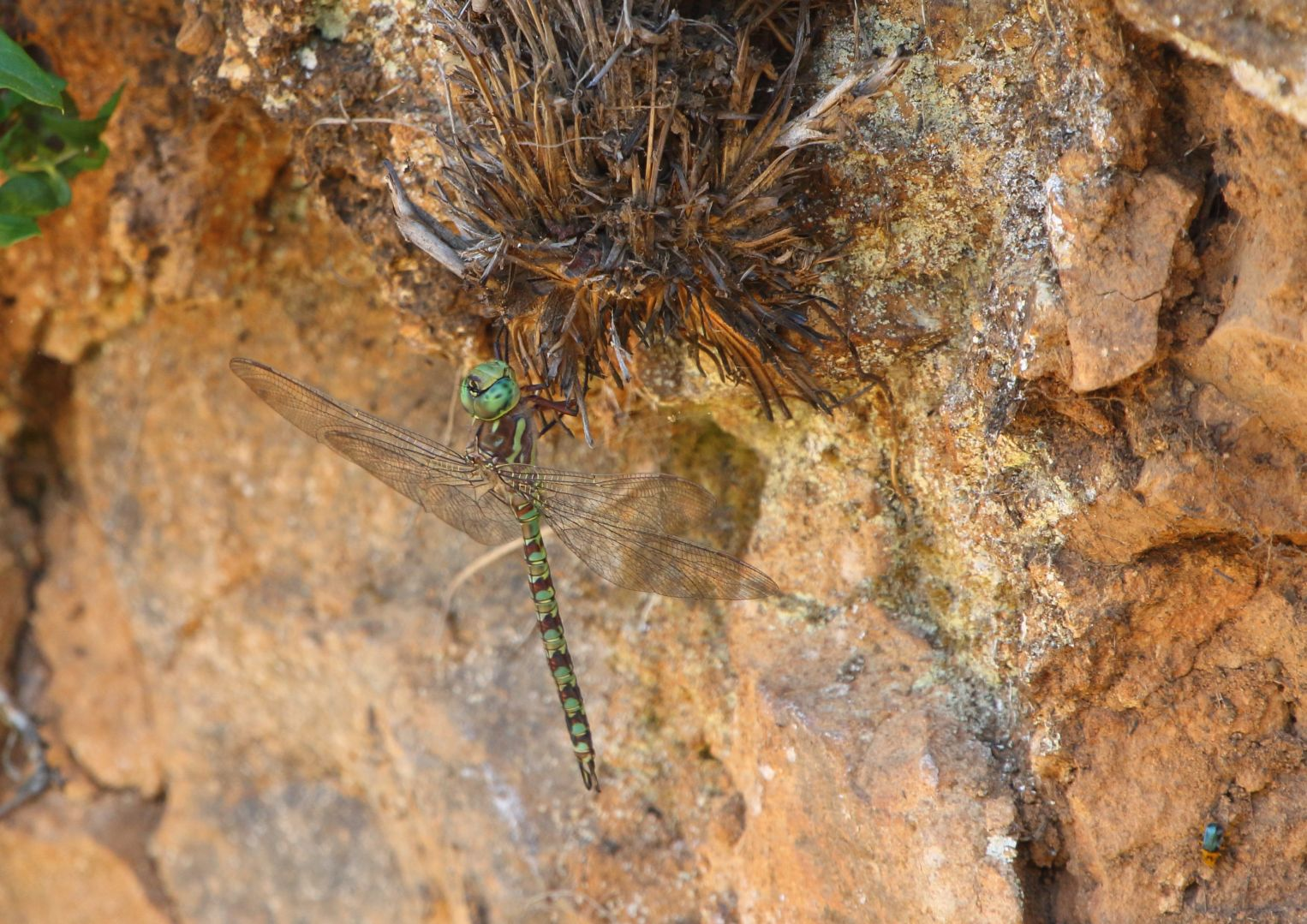
Male

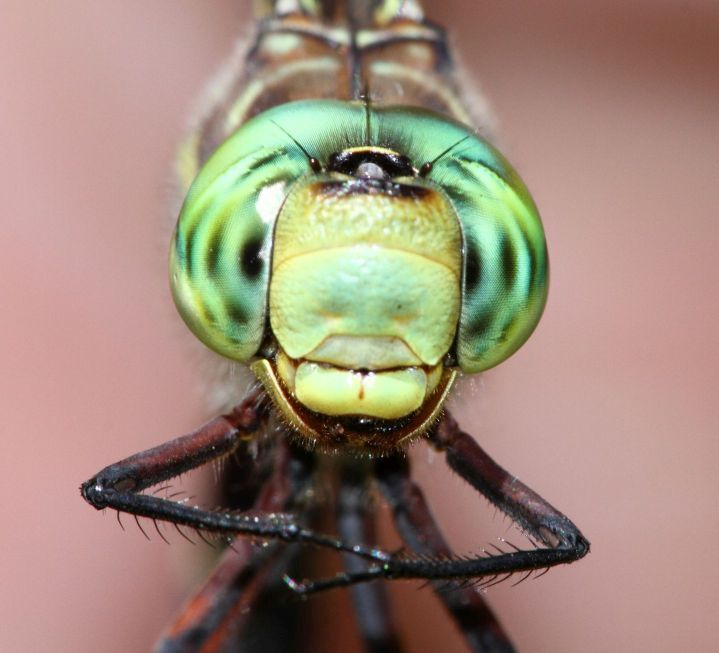
Male face

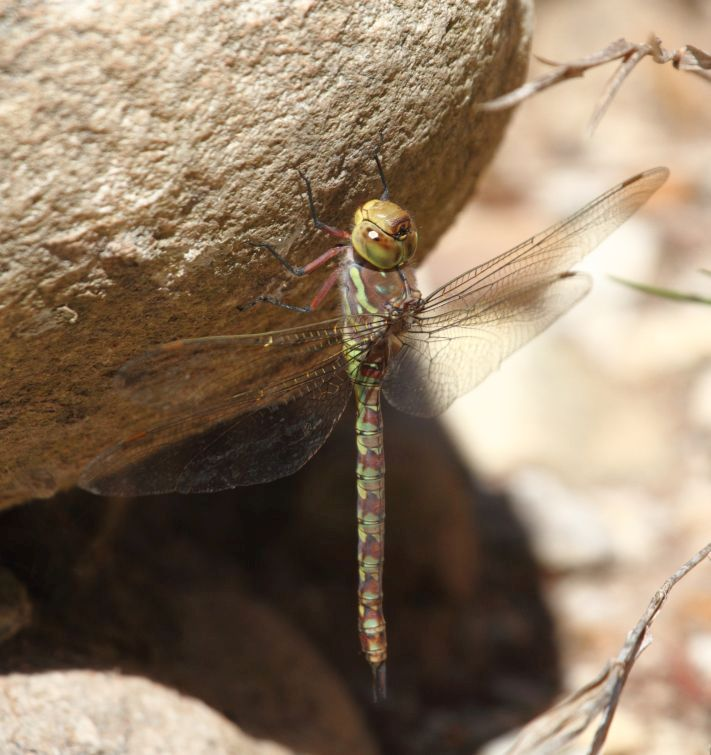
Female

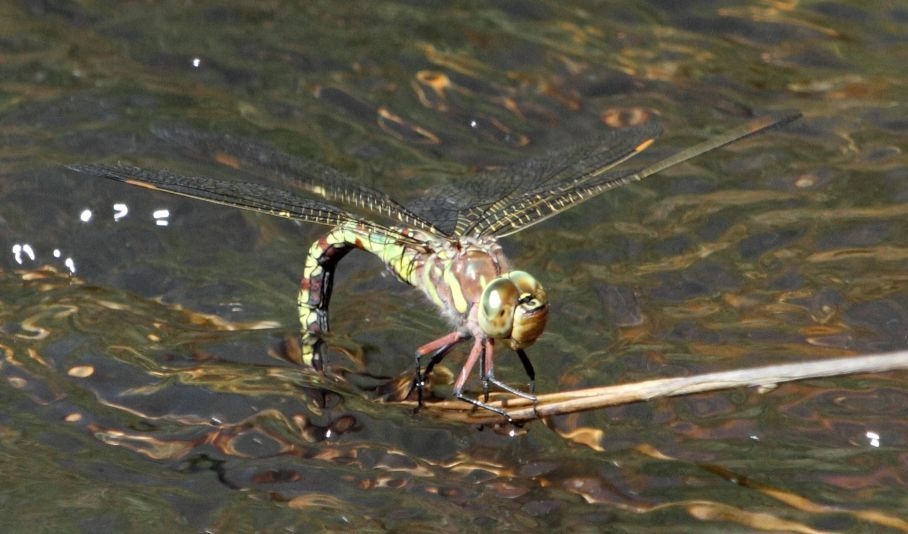
Female ovipositing

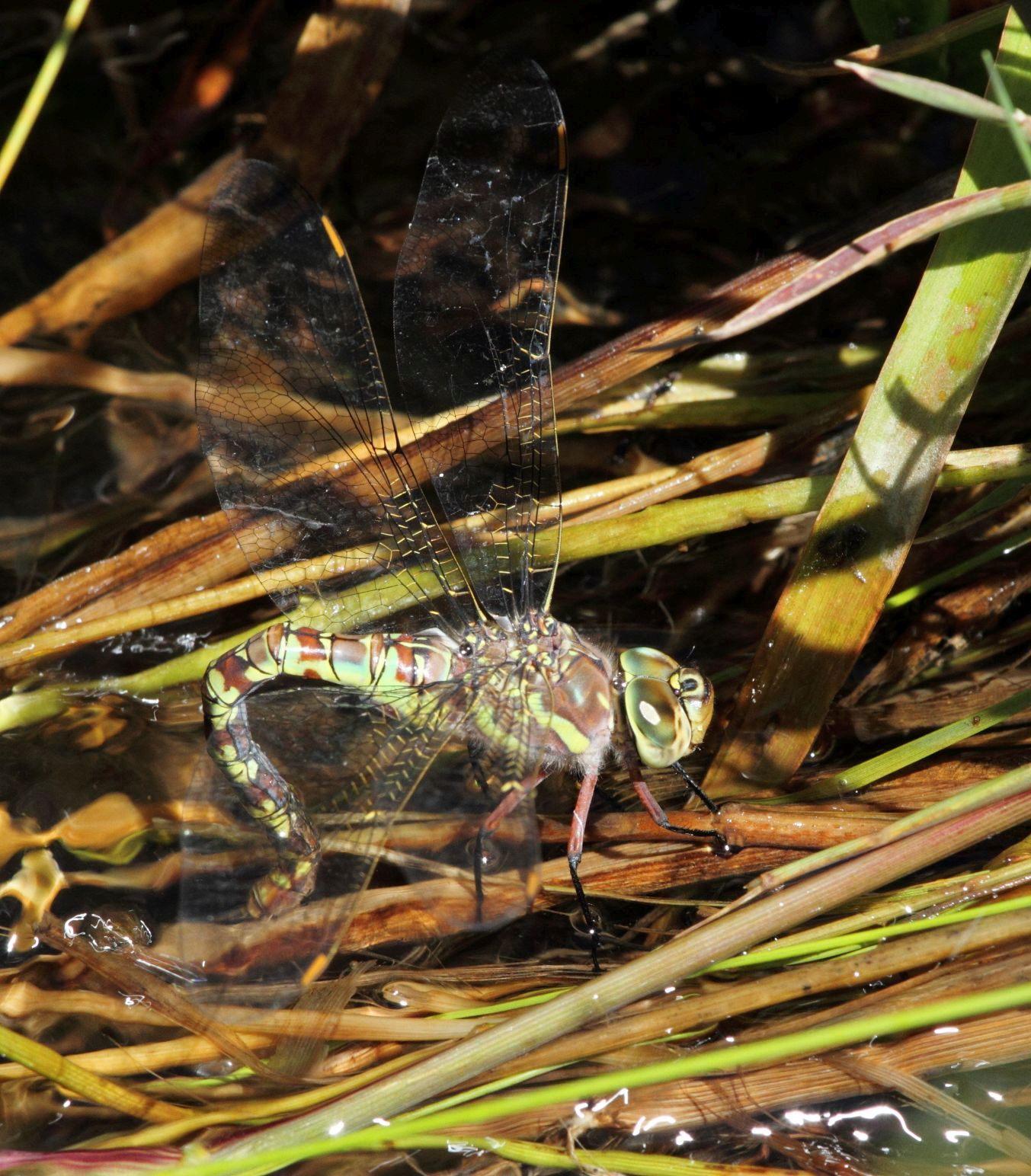
Female ovipositing

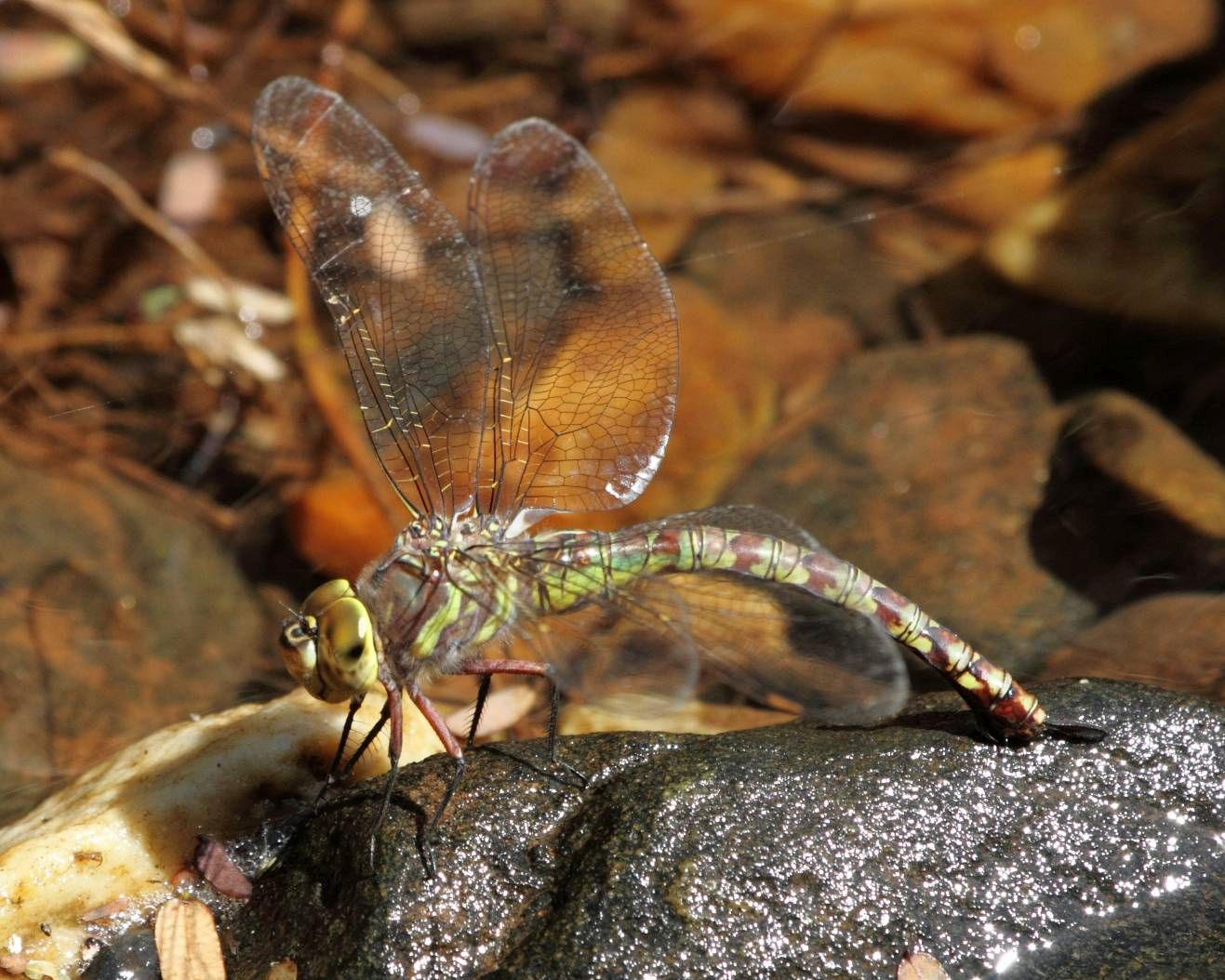
Female ovipositing
