= Pinheyschna yemenensis =

Conservation status
- Vulnerable (IUCN 3.1)

Scientific classification
- Kingdom: Animalia
- Phylum: Arthropoda
- Class: Insecta
- Order: Odonata
- Infraorder: Anisoptera
- Family: Aeshnidae
- Genus: Pinheyschna
- Species: P. yemenensis

Binomial name
- Pinheyschna yemenensis (Waterston, 1984)

Synonyms
- Aeshna yemenensis

Species of dragonfly

Pinheyschna yemenensis is a species of dragonfly in the family Aeshnidae. It is endemic to Yemen, where its natural habitat is mountain streams above 2000 m above sea level. It is threatened by a loss of this habitat.
