= Pinheyschna meruensis =

Conservation status
- Least Concern (IUCN 3.1)

Scientific classification
- Kingdom: Animalia
- Phylum: Arthropoda
- Class: Insecta
- Order: Odonata
- Infraorder: Anisoptera
- Family: Aeshnidae
- Genus: Pinheyschna
- Species: P. meruensis

Binomial name
- Pinheyschna meruensis Sjöstedt, 1909

Species of dragonfly

Pinheyschna meruensis is a species of dragonfly in the family Aeshnidae. It is found in Kenya, Tanzania, and Uganda. Its natural habitats are subtropical or tropical dry forests, subtropical or tropical moist lowland forests, subtropical or tropical dry shrubland, rivers, and intermittent rivers.
