= Pinheyschna rileyi =

Conservation status
- Least Concern (IUCN 3.1)

Scientific classification
- Kingdom: Animalia
- Phylum: Arthropoda
- Class: Insecta
- Order: Odonata
- Infraorder: Anisoptera
- Family: Aeshnidae
- Genus: Pinheyschna
- Species: P. rileyi

Binomial name
- Pinheyschna rileyi (Calvert, 1892)

Species of dragonfly

Pinheyschna rileyi, the Riley's hawker, is a species of dragonfly in the family Aeshnidae. It is found in Angola, Kenya, Malawi, Mozambique, Sudan, Tanzania, Uganda, Zambia, Zimbabwe, and possibly Burundi. Its natural habitats are subtropical or tropical dry forests, subtropical or tropical moist montane forests, subtropical or tropical high-altitude shrubland, and rivers.
