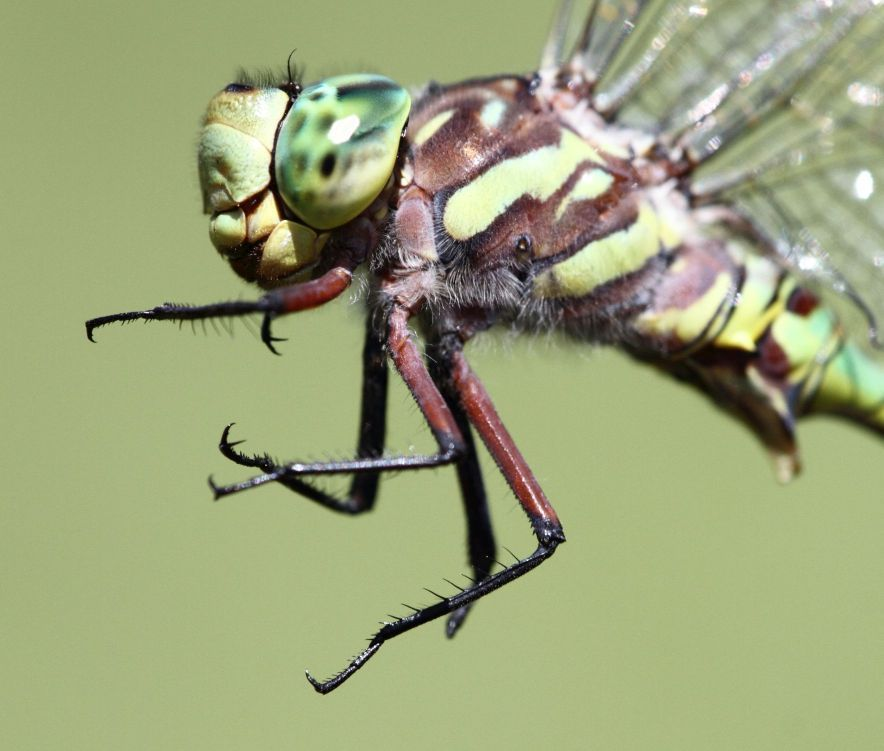
- Pinheyschna subpupillata

Scientific classification
- Kingdom: Animalia
- Phylum: Arthropoda
- Class: Insecta
- Order: Odonata
- Infraorder: Anisoptera
- Family: Aeshnidae
- Subfamily: Aeshninae
- Genus: Pinheyschna; Peters & Theischinger, 2011

Species
- See text

= Pinheyschna =

Genus of dragonflies

Pinheyschna is the scientific name of a genus of dragonflies from the family Aeshnidae. These relatively large dragonflies are also known as hawkers.

== Species ==
The genus Pinheyschna includes the following species:

- Pinheyschna meruensis Sjöstedt, 1909 - Meru hawker
- Pinheyschna moori Pinhey, 1981 - Zambesi hawker
- Pinheyschna rileyi Calvert, 1892 - bullseye hawker
- Pinheyschna subpupillata McLachlan, 1896 - stream hawker
- Pinheyschna yemenensis Waterston, 1985 - Yemen hawker
