= Zosteraeschna ellioti =

Highland hawker

Conservation status
- Least Concern (IUCN 3.1)

Scientific classification
- Kingdom: Animalia
- Phylum: Arthropoda
- Class: Insecta
- Order: Odonata
- Infraorder: Anisoptera
- Family: Aeshnidae
- Genus: Zosteraeschna
- Species: Z. ellioti

Binomial name
- Zosteraeschna ellioti Kirby, 1896

Synonyms
- Aeshna ellioti Kirby, 1896

Species of dragonfly

Zosteraeschna ellioti, the highland hawker or Elliot's hawker, is a species of dragonfly in the family Aeshnidae. It is found in Ethiopia, Kenya, Malawi, Mozambique, South Africa, Tanzania, Uganda, Zimbabwe, and possibly Burundi. Its natural habitats are subtropical or tropical moist montane forests, subtropical or tropical high-altitude shrubland, rivers, freshwater marshes, freshwater springs, and alpine wetlands.
