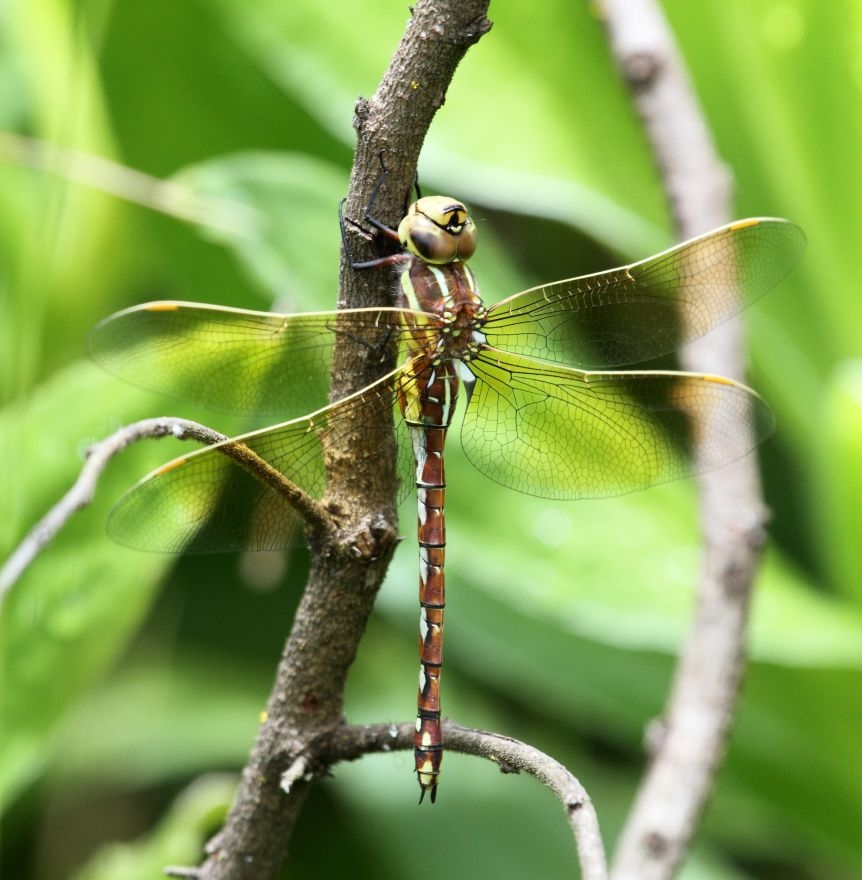
- Female

Conservation status
- Least Concern (IUCN 3.1)

Scientific classification
- Kingdom: Animalia
- Phylum: Arthropoda
- Class: Insecta
- Order: Odonata
- Infraorder: Anisoptera
- Family: Aeshnidae
- Genus: Zosteraeschna
- Species: Z. minuscula

Binomial name
- Zosteraeschna minuscula (MacLachlan, 1896)

Synonyms
- Aeshna dolobrata; Aeshna minuscula

= Zosteraeschna minuscula =

Species of dragonfly

Zosteraeschna minuscula, the friendly hawker is a species of dragonfly in family Aeshnidae. It is found in South Africa and Namibia. Its natural habitats include ponds and still pools in montane streams.

This is a fairly large species; 59–62 mm long with a wingspan of 76–83 mm. The thorax is brown with green stripes, and the abdomen is brown and blue. The eyes are green. It is similar to Pinheyschna subpupillata and Zosteraeschna usambarica, but has an anchor- or T-shaped mark on the frons. Males have a blue saddle on the abdomen near the thorax, and females and tenerals have an amber wash on the wings.

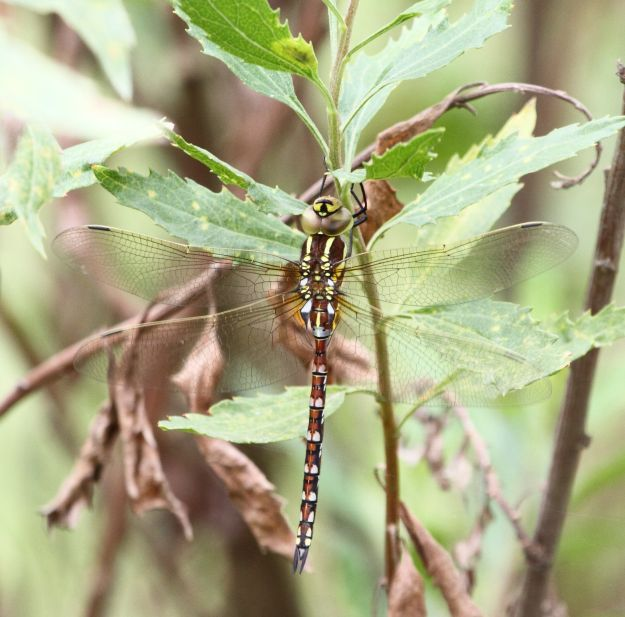
Male

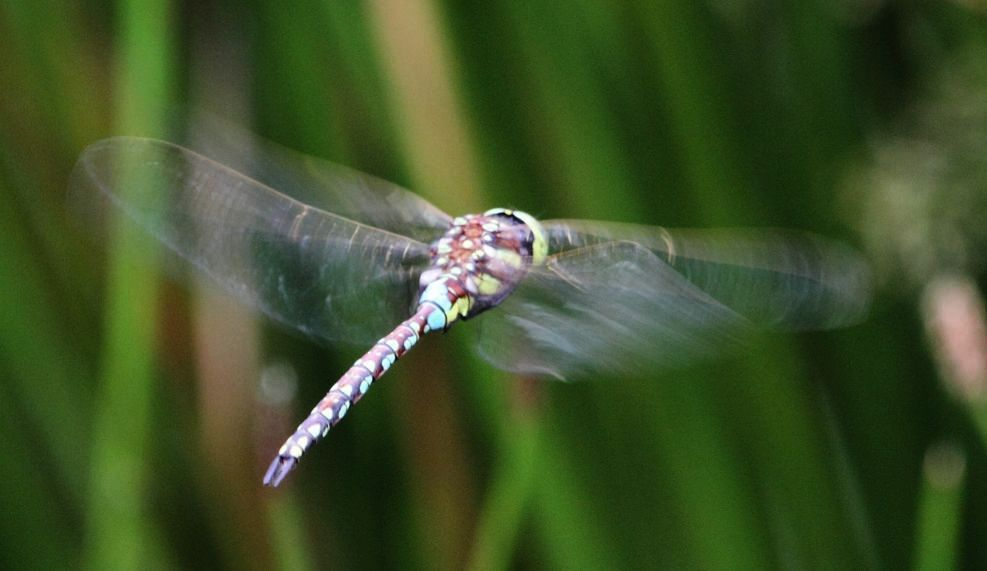
Male in flight

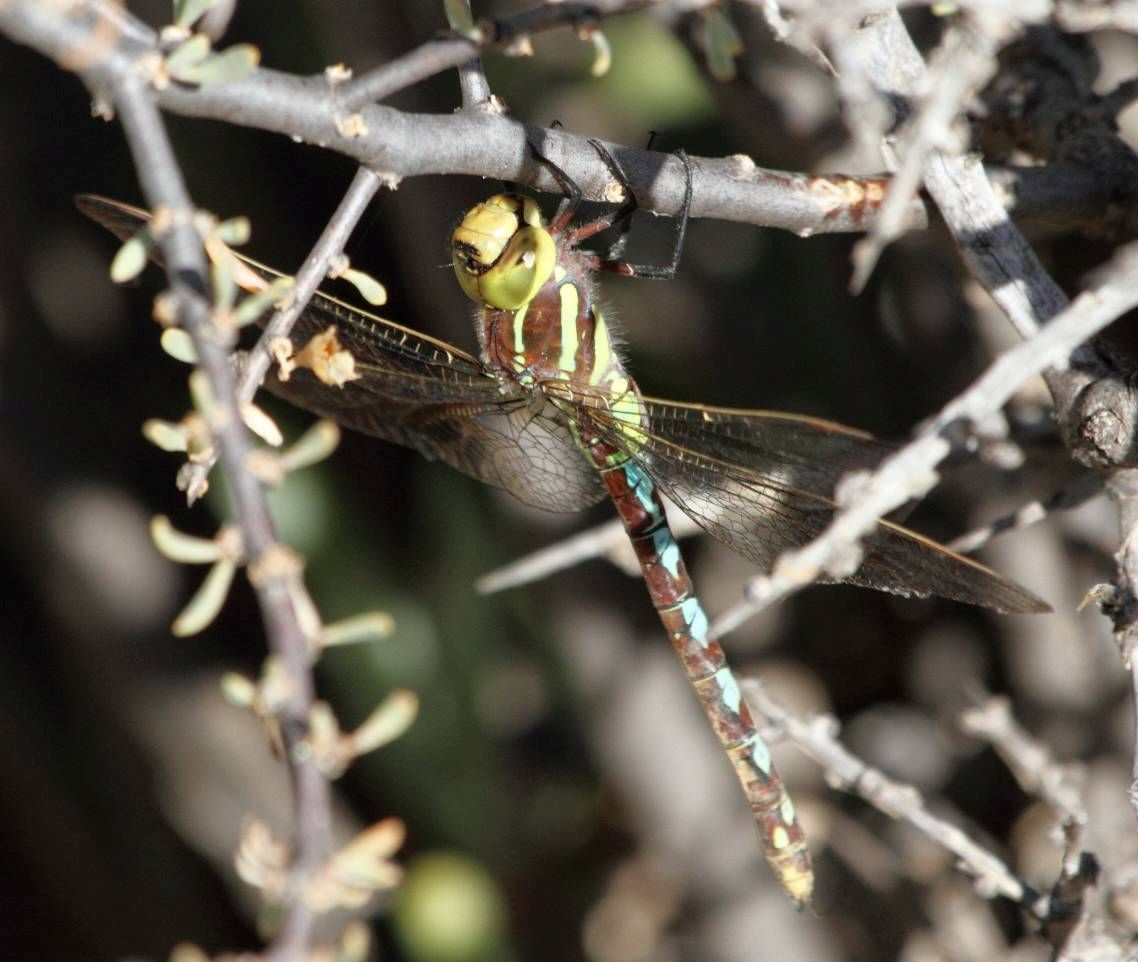
Female

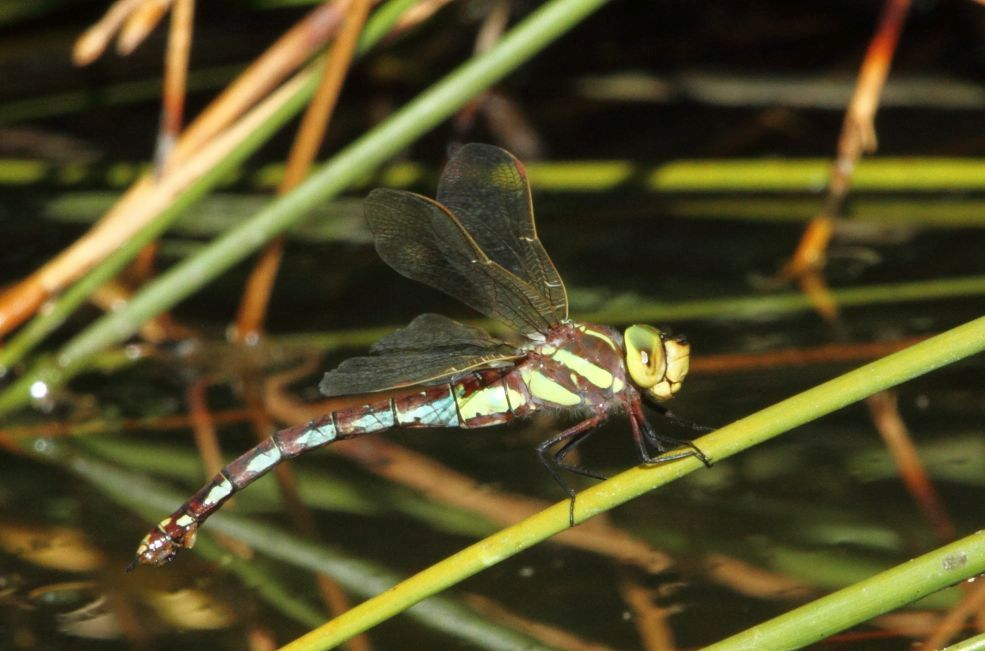
Female

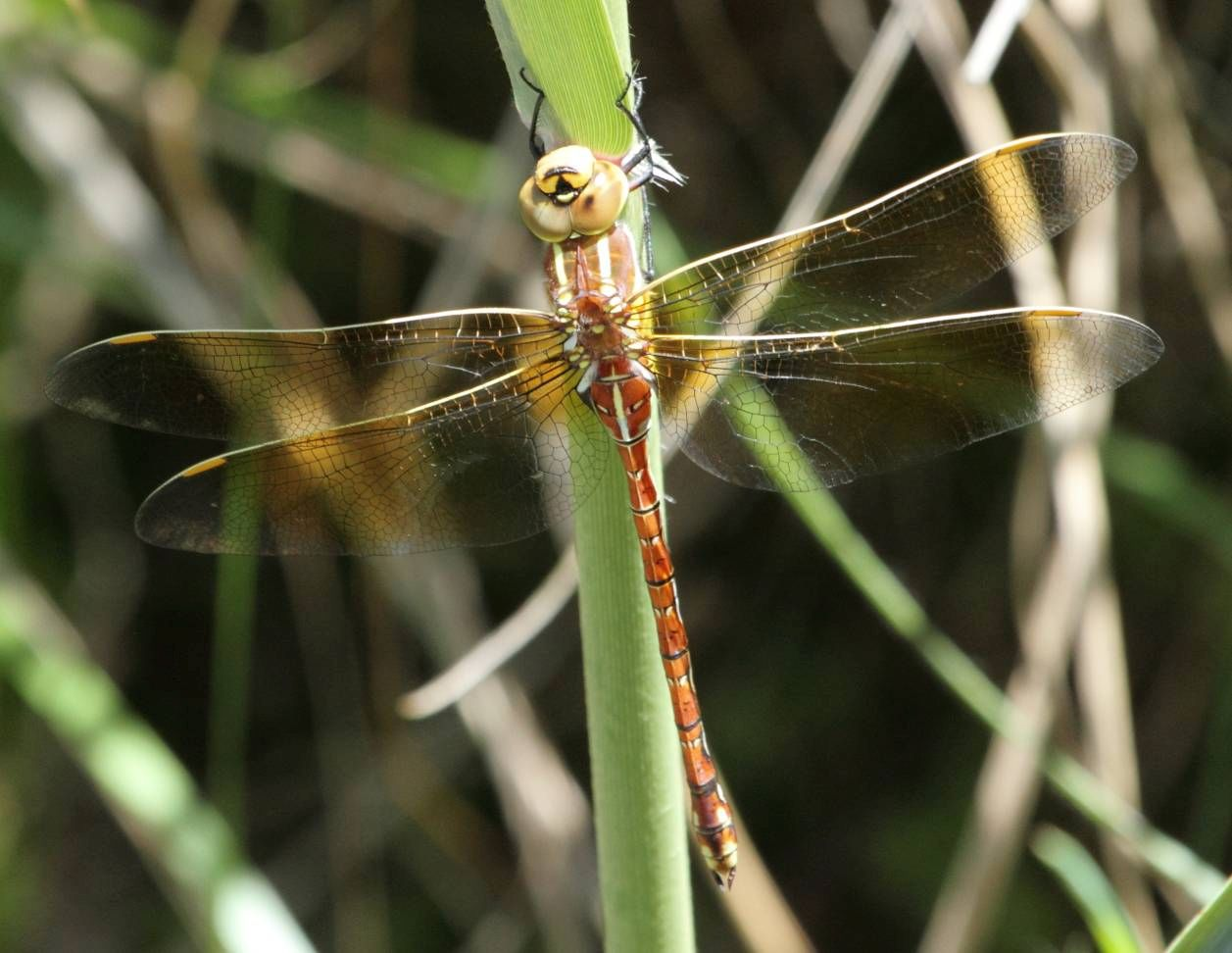
Teneral female

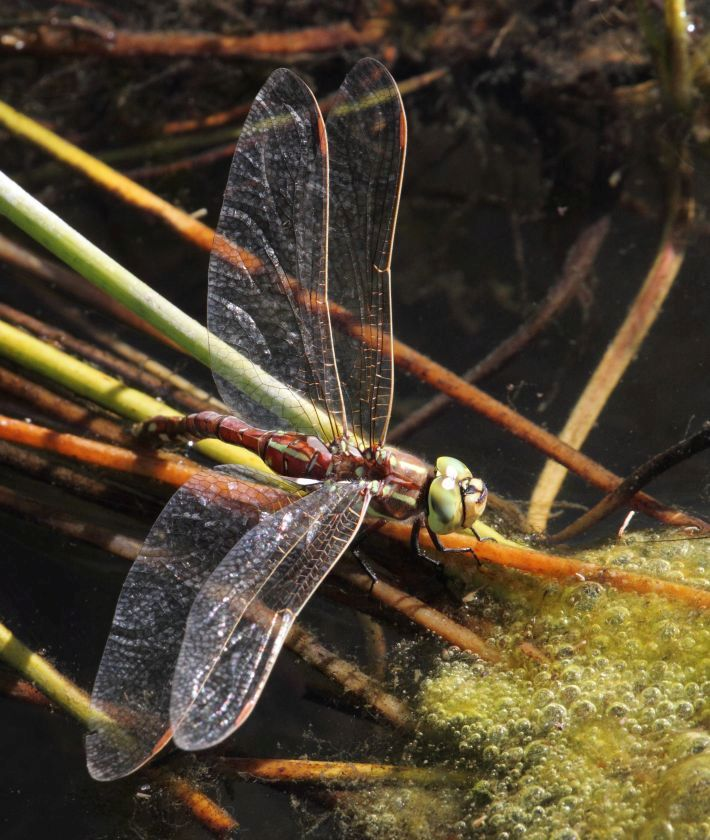
Female ovipositing

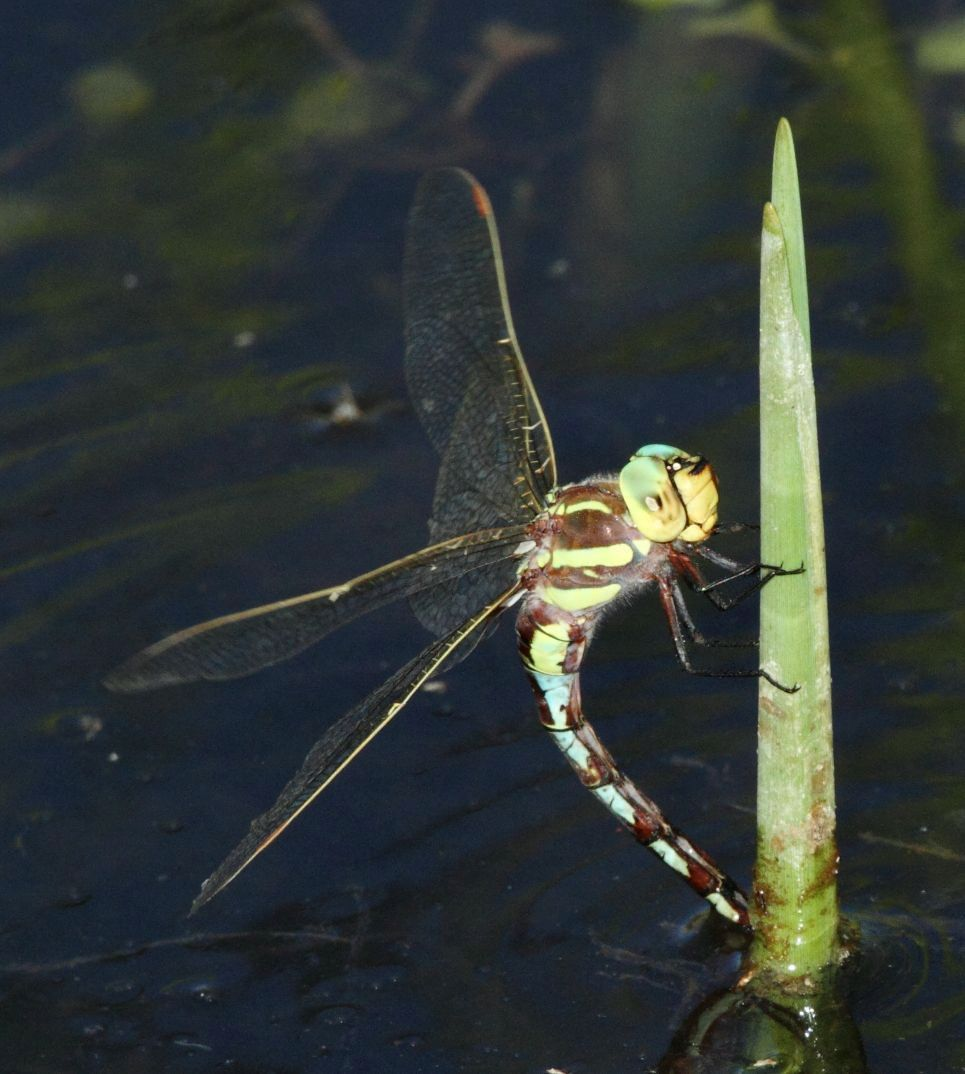
Female ovipositing
