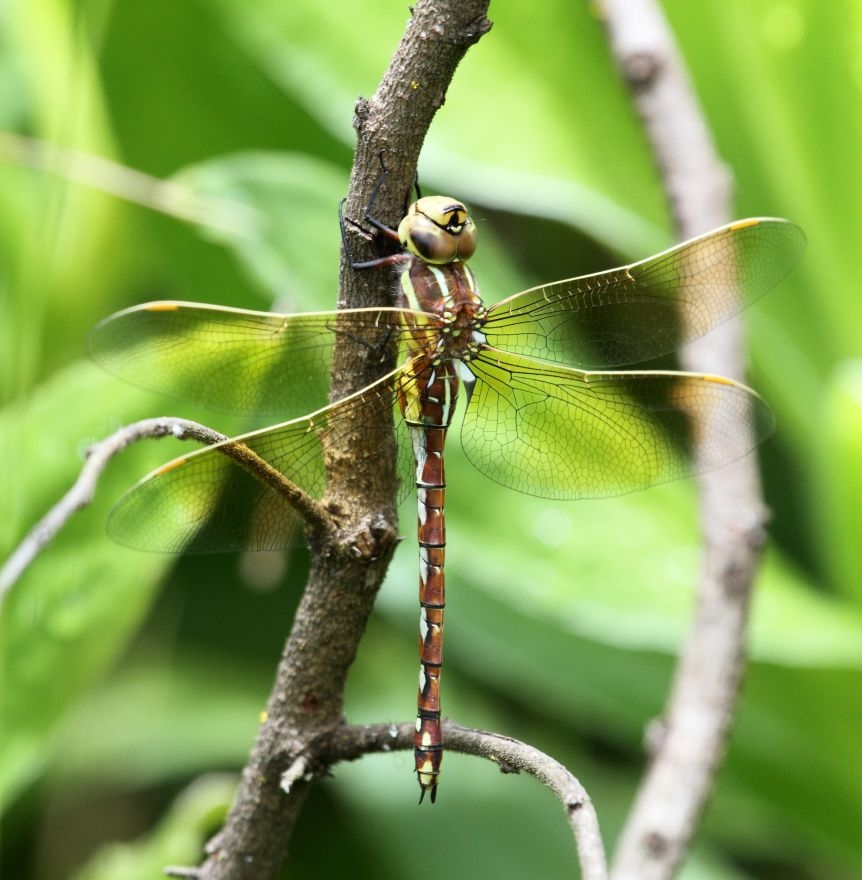
- Zosteraeschna minuscula

Scientific classification
- Kingdom: Animalia
- Phylum: Arthropoda
- Clade: Pancrustacea
- Class: Insecta
- Order: Odonata
- Infraorder: Anisoptera
- Family: Aeshnidae
- Subfamily: Aeshninae
- Genus: Zosteraeschna; Peters & Theischinger, 2011

Species
- See text.

= Zosteraeschna =

Genus of dragonflies

Zosteraeschna is the scientific name of a genus of dragonflies from the family Aeshnidae. These relatively large dragonflies are also known as hawkers. They are dark brown with yellow-green markings; On the abdomens of the males, much of the top of S2 and base of S3 are blue.

== Species ==
The genus Zosteraeschna includes the following species:

- Zosteraeschna ellioti (Kirby, 1896)
- Zosteraeschna minuscula (MacLachlan, 1896)
- Zosteraeschna usambarica (Förster, 1906)

Some authorities treat Zosteraeschna usambarica as a subspecies of Zosteraeschna ellioti.
