= List of Odonata of Estonia =

This article contains a list of the dragonfly species recorded in Estonia. The total number of species recorded is 51 (made up of 17 damselflies (suborder Zygoptera) and 34 true dragonflies) (suborder Anisoptera)

== Suborder Zygoptera (damselflies) ==
=== Family Calopterygidae (demoiselles) ===
- Banded demoiselle, Calopteryx splendens
- Beautiful demoiselle, Calopteryx virgo

=== Family Lestidae (emerald damselflies) ===
- Lestes virens
- Scarce Emerald Damselfly, Lestes dryas (=Lestes nympha)
- Emerald Damselfly, Lestes sponsa

=== Family Coenagrionidae (blue, blue-tailed, and red damselflies) ===
- White-legged Damselfly, Platycnemis pennipes
- Pygmy Damselfly, Nehalennia speciosa
- Blue-tailed Damselfly, Ischnura elegans
- Common Blue Damselfly, Enallagma cyathigerum
- Arctic Bluet, Coenagrion johanssoni
- Northern Damselfly, Coenagrion hastulatum
- Norfolk Damselfly, Coenagrion armatum
- Irish Damselfly, Coenagrion lunulatum
- Variable Damselfly, Coenagrion pulchellum
- Azure Damselfly, Coenagrion puella
- Red-eyed Damselfly, Erythromma najas
- Large Red Damselfly, Pyrrhosoma nymphula

== Suborder Anisoptera (true dragonflies) ==
=== Family Gomphidae (club-tailed dragonflies) ===
- Yellow-legged Dragonfly, Gomphus flavipes
- Club-tailed Dragonfly, Gomphus vulgatissimis
- Green club-tailed dragonfly, Ophiogomphus cecilia
- Green-eyed hook-tailed dragonfly, Onychogomphus forcipatus

=== Family Aeshnidae (hawkers and emperors) ===
- Hairy Dragonfly, Brachytron pratense
- Azure Hawker, Aeshna caerulea (=Aeshna squamata)
- Common Hawker, Aeshna juncea
- Migrant hawker, Aeshna coluberculus
- Southern Hawker, Aescna cyanea
- Green hawker, Aeshna viridis
- Brown hawker, Aeshna grandis
- Subarctic darner, Aeshna subarctica
- Aeshna osiliensis

=== Family Cordulegastridae (golden-ringed Dragonflies) ===
- Golden-ringed dragonfly, Cordulegaster annulatus

== Family Corduliidae (emerald dragonflies) ==
- Two-spotted Dragonfly, Epitheca bimaculata
- Downy Emerald, Cordulia aenea
- Brilliant Emerald, Somatochlora metallica
- Yellow-spotted emerald, Somatochlora flavomaculata
- Northern Emerald, Somatochlora arctica

== Family Libellulidae (chasers, skimmers, and darters) ==
- Keeled Skimmer, Orthetrum coerulescens
- Black-tailed Skimmer, Orthetrum cancellatum
- Broad-bodied Chaser, Libellula depressa
- Four-spotted Chaser, Libellula quadrimaculata
- Scarce Chaser, Libellula fulva
- Yellow-winged Darter, Sympetrum flaveolum
- Black Darter, Sympetrum danae
- Vagrant Darter, Sympetrum vulgatum
- Common Darter, Sympetrum striolatum
- Ruddy Darter, Sympetrum sanguineum
- Leucorrhinia caudalis
- Eastern White-faced Darter, Leucorrhinia albifrons
- Large White-faced Darter, Leucorrhinia pectoralis
- White-faced Darter, Leucorrhinia dubia
- Northern White-faced Darter, Leucorrhinia rubicunda
