= List of Odonata species of Finland =

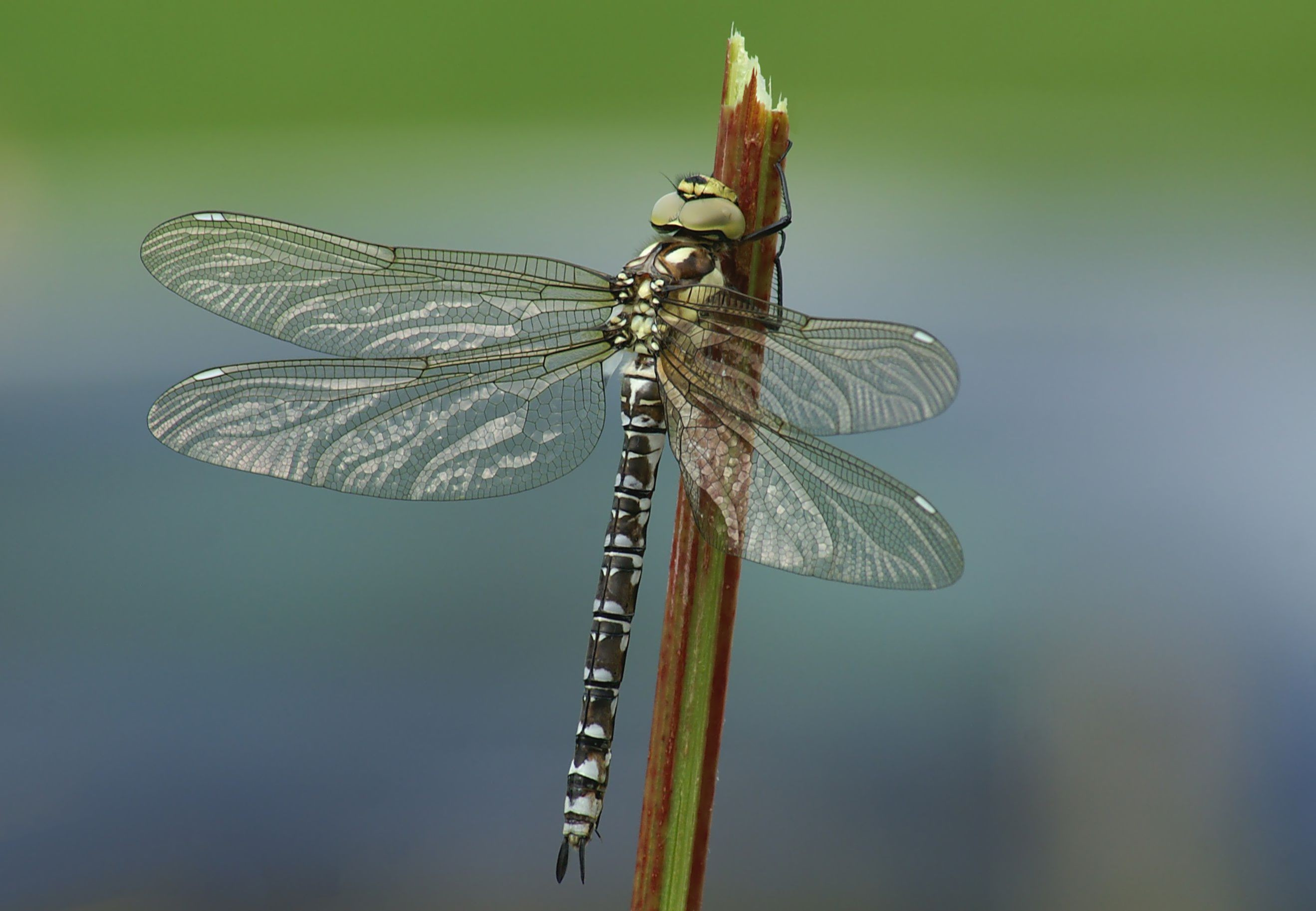
Aeshna cyanea

List of Odonata species recorded in Finland include all dragonflies (Anisoptera) and damselflies (Zygoptera) which have been recorded in Finland. Currently there are 57 species and only one species (Nehalennia speciosa) is classified as endangered (EN) Six species are protected by law.

== Zygoptera (damselflies) ==
=== Calopterygidae ===
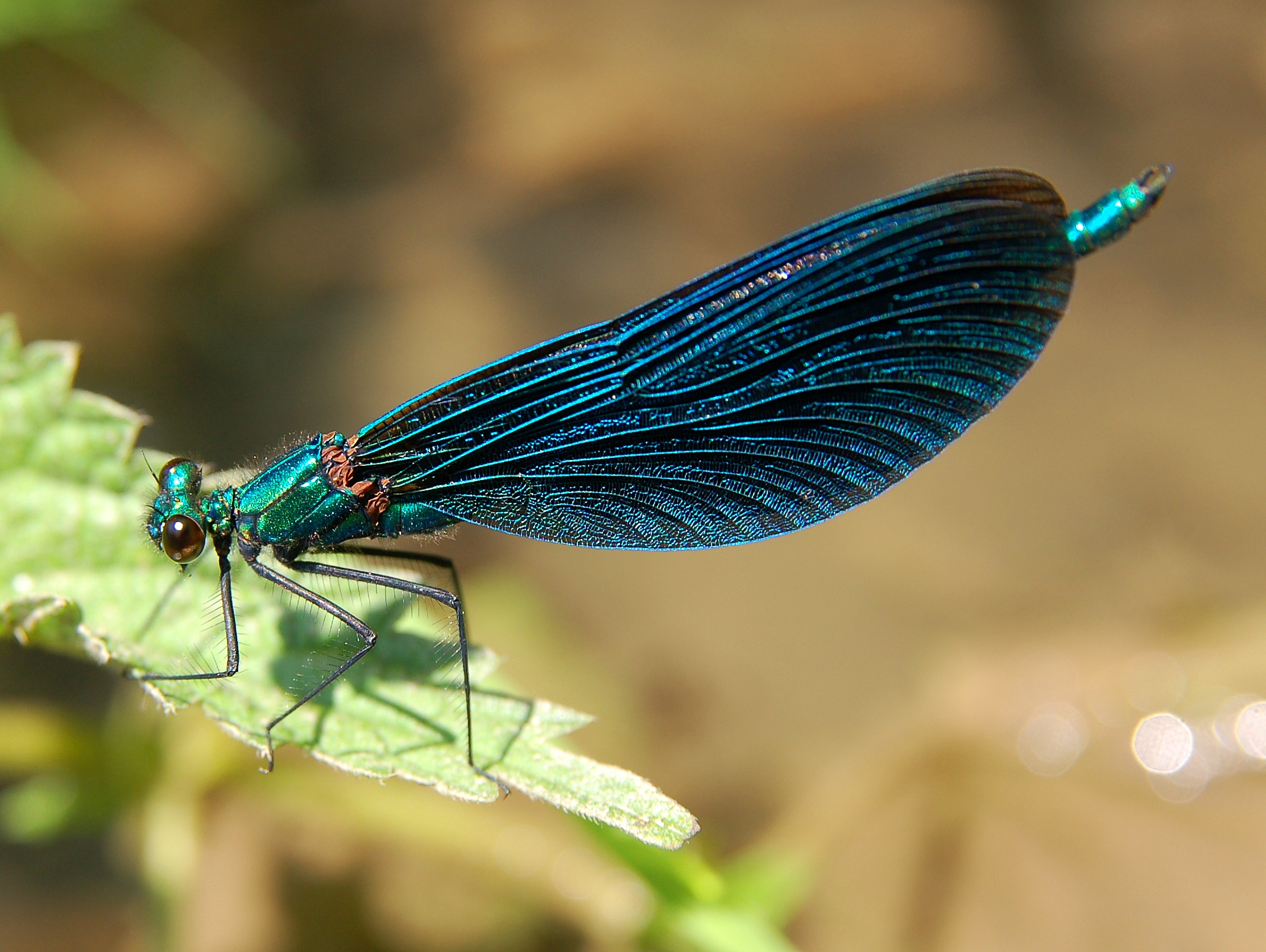
Calopteryx virgo

- Calopteryx splendens, banded demoiselle
- Calopteryx virgo, beautiful demoiselle

=== Lestidae ===
- Lestes dryas, emerald spreadwing
- Lestes sponsa, common spreadwing
- Sympecma paedisca, siberian winter damselfly (protected by law)

=== Coenagrionidae ===
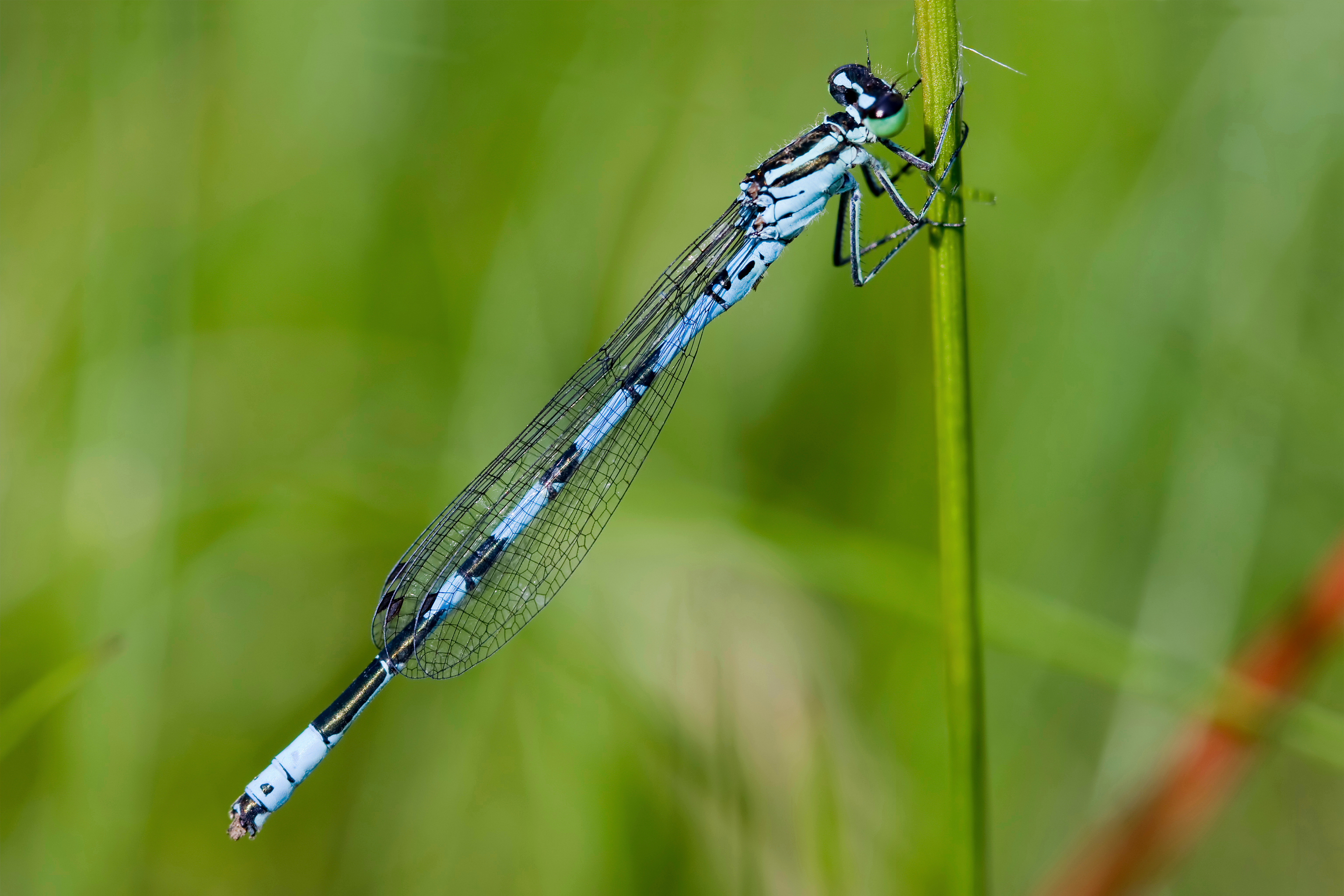
Coenagrion hastulatum

- Coenagrion armatum Dark Bluet
- Coenagrion hastulatum Spearhead Bluet
- Coenagrion johanssoni Arctic Bluet
- Coenagrion lunulatum Crescent Bluet
- Coenagrion puella Azure Damselfly
- Coenagrion pulchellum Variable Damselfly
- Enallagma cyathigerum Common Blue Damselfly
- Erythromma najas Red-eyed Damselfly EN
- Ischnura elegans Blue-tailed Damselfly
- Ischnura pumilio Small Bluetail
- Nehalennia speciosa Pygmy Damselfly
- Pyrrhosoma nymphula Large Red Damselfly

=== Platycnemididae ===
- Platycnemis pennipes White-legged Damselfly

== Dragonflies Anisoptera ==
=== Aeshnidae ===
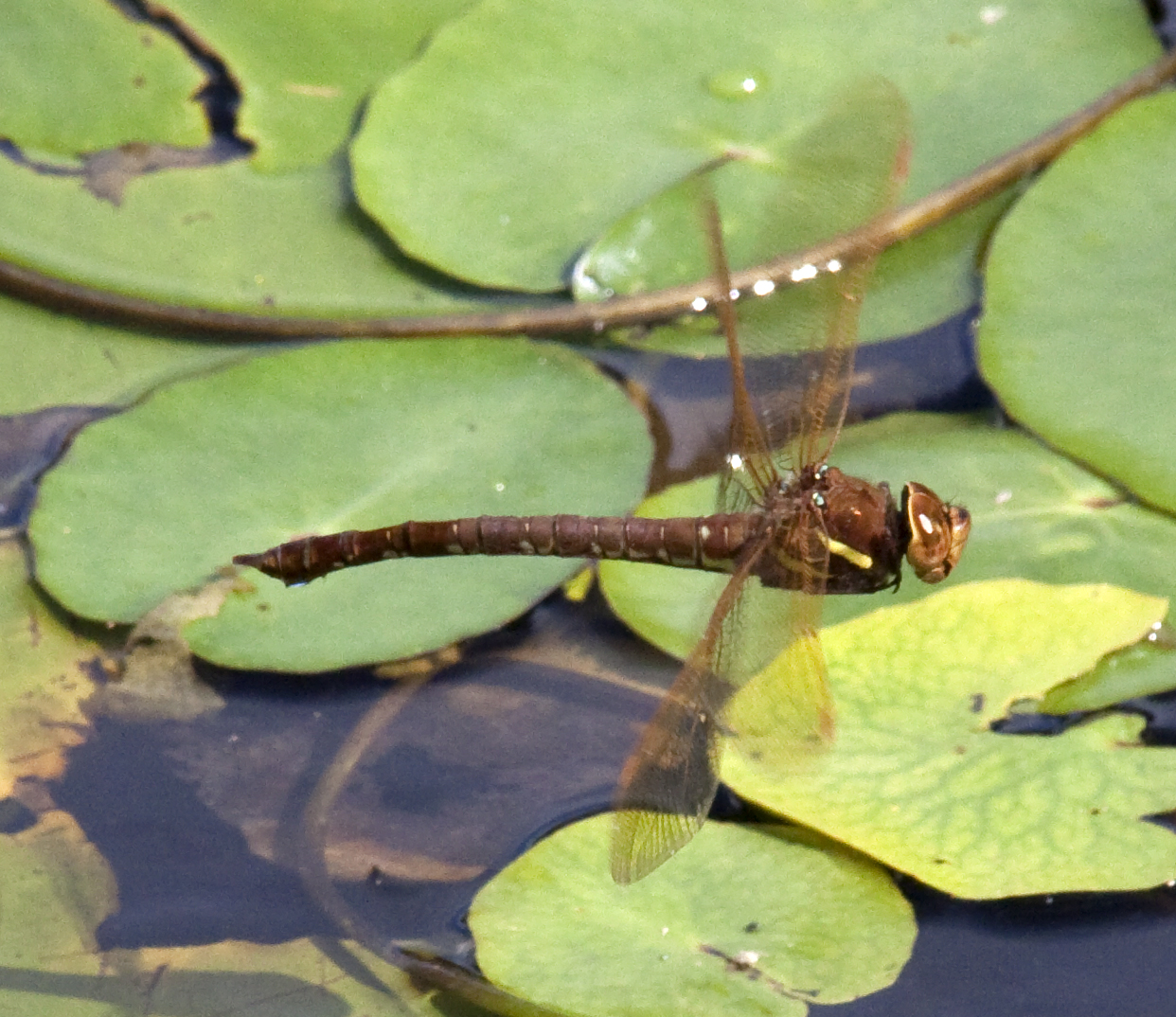
Aeshna grandis

- Aeshna affinis Southern Migrant Hawker
- Aeshna caerulea Azure Hawker
- Aeshna crenata Siberian Hawker
- Aeshna cyanea Southern Hawker
- Aeshna grandis Brown Hawker
- Aeshna juncea Common Hawker
- Aeshna mixta Migrant Hawker
- Aeshna serrata Baltic Hawker
- Aeshna subarctica Bog Hawker
- Aeshna viridis Green Hawker protected by law
- Anax imperator Emperor Dragonfly
- Brachytron pratense Hairy Dragonfly

=== Gomphidae ===
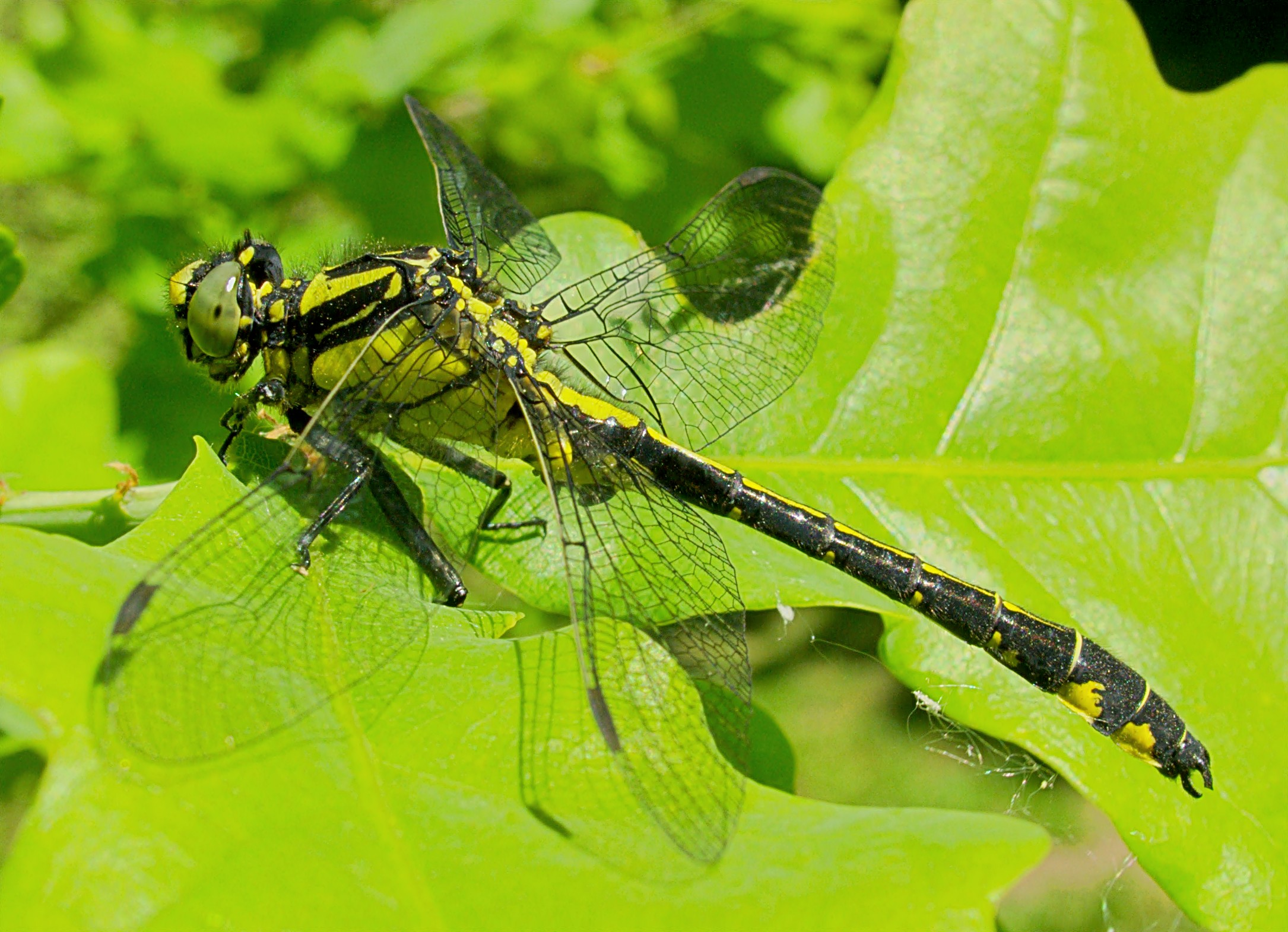
Gomphus vulgatissimus

- Gomphus vulgatissimus Common Club-tail
- Onychogomphus forcipatus Small Pincertail
- Ophiogomphus cecilia Green Snaketail protected by law

=== Cordulegastridae ===
- Cordulegaster boltonii Golden-ringed Dragonfly

=== Corduliidae ===
- Cordulia aenea Downy Emerald
- Epitheca bimaculata Eurasian Baskettail
- Somatochlora alpestris Alpine Emerald
- Somatochlora arctica Northern Emerald
- Somatochlora flavomaculata Yellow-Spotted Emerald
- Somatochlora metallica Brilliant Emerald
- Somatochlora sahlbergi Treeline Emerald

=== Libellulidae ===
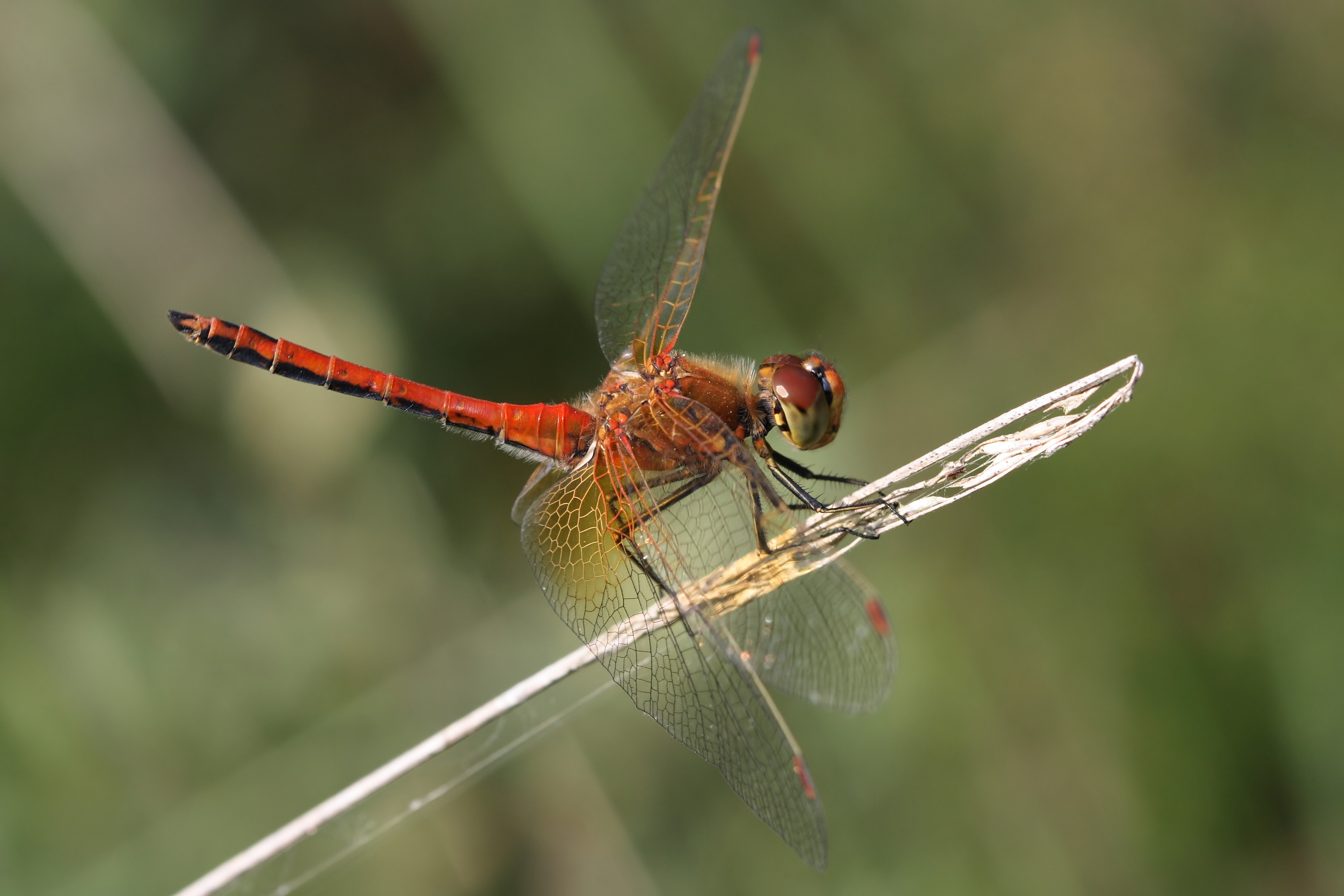
Sympetrum flaveolum

- Libellula depressa Broad-bodied Chaser
- Libellula fulva Scarce Chaser
- Libellula quadrimaculata Four-spotted Chaser
- Leucorrhinia albifrons Dark Whiteface protected by law
- Leucorrhinia caudalis Lilypad Whiteface protected by law
- Leucorrhinia dubia Small Whiteface
- Leucorrhinia pectoralis Yellow-Spotted Whiteface protected by law
- Leucorrhinia rubicunda Ruby Whiteface
- Orthetrum cancellatum Black-Tailed Skimmer
- Orthetrum coerulescens Keeled Skimmer
- Sympetrum danae Black Darter
- Sympetrum flaveolum Yellow-winged Darter
- Sympetrum pedemontanum Banded Darter
- Sympetrum sanguineum Ruddy Darter
- Sympetrum striolatum Common Darter
- Sympetrum vulgatum Vagrant Darter

== See also ==
- Finnish Dragonfly Society (in English and Finnish)
- Sami Karjalainen: Suomen Sudenkorennot (The Dragonflies of Finland). Tammi 2010. ISBN 978-951-31-5425-7
