= List of Odonata species of Slovenia =

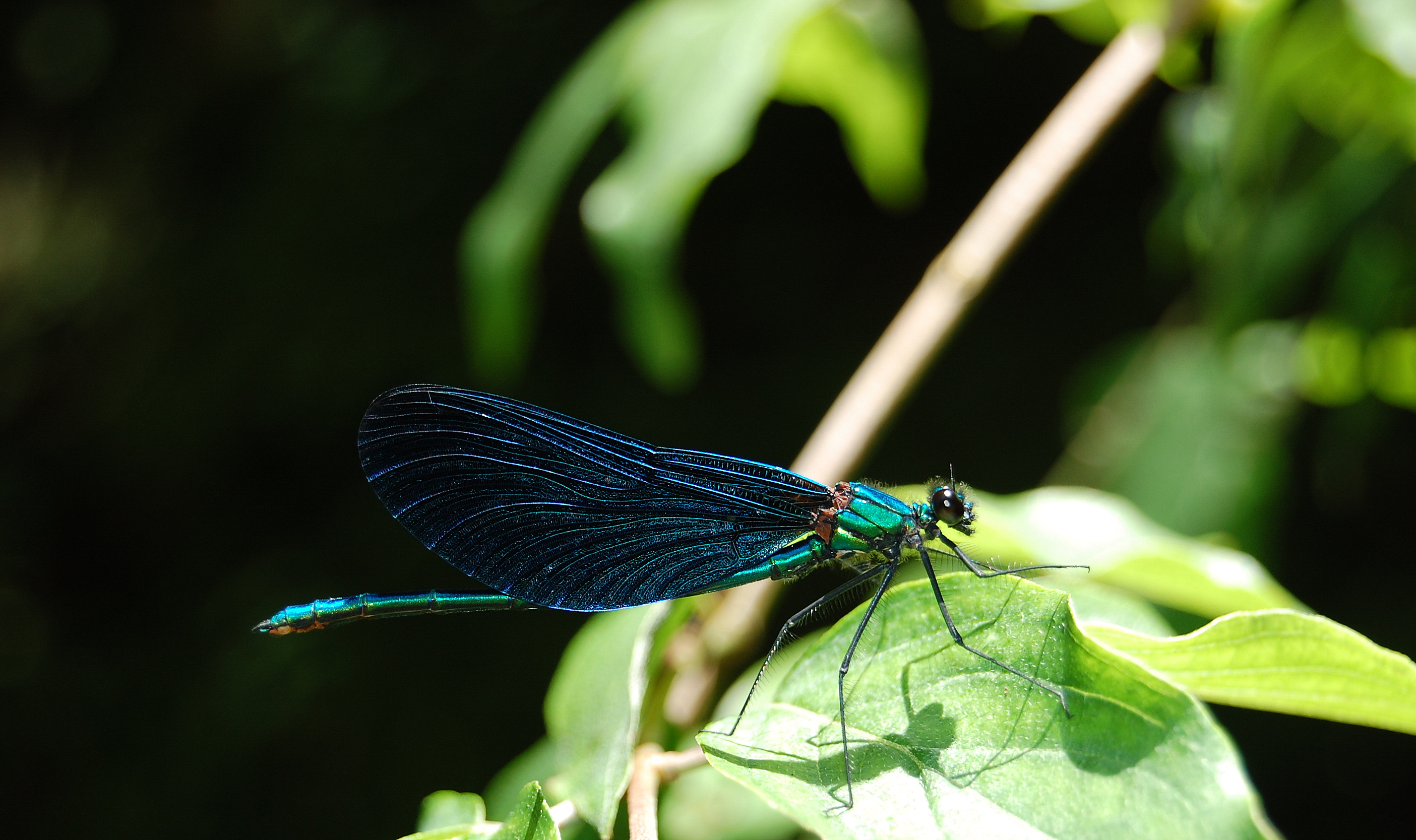
The beautiful demoiselle (Calopteryx virgo) is one of the most common species of Odonata in Slovenia, a regular sight along overgrown brooks in hilly regions during warmer months.

Location of Slovenia (darker green) within Europe (Western Palaearctic realm)

The list of Odonata species of Slovenia includes 72 species of dragonflies and damselflies (Slovene: kačji pastirji) for which reliable records exist from the present-day territory of Slovenia, including one that has not been seen since the 1960s and is presumed to have been extirpated (locally extinct), but could have simply been overlooked. The list is based on two reference works: Atlas of the Dragonflies (Odonata) of Slovenia, a joint publication of the Slovene Odonatological Society and the Slovene Centre for Cartography of Fauna and Flora from 1997, and the newer Atlas of the European dragonflies and damselflies (2015), supported by other, more recent publications in which new species described after 1997 were documented.

Odonata species from the territory of present-day Slovenia were systematically studied by the naturalists Johann Weikhard von Valvasor and Giovanni Antonio Scopoli as early as the 17th and 18th centuries; however, the first systematic compendium was only published in the 1960s by the Slovene zoologist Boštjan Kiauta. The distribution of Odonata in Slovenia is now fairly well known by international standards, with Slovenia having been one of the first European countries for which a full account of faunistic data (an "atlas") was published. The number of species (72) represents almost exactly half of the European species (143) and is comparable with the number of species of Germany (81) and Spain (80), both much larger countries. Slovenian odonate fauna is therefore considered highly diverse, which is attributed to the country's position on the junction of several ecoregions where many species reach the border of their distribution.

== The list ==
Taxonomic order and nomenclature follow the Atlas of the European dragonflies and damselflies (2015), while Atlas of the Dragonflies (Odonata) of Slovenia is the primary source of the data, with notes explaining discrepancies.

Columns with scientific and vernacular names in English and Slovene are followed by conservation status as determined by the country's official Red list of Odonata (Rdeči seznam kačjih pastirjev). Categories of conservation status according to this list are as follows:

- extinct species (EX): once reliably recorded native populations that have been exterminated in the past throughout the whole territory of the Republic of Slovenia.
- presumed extinct species (EX?): once reliably recorded native populations which haven't been seen for a longer period despite targeted searching, providing grounds for the presumption of local extinction.
- endangered species (E): the existence of this species on the territory of Slovenia is not likely in the future if the reasons for endangerment are not removed. Population size is critically low or is rapidly diminishing in a large part of the areal.
- vulnerable species (V): risk of becoming endangered (E) if the negative influences persist. Population size is being reduced in a large part of the areal, whereas the species is sensitive to changes in the environment or inhabits sensitive habitats.
- rare species (R): potentially vulnerable due to its rarity in Slovenia, may rapidly become endangered (E) in case of negative influences.
- non-defined (I): presumed endangered, but there is insufficient data to assign to any of the above categories.

Most (24) of the species included in the Red List are also protected according to the newer Ordinance on protected native species of animals (Uredba o zavarovanih prosto živečih živalskih vrstah) from 2004, which annulled the previous ordinance on which the Red list is based. The protected species are labelled with an additional asterisk (*), while the old Red list statuses are retained for reference.

Most species native to Slovenia are not globally threatened and are regarded least-concern by the International Union for Conservation of Nature (IUCN). There are two exceptions – both Cordulegaster species – that are near-threatened. Additionally, the southern damselfly (Coenagrion mercuriale) is near-threatened as well, but that species is almost certainly extirpated.

=== Damselflies (Zygoptera) ===
Damselflies (Zygoptera)
Family	Scientific name	Vernacular name in English and Slovene	Status (SLO)	Status (IUCN)	Notes	Photograph
Spreadwings (Lestidae)	Chalcolestes parvidens	eastern willow spreadwing (presenetljiva pazverca)	I	LC	C. parvidens and C. viridis are difficult to distinguish, and were split only in 1997. In the Slovene Atlas they are treated as a single species (both are present in Slovenia).	Chalcolestes parvidens
Spreadwings (Lestidae)	Chalcolestes viridis	willow emerald damselfly (zelena pazverca)		LC	See the note for C. parvidens.	Chalcolestes viridis
Spreadwings (Lestidae)	Lestes barbarus	southern emerald damselfly (grmiščna zverca)	V	LC		Lestes barbarus
Spreadwings (Lestidae)	Lestes dryas	emerald spreadwing (obrežna zverca)	E*	LC		Lestes dryas
Spreadwings (Lestidae)	Lestes macrostigma	dark spreadwing (južna zverca)	R*	LC		Lestes macrostigma
Spreadwings (Lestidae)	Lestes sponsa	emerald damselfly (obvodna zverca)		LC		Lestes sponsa
Spreadwings (Lestidae)	Lestes virens	small spreadwing (loška zverca)	E*	LC		Lestes virens
Spreadwings (Lestidae)	Sympecma fusca	common winter damselfly (prisojni zimnik)		LC		Sympecma fusca
Demoiselles (Calopterygidae)	Calopteryx splendens	banded demoiselle (pasasti bleščavec)		LC		Calopteryx splendens
Demoiselles (Calopterygidae)	Calopteryx virgo	beautiful demoiselle (modri bleščavec)		LC		Calopteryx virgo
White-legged damselflies (Platycnemididae)	Platycnemis pennipes	white-legged damselfly (sinji presličar)		LC		Platycnemis pennipes
Narrow-winged damselflies (Coenagrionidae)	Ceriagrion tenellum	small red damselfly (rdeči voščenec)	E*	LC		Ceriagrion tenellum
Narrow-winged damselflies (Coenagrionidae)	Coenagrion hastulatum	northern damselfly (barjanski škratec)	E*	LC	Thought extirpated in the late 20th century, the species was rediscovered in 1999.	Coenagrion hastulatum
Narrow-winged damselflies (Coenagrionidae)	Coenagrion mercuriale	southern damselfly (brzični škratec)	EX?*	NT	Last recorded by Boštjan Kiauta in the 1960s, the species is cited in the Slovene Atlas as possibly extirpated, while the newer European Atlas no longer lists it. Not included in the total number of species.	Coenagrion mercuriale
Narrow-winged damselflies (Coenagrionidae)	Coenagrion ornatum	ornate bluet (koščični škratec)	V	LC		Coenagrion ornatum
Narrow-winged damselflies (Coenagrionidae)	Coenagrion puella	azure damselfly (travniški škratec)		LC		Coenagrion puella
Narrow-winged damselflies (Coenagrionidae)	Coenagrion pulchellum	variable damselfly (suhljati škratec)	V	LC		Coenagrion pulchellum
Narrow-winged damselflies (Coenagrionidae)	Coenagrion scitulum	dainty damselfly (povodni škratec)	V	LC		Coenagrion scitulum
Narrow-winged damselflies (Coenagrionidae)	Enallagma cyathigerum	common blue damselfly (bleščeči zmotec)		LC		Enallagma cyathigerum
Narrow-winged damselflies (Coenagrionidae)	Erythromma lindenii	goblet-marked damselfly (prodni paškratec)	V	LC		Erythromma lindenii
Narrow-winged damselflies (Coenagrionidae)	Erythromma najas	red-eyed damselfly (veliki rdečeokec)		NE		Erythromma najas
Narrow-winged damselflies (Coenagrionidae)	Erythromma viridulum	small red-eyed damselfly (mali rdečeokec)		LC		Erythromma viridulum
Narrow-winged damselflies (Coenagrionidae)	Ischnura elegans	blue-tailed damselfly (modri kresničar)		LC		Ischnura elegans
Narrow-winged damselflies (Coenagrionidae)	Ischnura pumilio	scarce blue-tailed damselfly (bledi kresničar)		LC		Ischnura pumilio
Narrow-winged damselflies (Coenagrionidae)	Pyrrhosoma nymphula	large red damselfly (rani plamenec)		LC		Pyrrhosoma nymphula

=== Dragonflies (Anisoptera) ===
Dragonflies (Anisoptera)
Family	Scientific name	Vernacular name in English and Slovene	Status (SLO)	Status (IUCN)	Notes	Photograph
Hawkers (Aeshnidae)	Aeshna affinis	southern migrant hawker (višnjeva deva)	V	LC		Aeshna affinis
Hawkers (Aeshnidae)	Aeshna caerulea	azure hawker (šotna deva)	R*	LC	Only one record for Slovenia	Aeshna caerulea
Hawkers (Aeshnidae)	Aeshna cyanea	southern hawker (zelenomodra deva)		LC		Aeshna cyanea
Hawkers (Aeshnidae)	Aeshna grandis	brown hawker (rjava deva)	V	LC		Aeshna grandis
Hawkers (Aeshnidae)	Aeshna isoceles	green-eyed hawker (deviški pastir)	V	LC		Aeshna isoceles
Hawkers (Aeshnidae)	Aeshna juncea	common hawker (barjanska deva)	V	LC		Aeshna juncea
Hawkers (Aeshnidae)	Aeshna mixta	migrant hawker (bleda deva)		LC		Aeshna mixta
Hawkers (Aeshnidae)	Aeshna subarctica	subarctic darner (mahovna deva)	R*	LC		Aeshna subarctica
Hawkers (Aeshnidae)	Aeshna viridis	green hawker (zelena deva)	E*	LC		Aeshna viridis
Hawkers (Aeshnidae)	Anax ephippiger	vagrant emperor (afriški minljivec)		LC		Anax ephippiger
Hawkers (Aeshnidae)	Anax imperator	emperor dragonfly (veliki spremljevalec)		LC		Anax imperator
Hawkers (Aeshnidae)	Anax parthenope	lesser emperor (modroriti spremljevalec)		LC		Anax parthenope
Hawkers (Aeshnidae)	Brachytron pratense	hairy dragonfly (zgodnji trstničar)	V	LC		Brachytron pratense
Clubtails (Gomphidae)	Gomphus flavipes	yellow-legged dragonfly (rumeni porečnik)	EX?*	LC	Thought extirpated in the late 20th century, rediscovered in 2011; not yet included in the official Red list.	Gomphus flavipes
Clubtails (Gomphidae)	Gomphus vulgatissimus	common clubtail (popotni porečnik)	V	LC		Gomphus vulgatissimus
Clubtails (Gomphidae)	Lindenia tetraphylla	bladetail (velika peščenka)	EX*	LC	Last recorded by Boštjan Kiauta in 1960s in Fiesa, it is considered extirpated.	Lindenia tetraphylla
Clubtails (Gomphidae)	Onychogomphus forcipatus	small pincertail (bledi peščenec)		LC		Onychogomphus forcipatus
Clubtails (Gomphidae)	Ophiogomphus cecilia	green snaketail (kačji potočnik)	V*	LC		Ophiogomphus cecilia
Spiketails (Cordulegastridae)	Cordulegaster bidentata	sombre goldenring (povirni studenčar)	V	NT		Cordulegaster bidentata
Spiketails (Cordulegastridae)	Cordulegaster heros	balkan goldenring (veliki studenčar)	V*	NT	One of the largest European dragonflies; it was included in the annex of the Habitats Directive when Slovenia joined the European Union.	Cordulegaster heros
Emeralds (Corduliidae)	Cordulia aenea	downy emerald (močvirski lebduh)		LC		Cordulia aenea
Emeralds (Corduliidae)	Epitheca bimaculata	Eurasian baskettail (nosna jezerka)	V	NE		Epitheca bimaculata
Emeralds (Corduliidae)	Somatochlora alpestris	alpine emerald (alpski lesketnik)	R*	NE		Somatochlora alpestris
Emeralds (Corduliidae)	Somatochlora arctica	northern emerald (barjanski lesketnik)	R*	NE		Somatochlora arctica
Emeralds (Corduliidae)	Somatochlora flavomaculata	yellow-spotted emerald (pegasti lesketnik)	V	LC		Somatochlora flavomaculata
Emeralds (Corduliidae)	Somatochlora meridionalis	balkan emerald (sredozemski lesketnik)		LC		Somatochlora meridionalis
Emeralds (Corduliidae)	Somatochlora metallica	brilliant emerald (kovinski lesketnik)	E*	LC		Somatochlora metallica
Skimmers (Libellulidae)	Crocothemis erythraea	scarlet dragonfly (opoldanski škrlatec)		LC		Crocothemis erythraea
Skimmers (Libellulidae)	Leucorrhinia caudalis	lilypad whiteface (mrtvični spreletavec)	E*	LC		Leucorrhinia caudalis
Skimmers (Libellulidae)	Leucorrhinia dubia	white-faced darter (barjanski spreletavec)	E*	LC		Leucorrhinia dubia
Skimmers (Libellulidae)	Leucorrhinia pectoralis	large white-faced darter (dristavični spreletavec)	E*	LC		Leucorrhinia pectoralis
Skimmers (Libellulidae)	Libellula depressa	broad-bodied chaser (modri ploščec)		LC		Libellula depressa
Skimmers (Libellulidae)	Libellula fulva	scarce chaser (črni ploščec)	V	LC		Libellula fulva
Skimmers (Libellulidae)	Libellula quadrimaculata	four-spotted chaser (lisasti ploščec)		LC		Libellula quadrimaculata
Skimmers (Libellulidae)	Orthetrum albistylum	white-tailed skimmer (temni modrač)		LC		Orthetrum albistylum
Skimmers (Libellulidae)	Orthetrum brunneum	southern skimmer (sinji modrač)		LC		Orthetrum brunneum
Skimmers (Libellulidae)	Orthetrum cancellatum	black-tailed skimmer (prodni modrač)		LC		Orthetrum cancellatum
Skimmers (Libellulidae)	Orthetrum coerulescens	keeled skimmer (mali modrač)		LC		Orthetrum coerulescens
Skimmers (Libellulidae)	Selysiothemis nigra	black pennant (temni slaniščar)		LC	First sighted in 2012 at Škocjanski zatok nature reserve near Koper; not yet included in the official Red list.	Selysiothemis nigra
Skimmers (Libellulidae)	Sympetrum danae	black darter (črni kamenjak)	E*	LC		Sympetrum danae
Skimmers (Libellulidae)	Sympetrum depressiusculum	spotted darter (stasiti kamenjak)	E*	NE		Sympetrum depressiusculum
Skimmers (Libellulidae)	Sympetrum flaveolum	yellow-winged darter (rumeni kamenjak)	R*	LC		Sympetrum flaveolum
Skimmers (Libellulidae)	Sympetrum fonscolombii	red-veined darter (malinovordeči kamenjak)		LC		Sympetrum fonscolombii
Skimmers (Libellulidae)	Sympetrum meridionale	southern darter (sredozemski kamenjak)	R*	LC		Sympetrum meridionale
Skimmers (Libellulidae)	Sympetrum pedemontanum	banded darter (pasasti kamenjak)	R*	LC		Sympetrum pedemontanum
Skimmers (Libellulidae)	Sympetrum sanguineum	ruddy darter (krvavordeči kamenjak)		LC		Sympetrum sanguineum
Skimmers (Libellulidae)	Sympetrum striolatum	common darter (progasti kamenjak)		LC		Sympetrum striolatum
Skimmers (Libellulidae)	Sympetrum vulgatum	vagrant darter (navadni kamenjak)		LC		Sympetrum vulgatum

=== Excluded species ===
The Slovene Atlas mentions four additional species as records from older literature, but there is insufficient evidence for their presence so they are excluded from that list as well:

- Irish damselfly (Coenagrion lunulatum) – one recorded sighting in the 1950s, but Slovenia lies far outside the species' distribution range so it was most likely misidentified
- large pincertail (Onychogomphus uncatus) – one sighting with a photograph, but the specimen cannot be reliably distinguished from the similar Onychogomphus forcipatus in the picture
- golden-ringed dragonfly (Cordulegaster boltonii) – records from the 1950s belong to Cordulegaster heros which was formally split from C. boltonii in 1979
- northern white-faced darter (Leucorrhinia rubicunda) – one doubtful sighting
