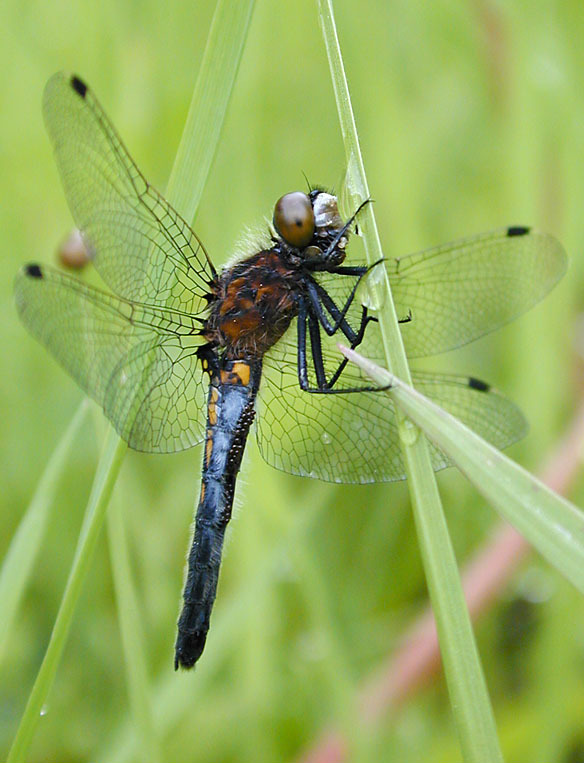

Scientific classification
- Kingdom: Animalia
- Phylum: Arthropoda
- Clade: Pancrustacea
- Class: Insecta
- Order: Odonata
- Infraorder: Anisoptera
- Family: Libellulidae
- Genus: Leucorrhinia
- Species: L. intacta

Binomial name
- Leucorrhinia intacta (Hagen, 1861)

= Dot-tailed whiteface =

Species of dragonfly

The dot-tailed whiteface (Leucorrhinia intacta) is a species of dragonfly in the family Libellulidae. It is also one of the most common and widespread in the genus Leucorrhinia.

== Identification ==
=== Naiad ===
The naiad of the dot-tailed whiteface is very small with a length of 9/16 to 3/4 inch (14–19 mm). Its abdomen is rounded, giving it a short, stocky appearance known as the sprawler form. Its brown in color and marked with either three dark stripes or two rows of dark spots running the length of the underside of the abdomen. There are needle-shaped hooks on the top of abdominal segments three through eight, and a single, rear-facing spine on each side of abdominal segments eight and nine.

=== Adult ===
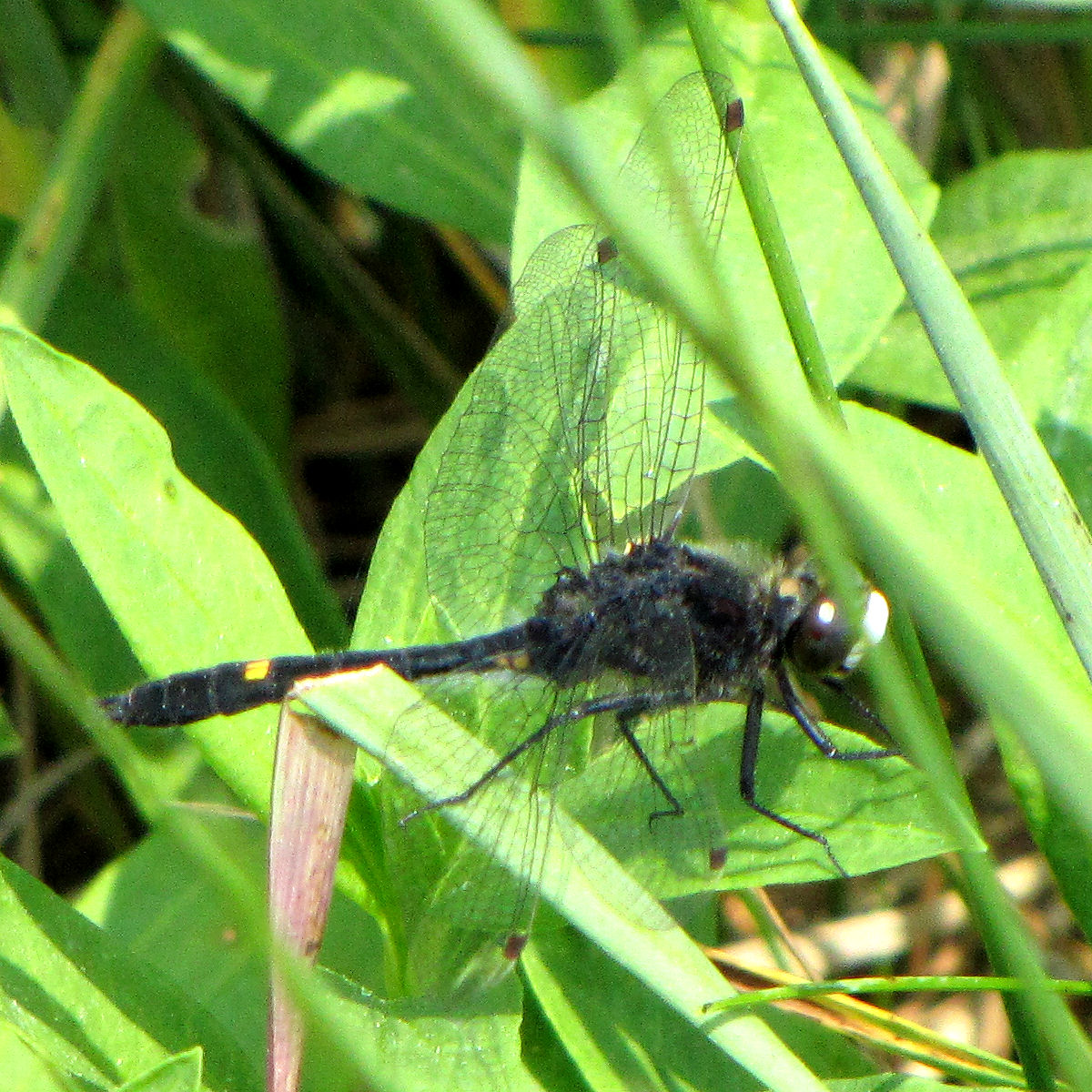
Ottawa, Ontario

The dot-tailed whiteface is a small dragonfly with a length of 1 to 1^{1}/_{5} inches (25 to 38 mm). It is distinguished by the mostly black body, small black basal wing spots, black legs, and white face. Male dot-tailed whitefaces have one yellow spot on the dorsal side of the abdomen. Female dot-tailed whitefaces have multiple yellow spots along the dorsal side of the abdomen and the last yellow spot is large and square shaped. There is also a small yellow stripe along the lateral edge in the middle of the abdomen. In both sexes, the abdomen has been known to fade when they age.

== Distribution ==
- United States: Alaska(California • Colorado • Connecticut • Delaware • Iowa • Idaho • Illinois • Indiana • Kansas • Kentucky • Massachusetts • Maryland • Maine • Michigan • Minnesota • Missouri • Montana • Nebraska • North Dakota • New Hampshire • New Jersey • Ohio • Oregon • Pennsylvania • Rhode Island • South Dakota • Tennessee • U.S. Virgin Islands • Utah • Vermont • Washington • Wisconsin • West Virginia • Wyoming)
- Canada: (Alberta • British Columbia • Manitoba • New Brunswick • Nova Scotia • Nunavut • Ontario • Prince Edward Island • Quebec • Saskatchewan)

== Habitat ==
The dot-tailed whiteface can be found near boggy and marshy ponds and lakes, and beaver ponds. It also can be along farm ponds with water lilies have been known to be used frequently. On hot, sunny days, dot-tailed whitefaces can be found basking in clearings on the ground or on twigs.

== Flight season ==
This dragonfly is most active through early May to late August.

== Diet ==
=== Naiad ===
Naiads of this species feed on a wide variety of aquatic insects, such as many mosquito larvae, other aquatic fly larvae, mayfly larvae, and freshwater shrimp. They also feed on small fish and tadpoles.

=== Adult ===
This dragonfly species will eat almost any soft-bodied flying insect including mosquitoes, flies, butterflies, moths, mayflies, and flying ants or termites.

== Ecology ==
Naiads live in submerged vegetation. They don't actively chase prey but wait for it to pass by, a strategy which affords them protection from other predators. Naiads will emerge as adults at night. The adults generally fly from early June to early August, its sometimes different months. This whiteface prefers warmer habitats than many other whitefaces, and is often found sitting on lily pads in heavily vegetated ponds. It hunts from the shoreline vegetation, which this species perched on.

== Reproduction ==
After mating, the male will actively guard the female with whom he has mated by flying above her while she lays her eggs. He does this to prevent other males from mating with her. A female lays her eggs by dipping the tip of her abdomen in the water while hovering just above its surface.

== Similar species ==
The dot-tailed whiteface has many similar-looking species. The Hudsonian whiteface is usually smaller but can be very similar to this species. This dragonfly is similar to Sympetrum species in appearance and behavior in some cases. It is also similar to the red-waisted whiteface, crimson-ringed whiteface, Canada whiteface, and boreal whiteface.

== Conservation ==
Populations of dot-tailed whitefaces are widespread, abundant, and secure.
