= Tihu Nature Reserve =

Protected area in Estonia

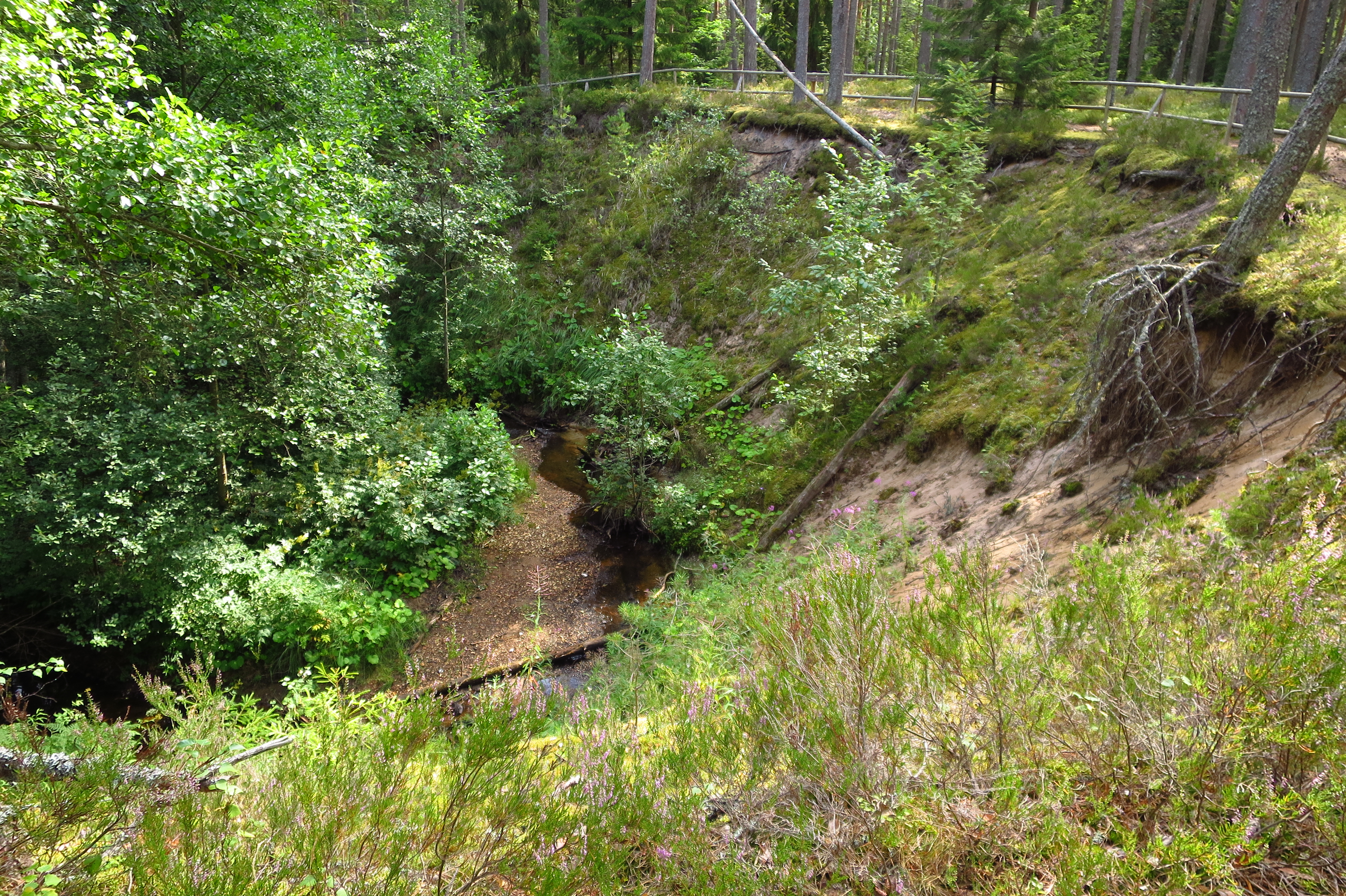

- Location within Estonia
- Location: Estonia
- Nearest city: Kärdla
- Coordinates: 58°52′16″N 22°31′02″E
- Area: 1,399 ha (3,460 acres)

Tihu Nature Reserve is a nature reserve situated on Hiiumaa in western Estonia, in Hiiu County.

The nature reserve encompasses two lakes, Tihu and Vanajõe, Õngu mire, and an area of old-growth forest. The lakes form an important habitat for sea trout; the fish spawn in fresh water. The area is also a habitat for several unusual or threatened plants and insects, such as bog orchid, coralroot orchid, large white-faced darter and lilypad whiteface. The nature reserve is also an important habitat for the endangered European mink.
