= Hacksjön =

Lake in Botkyrka Municipality, Sweden

- Location within Stockholm
- Coordinates: 59°10′45″N 17°56′45″E
- Primary inflows: Local surface water
- Primary outflows: Kvarnsjön-Gladö, Tyresån
- Catchment area: 1.7 km^{2} (0.66 sq mi)
- Basin countries: Sweden
- Surface area: 13.3 ha (33 acres)
- Average depth: 0.6 m (2 ft 0 in)
- Max. depth: 1.3 m (4 ft 3 in)
- Water volume: 77×10^{3} m^{3} (62 acre⋅ft)
- Residence time: 0.2 years
- Shore length^{1}: 1,590 m (5,220 ft)
- Surface elevation: 50.44 m (165.5 ft)
- Islands: None
- Settlements: Botkyrka
- ^{1} Shore length is not a well-defined measure.

Hacksjön is a small lake located east of the former airport at Tullinge, in the municipality Botkyrka in southern Stockholm, Sweden. It forms the westernmost lake of one of the branches of the Tyresån lake system and is located within the Lida-Riksten Open-air Area.

With its isolated location surrounded by moorlands and forests, the lake remains relatively unaffected by human activities, which is mostly limited to precipitation and incoming nutrients from local soil. The lake is used for wireless radio-controlled boats in summers and for ice racing in winters, which have reduced the previously prominent bird life by the lake. Notwithstanding, it is classified as of considerable importance for nature conservation.

== Catchment area ==
The lake is located in a marshy moorland surrounded by forests. West of it is a former military airport today used for motocross and a shooting range. In a 2002 key plan, the land surrounding the lake, owned by the city of Stockholm, is intended to be transformed into one of three nature reserve within the Lida-Riksten Open-air Area forming one of the important green wedges of Stockholm. Encompassing 240 hectares, it is marked as "conservation of rural area" and "larger area valuable for open-air life". Additionally, the area is considered as of significant archaeological interest since it 8.000 years ago, during the Stone Age, was an archipelago composed of sparsely scattered islands and thus contains many traces of the earliest settlements in Stockholm. The area between the lake and the golf course south of it is considered as of great importance for social history since the homestead there is believed to be about 1.500 years old.

=== Environmental influence ===
The shallow lake is moderately rich in nutrients and virtually unaffected by pollution. Additionally, it is rich in humus which gives the water its dark brown colour. With a pH of 7,3, the lake is unlikely to acidified.

== Flora and fauna ==
Aquatic plants thriving in the shallow lake include bladderwort, common club-rush, and water lilies. The quagmire bordering the lake, dominated by peat moss and reed, also include sedges, marsh willowherb, common marsh bedstraw, mare's tail, gypsywort, bog-myrtle, white water-lily, milk parsley, broad-leaved pondweed, marsh cinquefoil, grey sallow, common club-rush, bur-reed, narrow leaf cattail, and broadleaf cattail.

Open-air and motor sport activities have driven away a range of birds species once abundant by the lake, including the colony of black-headed gulls which once dominated it, other common species such as pochard, common teal, mute swan, Eurasian coot, and more rare visitors such as osprey and black-throated diver.

Fry of smooth newt was reported in 2000, the only amphibian reported by the lake. An inventory of damselflies in 1997 resulted in a list of emerald damselfly, red-eyed damselfly, variable damselfly, southern hawker, brilliant emerald, four-spotted chaser, eastern white-faced darter, and black darter. A second inventory in 2000 produced the following list interpreted as a normal amount of species: common hawker, brown hawker, Irish damselfly, variable damselfly, downy emerald, red-eyed damselfly, northern white-faced darter, brilliant emerald, and black darter.
