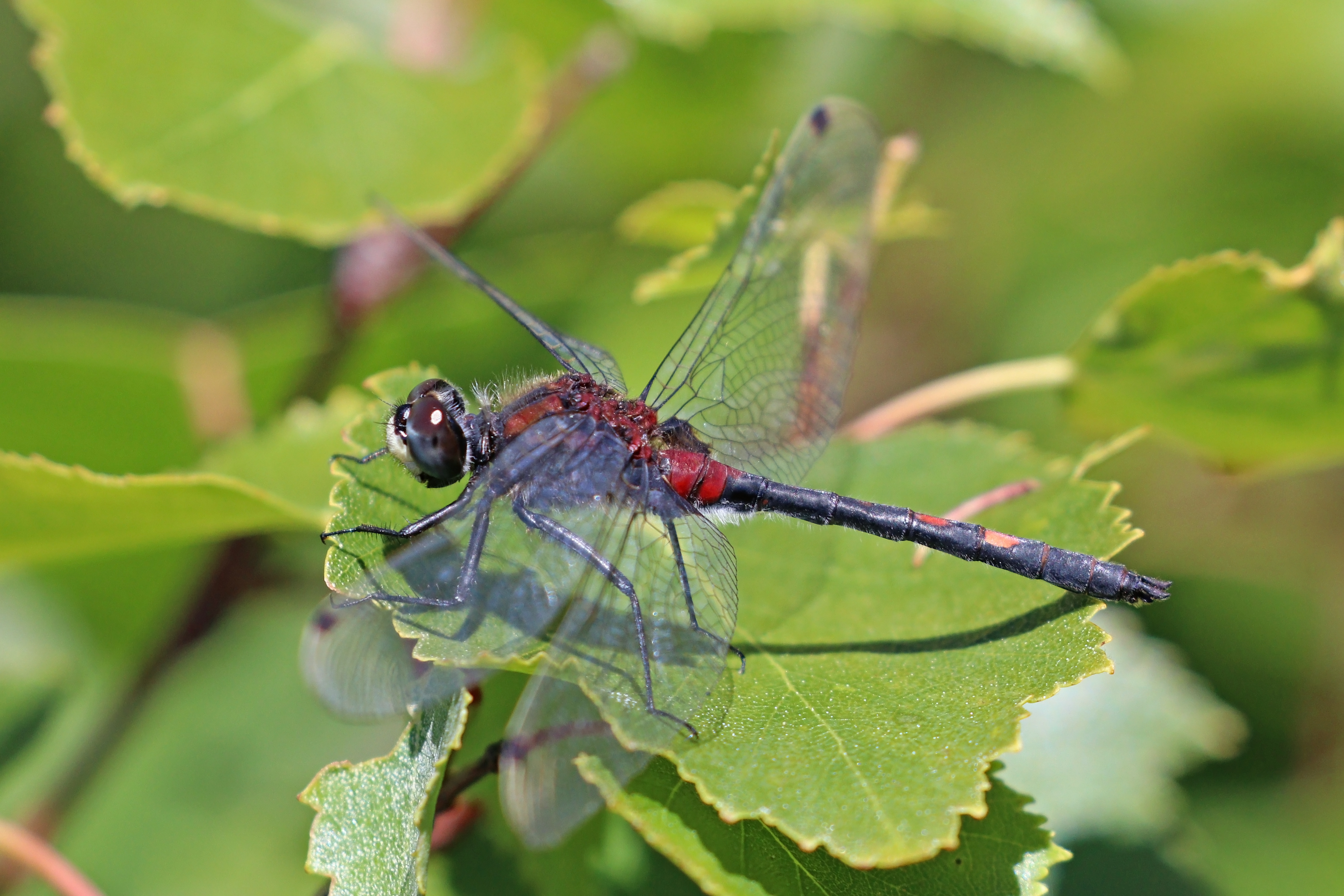
- Leucorrhinia rubicunda (Ruby whiteface) male

Scientific classification
- Kingdom: Animalia
- Phylum: Arthropoda
- Clade: Pancrustacea
- Class: Insecta
- Order: Odonata
- Infraorder: Anisoptera
- Superfamily: Libelluloidea
- Family: Libellulidae
- Subfamily: Leucorrhiniinae
- Genus: Leucorrhinia; Brittinger, 1850

= Leucorrhinia =

Whitefaces

Genus of dragonflies

Leucorrhinia is a genus of dragonfly in the family Libellulidae. They are commonly called whitefaces because of their distinctive pale frons.

== Species ==
Listed alphabetically.

Male	Female	Scientific name	Common name	Distribution
		Leucorrhinia albifrons (Burmeister, 1839)	dark whiteface	Austria, Belarus, the Czech Republic, Denmark, Estonia, Finland, France, Germany, Kazakhstan, Latvia, Lithuania, the Netherlands, Norway, Poland, Russia, Slovakia, Sweden, Switzerland, and Ukraine.
		Leucorrhinia borealis Hagen, 1890	boreal whiteface	North America
		Leucorrhinia caudalis (Charpentier, 1840)	lilypad whiteface	Austria, Belarus, Belgium, Croatia, the Czech Republic, Denmark, Estonia, Finland, France, Germany, Hungary, Latvia, Lithuania, Luxembourg, the Netherlands, Norway, Poland, Russia, Serbia and Montenegro, Slovenia, Sweden, and Ukraine.
		Leucorrhinia circassica Bartenev, 1929		North-Western Caucasus
		Leucorrhinia dubia (Van der Linden, 1825)	white-faced darter, small whiteface	northern Europe eastwards to Siberia
		Leucorrhinia frigida Hagen, 1890	frosted whiteface	United States and southern Manitoba, Ontario, Quebec, and New Brunswick.
		Leucorrhinia glacialis Hagen, 1890	crimson-ringed whiteface	North America
		Leucorrhinia hudsonica (Selys, 1850)	Hudsonian whiteface	northern West Virginia
		Leucorrhinia intacta (Hagen, 1861)	dot-tailed whiteface	United States (Alaska, California, Colorado, Connecticut, Delaware, Iowa, Idaho, Illinois, Indiana, Kansas, Kentucky, Massachusetts, Maryland, Maine, Michigan, Minnesota, Missouri, Montana, Nebraska, North Dakota, New Hampshire, New Jersey, Ohio, Oregon, Pennsylvania, Rhode Island, South Dakota, Tennessee, U.S. Virgin Islands, Utah, Vermont, Washington, Wisconsin, West Virginia, Wyoming), Canada: (Alberta, British Columbia, Manitoba, New Brunswick, Nova Scotia • Nunavut, Ontario, Prince Edward Island, Quebec, Saskatchewan)
		Leucorrhinia intermedia Bartenev, 1912		Japan
		Leucorrhinia orientalis Selys, 1887		Russia
		Leucorrhinia patricia Walker, 1940	Canada whiteface	North America
		Leucorrhinia pectoralis (Charpentier, 1825)	large white-faced darter, yellow-spotted whiteface	western Siberia to parts of France.
		Leucorrhinia proxima Calvert, 1890	red-waisted whiteface, belted whiteface	
		Leucorrhinia rubicunda (Linnaeus, 1758)	ruby whiteface	Northern Belgium and it is found through Germany, Poland, Czech Republic, Fennoscandia, Belarus, Ukraine and Russia.
