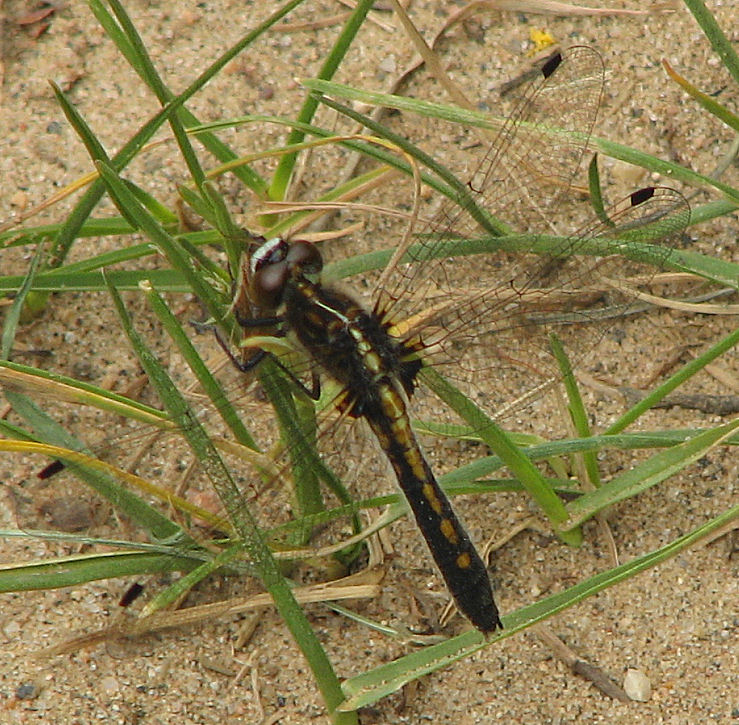
- female, Madawaska River, Ontario
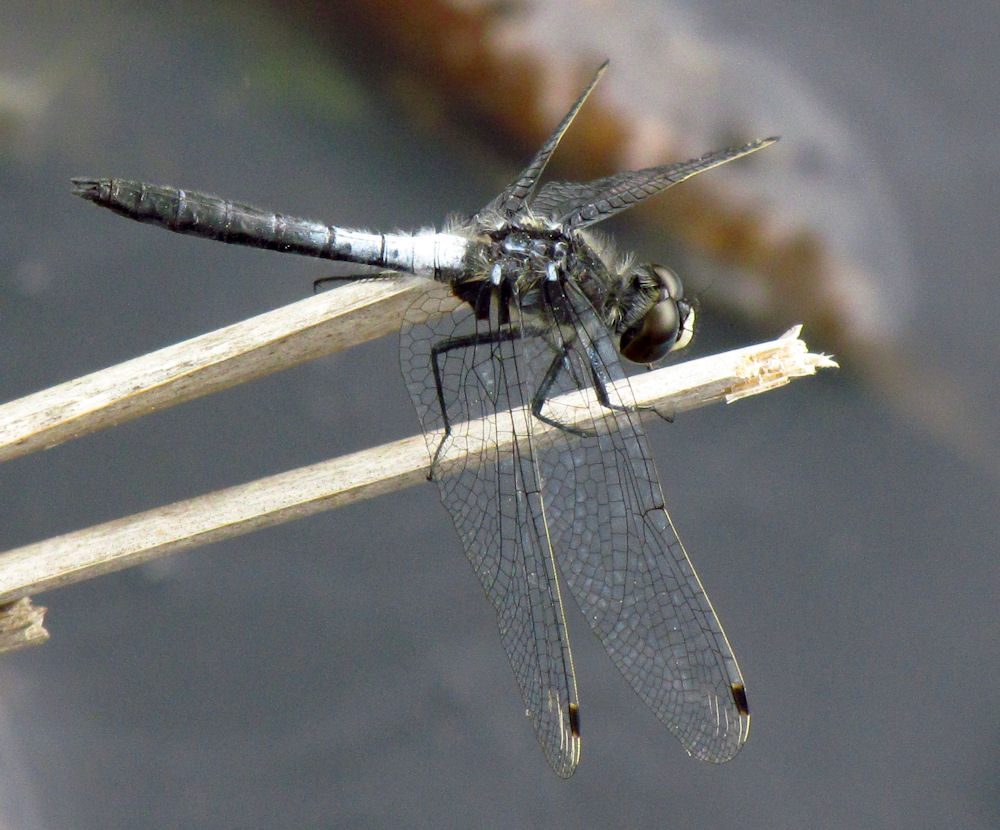
- male, Mer Bleue Conservation Area, Ontario

Conservation status
- Least Concern (IUCN 3.1)

Scientific classification
- Kingdom: Animalia
- Phylum: Arthropoda
- Class: Insecta
- Order: Odonata
- Infraorder: Anisoptera
- Family: Libellulidae
- Genus: Leucorrhinia
- Species: L. frigida

Binomial name
- Leucorrhinia frigida (Hagen, 1890)

= Leucorrhinia frigida =

Frosted whiteface

Species of dragonfly

Leucorrhinia frigida, the frosted whiteface, is a species of dragonfly in the family Libellulidae. It is found in northeastern United States and southern Manitoba, Ontario, Quebec, and New Brunswick.
