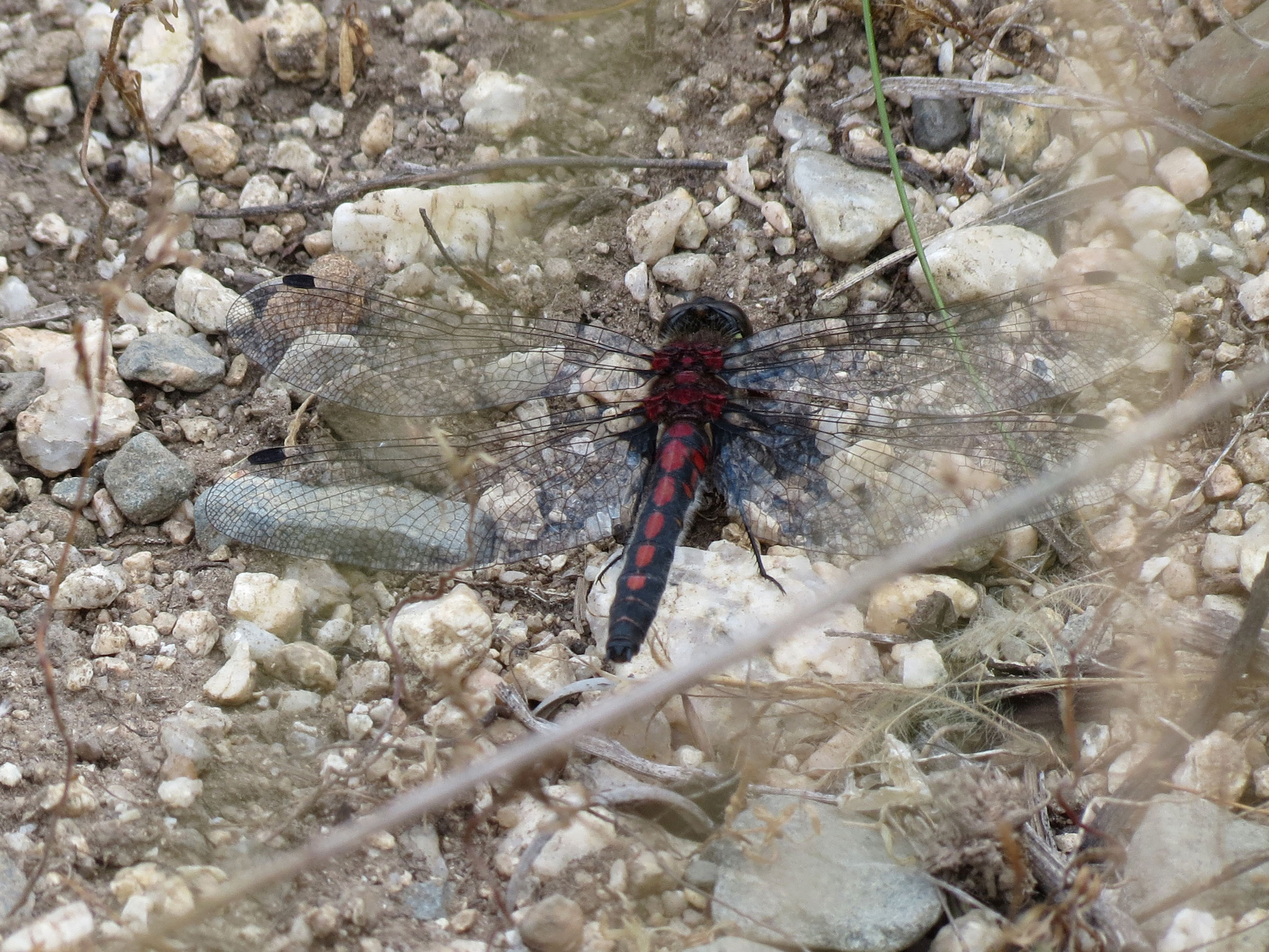
- Male
- Female

Scientific classification
- Kingdom: Animalia
- Phylum: Arthropoda
- Clade: Pancrustacea
- Class: Insecta
- Order: Odonata
- Suborder: Anisoptera
- Superfamily: Libelluloidea
- Family: Libellulidae
- Genus: Leucorrhinia
- Species: L. hudsonica

Binomial name
- Leucorrhinia hudsonica (Selys, 1850)

= Hudsonian whiteface =

Species of dragonfly

The Hudsonian whiteface (Leucorrhinia hudsonica) is a species of dragonfly in the family Libellulidae. Its common name comes from where it is found, Hudson Bay.

== Identification ==
=== Adult ===
The Hudsonian whiteface has a length of 27 to 30 mm (1.1 to 1.2 in). Male dragonflies are black and marked with red on the thorax and the abdomen. The elongated spots on the abdomen are possibly pointed on one end, this forms a line along the length of the top side of the abdomen. The female is a dark brownish color and marked similarly to the male except the markings are yellow instead of black. Both sexes have creamy white faces.

=== Naiad ===
The naiad of the Hudsonian whiteface has a length of 16 to 18 millimetres (0.63 to 0.71 in). Its abdomen is rounded, which gives it a short, stocky appearance known as the sprawler form. Naiads are brown with three dark stripes marking the length below the abdomen. In some cases, there are tiny hooks on abdominal segments three through six. Every side of abdominal segments eight and nine has a spine that points out away from the abdomen.

== Distribution ==
The Hudsonian whiteface is found in an area stretching from Alaska to Labrador and from the Hudson Bay to northern West Virginia.

== Habitat ==
Hudsonian whitefaces are usually found at vegetated ponds, sloughs, sand-bottom lakes, bogs, and fens. The bogs are at higher elevations.

== Flight season ==
These dragonflies have a flight season to early May to late August.

== Diet ==
=== Adult ===
These dragonflies will feed on almost any soft-bodied flying insect such as mosquitoes, flies, butterflies, moths, mayflies, and flying ants or termites.

=== Naiad ===
The naiad of the Hudsonian whiteface has a wide variety diet. They feed on aquatic insects, such as mosquito larvae, other aquatic fly larvae, mayfly larvae, and freshwater shrimp. They sometimes eat small fish and tadpoles.

== Ecology ==
The naiads of these dragonflies live in submerged vegetation. They do not actively pursue prey but wait for it to pass by. This strategy affords them protection from other predators. Naiads change to adults at night. Many records of this species is sparse, adults are believed to fly from late May to mid-August. They also fly at different times. The hunting occurs from the shoreline vegetation, where this species perches. Many specimen from Idaho tend to be larger than those found further north in its region. Hudsonian whitefaces have been known to swarm over sphagnum bogs in the northern part of its range.

== Reproduction ==
After mating, a male guards a female to prevent other males from mating with her. He does this by flying above her while she laying her eggs. It drives away other potential mates or maybe dragonflies of other species. The female lays her eggs by dipping the tip of her abdomen in the water while hovering above the surface.

== Similar species ==
Hudsonian whitefaces are similar to Sympetrum species in appearance and behavior in some cases. Species within this genus are similar-looking and change in appearance as they age.

== Conservation ==
Populations of this species are widespread, abundant, and secure.
