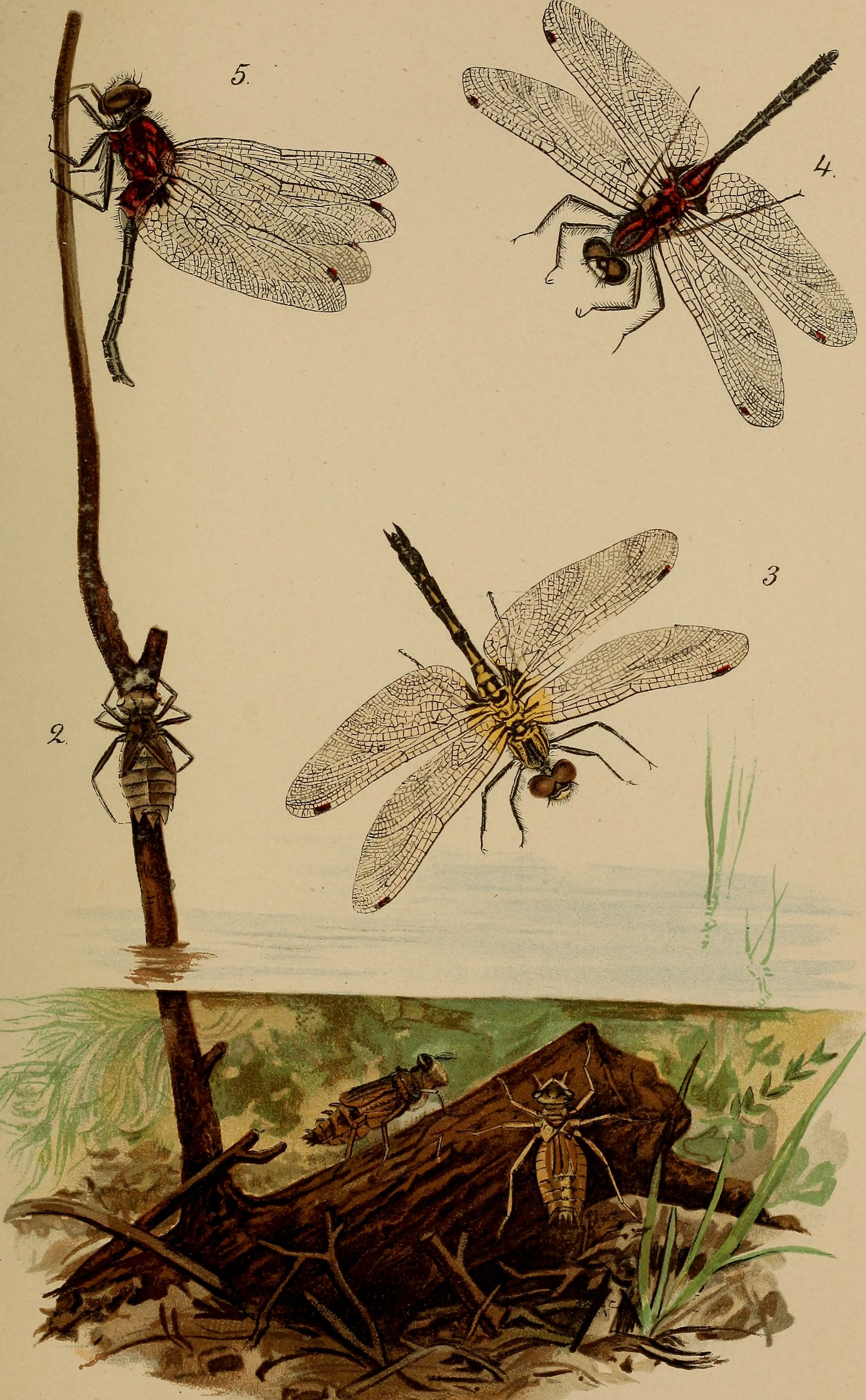

Conservation status
- Least Concern (IUCN 3.1)

Scientific classification
- Kingdom: Animalia
- Phylum: Arthropoda
- Class: Insecta
- Order: Odonata
- Infraorder: Anisoptera
- Family: Libellulidae
- Genus: Leucorrhinia
- Species: L. glacialis

Binomial name
- Leucorrhinia glacialis Hagen, 1890

= Leucorrhinia glacialis =

Species of dragonfly

Leucorrhinia glacialis, the crimson-ringed whiteface, is a species of skimmer in the dragonfly family Libellulidae. It is found in North America.

The IUCN conservation status of Leucorrhinia glacialis is "LC", least concern, with no immediate threat to the species' survival. The population is stable. The IUCN status was reviewed in 2017.

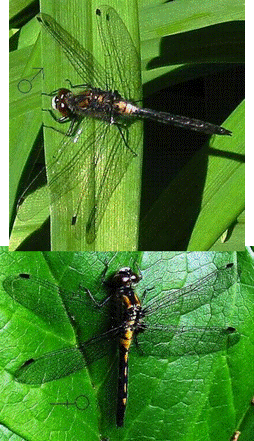
Crimson-ringed whiteface, Leucorrhinia glacialis
