= Christian Casimir Brittinger =

German entomologist (1795–1869)

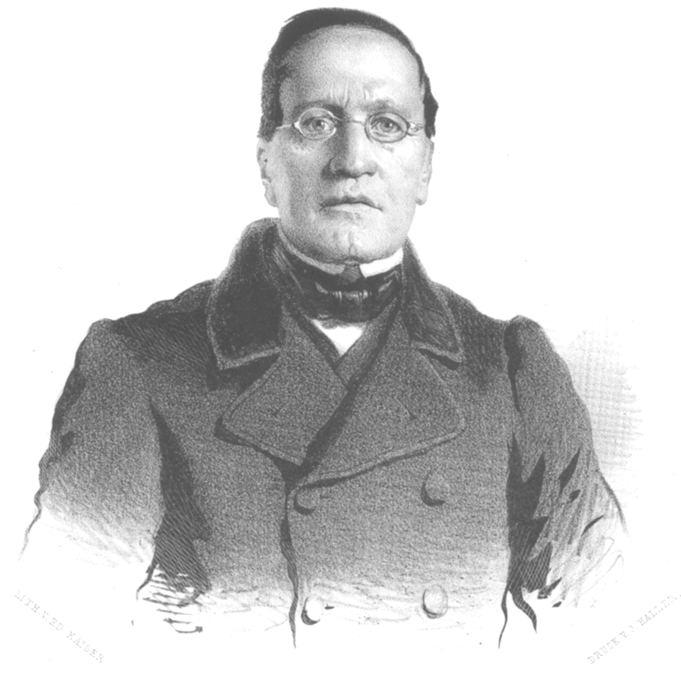
Christian Casimir Brittinger.

Christian Casimir Brittinger (30 April 1795, Friedberg – 11 January 1869, Steyr) was a German botanist, entomologist and ornithologist.

== Works ==
=== Botany ===
- Die Pflanzen der Welserhaide bei Linz, nebst Beschreibung der Polygala Moriana (Regensburger botanische Zeitung 1825.)
- Beschreibung einer Excursion auf das Wascheneck bei Spital am Pyhrn in Ober-Oesterreich. (Regensburger botanische Zeitung 1832.)
- Topographie einiger Gewächse des Traunkreises. (Regensburger botanische Zeitung 1833.)
- Botanische Notizen. (Regensburger botanische Zeitung 1841.)
- Kritische Beurtheilung yon F. Sailer's Flora yon Ober-Oesterreich. (Regensburger botanische Zeitung 1842.)
- Bemerkungen zu einer von F. Sailer neu aufgestellten Gattung aus den Gentianeen. (Musealblatt von Linz.)
- Bericht über eine von F. Sailer neu aufgestellte Gattung Danubiunculus acaulis (Botanisches Centralblatt von Dr. Rabenhorst 1846.)
- Beobachtungen über einigen Pflanzen der Flora Steyr's. (Regensburger botanische Zeitung 1859.)
- Botanische Reise auf den Pyhrgas. (Medizinische Jahrbücher des k.k. österreichischen Staates. B. 13.)

=== Entomology ===
- Die Schmetterlinge des Kronlandes Oesterreich ob der Enns. Wien, Braumüller, 1851
- Die Libelluliden des Kaiserreichs Österreich. S. B. Acad. Wiss. Wien 4, Mathem.-nat. Klasse:328-336.1850
