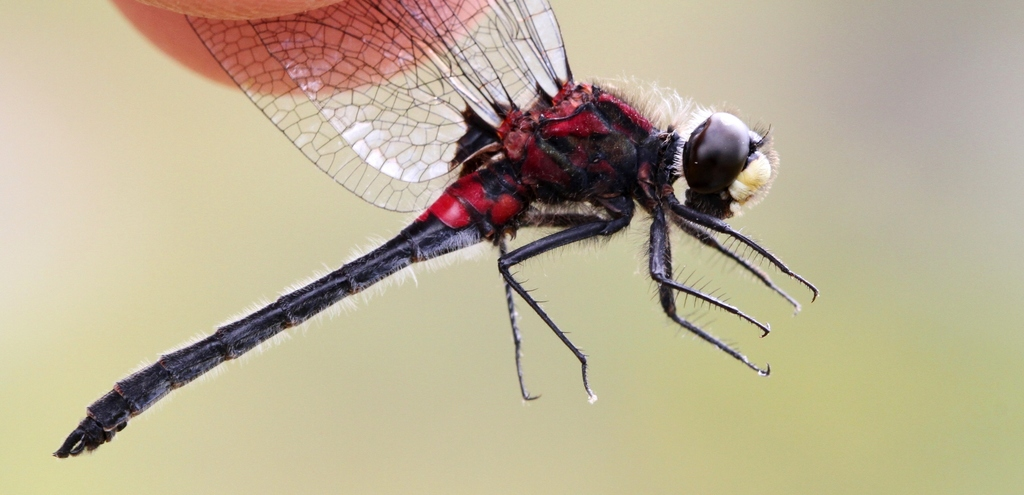

Conservation status
- Least Concern (IUCN 3.1)

Scientific classification
- Kingdom: Animalia
- Phylum: Arthropoda
- Class: Insecta
- Order: Odonata
- Infraorder: Anisoptera
- Family: Libellulidae
- Genus: Leucorrhinia
- Species: L. patricia

Binomial name
- Leucorrhinia patricia Walker, 1940

= Leucorrhinia patricia =

Species of dragonfly

Leucorrhinia patricia, the Canada whiteface, is a species of skimmer in the family Libellulidae. It is found in North America.

The IUCN conservation status of Leucorrhinia patricia is "LC", least concern, with no immediate threat to the species' survival. The population is stable.
