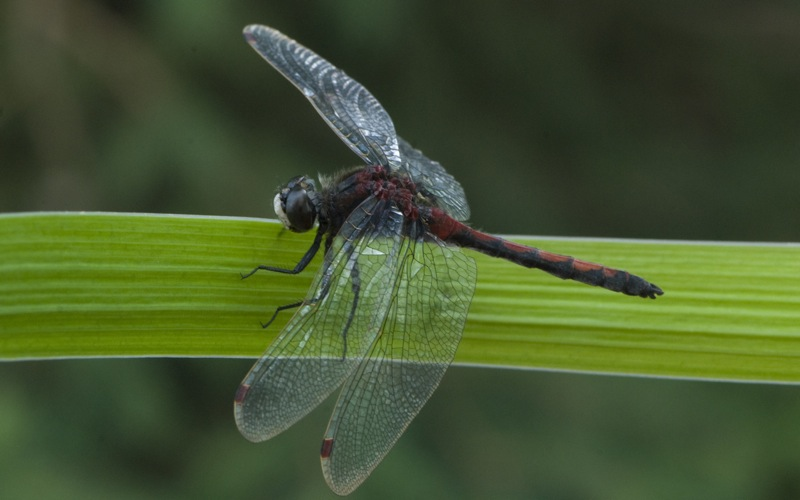

Conservation status
- Least Concern (IUCN 3.1)

Scientific classification
- Kingdom: Animalia
- Phylum: Arthropoda
- Class: Insecta
- Order: Odonata
- Infraorder: Anisoptera
- Family: Libellulidae
- Genus: Leucorrhinia
- Species: L. borealis

Binomial name
- Leucorrhinia borealis Hagen, 1890

= Leucorrhinia borealis =

Species of dragonfly

Leucorrhinia borealis, the boreal whiteface, is a species of skimmer in the dragonfly family Libellulidae. It is found in North America.

The IUCN conservation status of Leucorrhinia borealis is "LC", least concern, with no immediate threat to the species' survival. The population is stable. The IUCN status was reviewed in 2017.
