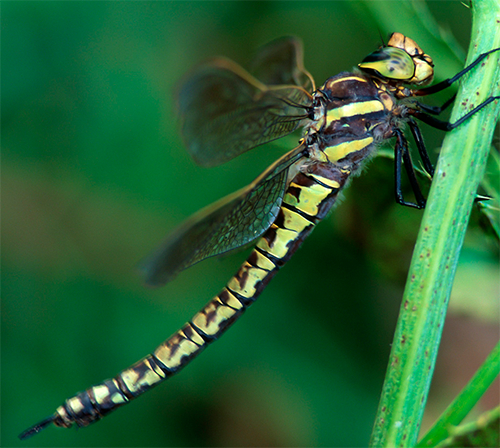

Conservation status
- Least Concern (IUCN 3.1)

Scientific classification
- Domain: Eukaryota
- Kingdom: Animalia
- Phylum: Arthropoda
- Class: Insecta
- Order: Odonata
- Infraorder: Anisoptera
- Family: Aeshnidae
- Genus: Aeshna
- Species: A. serrata

Binomial name
- Aeshna serrata Hagen, 1856

Synonyms
- Aeshna osiliensis Mierzejewski, 1913; Aeshna serrata subsp. osiliensis Mierzejewski, 1913

= Baltic hawker =

Species of dragonfly

The Baltic hawker (Aeshna serrata) is a species of hawker dragonfly native to eastern Europe and western Asia.
