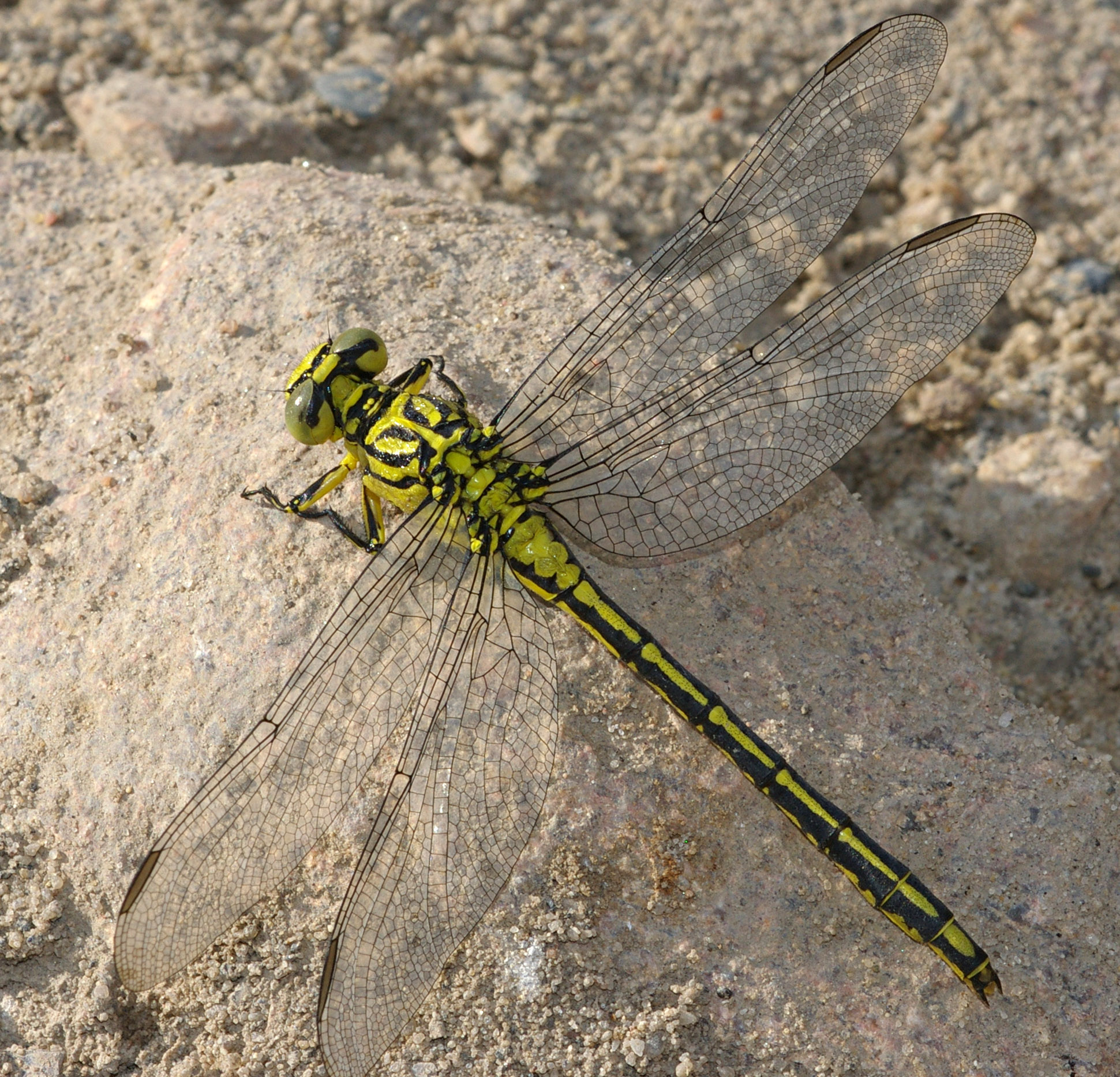

Scientific classification
- Kingdom: Animalia
- Phylum: Arthropoda
- Class: Insecta
- Order: Odonata
- Infraorder: Anisoptera
- Family: Gomphidae
- Genus: Gomphus
- Species: G. flavipes

Binomial name
- Gomphus flavipes Charpentier, 1825

Synonyms
- Stylurus flavipes

= Gomphus flavipes =

Species of dragonfly

Gomphus flavipes, the river clubtail or yellow-legged dragonfly, is a species of dragonfly in the family Gomphidae. It is found in Europe. Its natural habitat are rivers and large streams. The dragonfly flies from June to September depending on the location.

== Geographical distribution ==
Gomphus flavipes is a European species. It has the biggest geographical range among the European Gomphid species, occurring from France to eastern Siberia. The species has a very patchy occurrence in Central Europe and has become rare in Western Europe. The southernmost occurrence is known from Greece. In Southern Europe G. flavipes is replaced by other Gomphid species. However, the exact geographical range of the species is still unclear.

== Habitat ==
Gomphus flavipes lives along the middle and lower reaches of slow flowing medium-sized and big rivers The species prefers riverbed with mud, clay, loam or fine sand as soil, since larvae develop buried in the soil, but avoids areas with decomposition of organic matter and oxygen-poor stagnant water. Reaches with high drift and coarse substrate are also avoided, however, occasionally G. flavipes can be found in bigger lakes with high oxygen content.

== Morphology ==
As a medium-sized dragonfly G. flavipes is 50–55 mm long and with an average wingspan of 70–80 mm. The eyes are widely separated, this is a typical genus-specific feature, males have blue while females have green eyes. Both sexes have predominantly yellow legs and the males has thin angled appendages, while his 10th segment is entirely black dorsally.

== Behaviour and life cycle ==
Gomphus flavipes, as all dragonflies, are predators; they capture smaller insect in flight. Imagos are rarely seen, the easiest way to observe them is in the mating period or during the emergence of young adults. Mating usually takes place in June or July. During the day adult males search for females, far from the riverbank, in low altitude above the waterfront. If they successfully catch a female copulation takes place in the shelter of water edge willows. After fertilization females fly 20–30 cm above the water and lay eggs (one at a time or in a small packets) into the water.

== Larval development ==
The larvae develop for three years buried in the fine soil of the riverbed. As imagos, they are predators too, their diet consisting of small invertebrates which they capture with they specialized labium called the mask. The emergence of the larvae starts mostly at end of May or June, but it depends highly on location and other environmental circumstances (e.g. a rainy period could delay the start of emergence). The emergence in G. flavipes is often highly synchronised and it is therefore referred as a ’summer species’, in Odonatology EM50 values are used to describe the emergence pattern (extent of synchronization). The patterns often have two peaks in G. flavipes due to the phenomenon called ’cohort splitting’. Larvae of G. flavipes, unlike other Anisoptera larvae, often choose riverbank soil as an emergence substrate, however the type of substrate depends on location and characteristics of the riverbank, probably the larvae have no substrate specific attachment.

== Threat factors ==
Gomphus flavipes has become an endangered species in most Western European countries due to water pollution and river regulation. The species is listed in the Annex IV of Habitats Directive.
