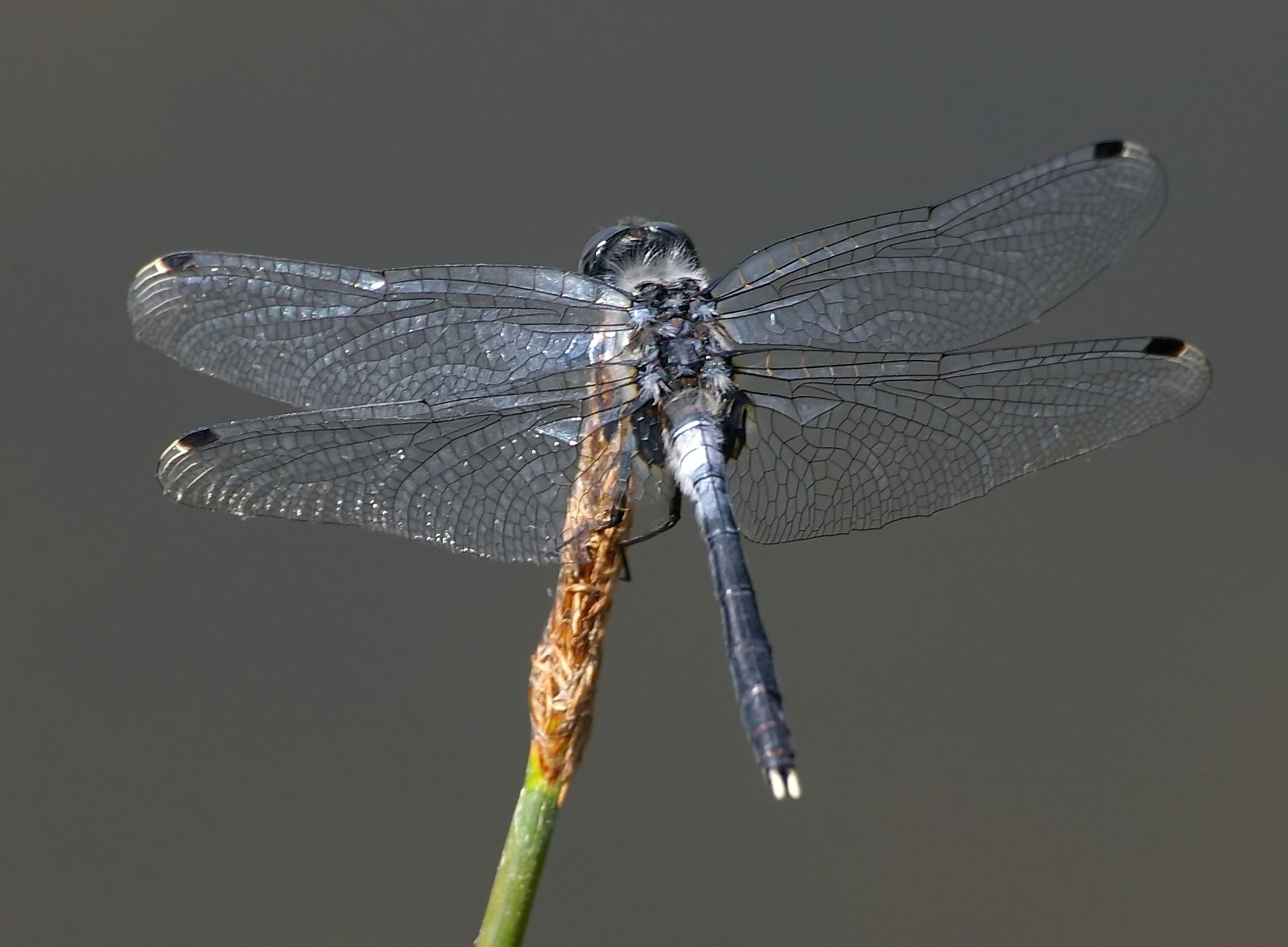

Conservation status
- Least Concern (IUCN 3.1)

Scientific classification
- Kingdom: Animalia
- Phylum: Arthropoda
- Class: Insecta
- Order: Odonata
- Infraorder: Anisoptera
- Family: Libellulidae
- Genus: Leucorrhinia
- Species: L. albifrons

Binomial name
- Leucorrhinia albifrons (Burmeister, 1839)

= Leucorrhinia albifrons =

Dark whiteface

Species of dragonfly

Leucorrhinia albifrons, the dark whiteface, is a species of dragonfly in the family Libellulidae. It is found in Austria, Belarus, the Czech Republic, Denmark, Estonia, Finland, France, Germany, Kazakhstan, Latvia, Lithuania, the Netherlands, Norway, Poland, Russia, Slovakia, Sweden, Switzerland, and Ukraine. Its natural habitats are shrub-dominated wetlands, swamps, intermittent freshwater lakes, and freshwater marshes. It is threatened by habitat loss.

== Taxonomy ==
The dark whiteface was described as Libellula caudalis by the German entomologist Hermann Burmeister in 1839. It is known in English as the dark whiteface or the eastern white-faced darter.

== Description ==
It is a medium-sized Leucorrhinia dragonfly with a dark, dull appearance. The males appear frosted bluish-grey. It can be distinguished from other species in its genus by the white patches on its labium. It is smaller and sleeker than the lilypad whiteface, with a shorter and more diffuse ring at the base of the abdomen.

== Distribution and habitat ==
The dark whiteface is a palearctic species with a range that stretches from central Siberia and the Altai Mountains to southern Scandinavia and France. It is fairly widespread in northeastern Europe and in European Russia. It is rarer in central Europe and has a patchy and fragmented range in western and southern Europe. It is also patchily distributed in the non-European portions of Russia. It was previously extirpated from the Netherlands and Denmark, but has re-established populations in those countries. It is still locally extinct in Slovakia. Although it is primarily a lowland species, it is found to elevations of 1,150 meters in the Jura and 1,400 m in the French Alps.

The dark whiteface is typically prefers nutrient-poor bodies of water with shallow, stagnant water and abundant vegetation. These include ponds, bays, acidic peaty lakes, disused gravel pits, and wetlands. It especially prefers unshaded water bodies surrounded by forest and is more patchily distributed in more open habitats. At the edges of its range, it is mainly restricted to mesotrophic lakes, but can be found in a wider range of eutrophic or nutrient-poor environments. It can survive in regions with high levels of fish as long as there is sufficient vegetation for larvae to hide in. Males are generally seen flying between water lilies, stones, or straws, from which they monitor their territory. Females and juvenile males prefer more open, sunny areas adjacent to these. Perching generally takes place on the ground or on vegetation, but rarely on lilypads like the related lilypad whiteface.

== Ecology ==
Females generally lay the eggs alone at the surface of the water. Larval development takes three years and takes place in shallow waters with rich vegetation, following which almost all dark whitefaces in a population emerge simultaneously. Adults of the species can be seen from late April (in the south of its range) or late May to mid-August and are most common in June. The dragonfly's exuviae are left on vegetation next to the water at a height of a couple dozen centimetres.

== Conservation ==
It is listed as being near-threatened on the IUCN Red List both globally and in Europe due to ongoing declines in its population throughout its range. Historically, the main threats to the species were the destruction of peat bog habitats, eutrophication, and pesticide pollution. More recently, threats to the species include nitrogen deposition and higher water temperatures caused by climate change, more frequent droughts, afforestation in wetland habitats, and the spread of invasive fish such as the pumpkinseed sunfish. The dark whiteface is listed in Annex IV of the Habitats Directive and Annex II of the Bern Convention.
