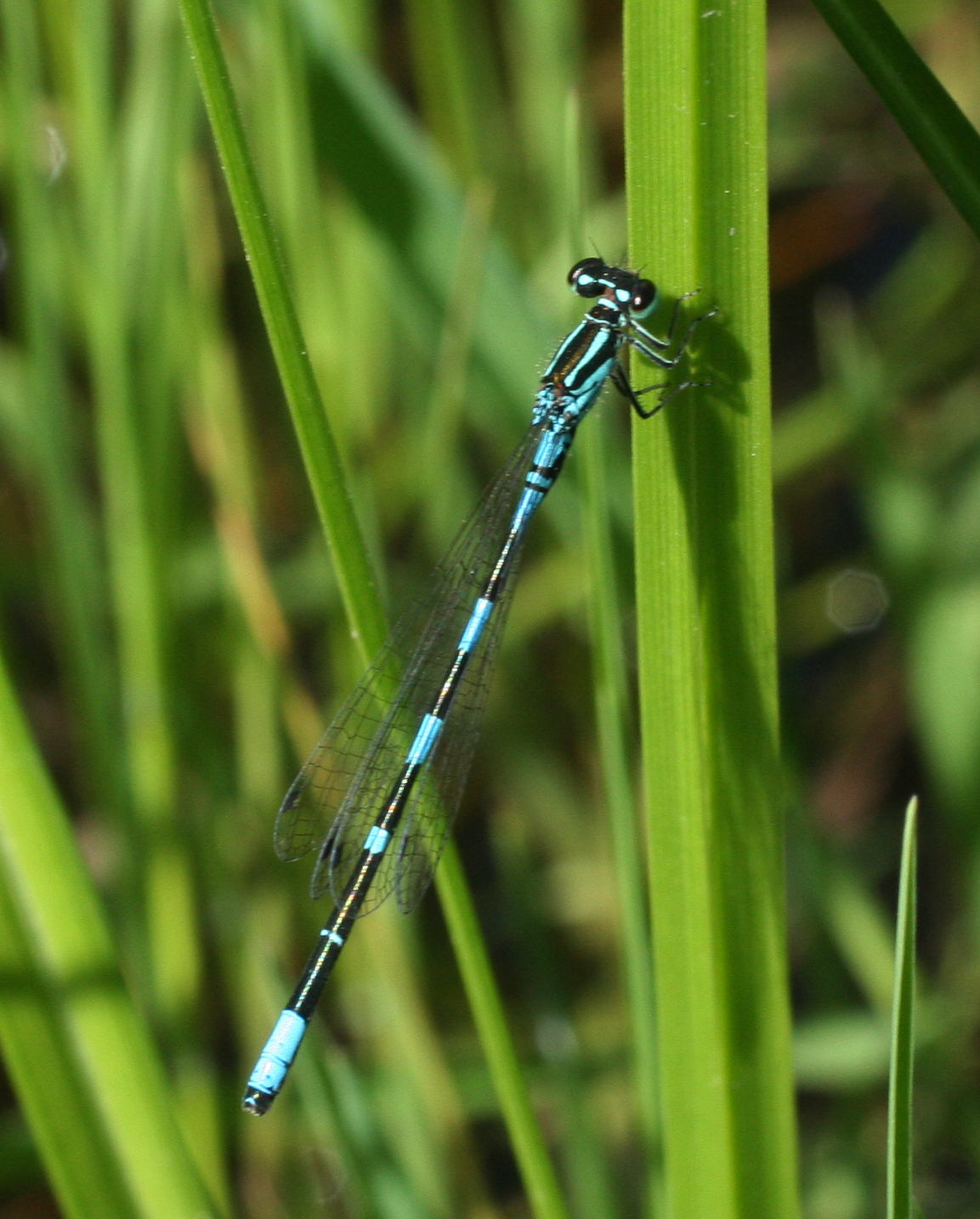

Scientific classification
- Kingdom: Animalia
- Phylum: Arthropoda
- Clade: Pancrustacea
- Class: Insecta
- Order: Odonata
- Suborder: Zygoptera
- Family: Coenagrionidae
- Genus: Coenagrion
- Species: C. johanssoni

Binomial name
- Coenagrion johanssoni (Wallengren, 1894)

Synonyms
- Coenagrion concinnum

= Arctic bluet =

Species of damselfly

The Arctic bluet (Coenagrion johanssoni) is a damselfly which is part of the family of Coenagrionidae.

== Range ==
The Arctic bluet is found in Northern Europe, and east through Asia as far as the Amur River. It is not found in Denmark. It is found in Finland and northern Sweden, but only in the mountains. It is also found in southern Norway as far north as Troms. They are common in the østlandet, but seldom in the vestlandet.

== Appearance ==
The Arctic bluet is one of the smallest damselflies in Norway. The female is very similar to the male and has smaller characteristic stripes on its back.

The wings are held behind the body. The wingspan is between 32 and 40 millimetres.
