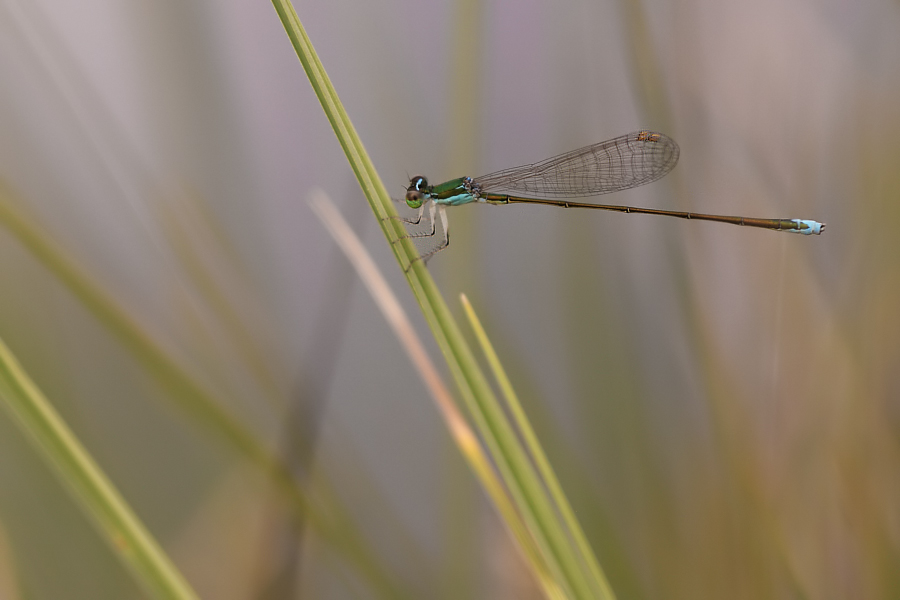
- Nehalennia speciosa (male)

Conservation status
- Vulnerable (IUCN 3.1)

Scientific classification
- Kingdom: Animalia
- Phylum: Arthropoda
- Class: Insecta
- Order: Odonata
- Suborder: Zygoptera
- Family: Coenagrionidae
- Genus: Nehalennia
- Species: N. speciosa

Binomial name
- Nehalennia speciosa (Charpentier, 1840)

= Nehalennia speciosa =

Species of damselfly

Nehalennia speciosa (pygmy damselfly, sedgeling or sedgling) is a species of damselfly in the family Coenagrionidae. It is found in Austria, Belarus, the Czech Republic, Denmark, Estonia, Finland, Germany, Italy, Japan, North Korea, Latvia, Lithuania, Luxembourg, the Netherlands, Poland, Romania, Russia, Slovakia, Sweden, Switzerland, Ukraine, possibly France, and possibly Kazakhstan. Its natural habitats are swamps, freshwater marshes, and open excavations. It is threatened by habitat loss.
