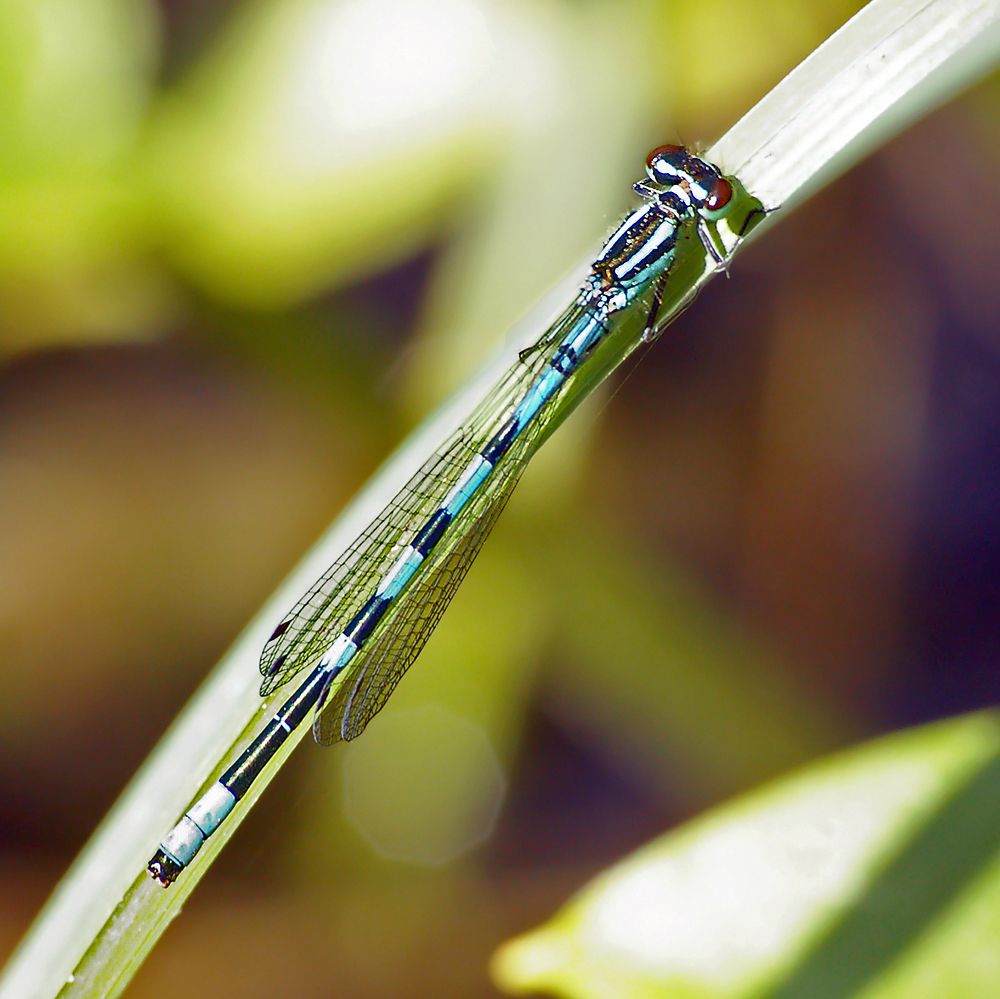

Conservation status
- Least Concern (IUCN 3.1)

Scientific classification
- Kingdom: Animalia
- Phylum: Arthropoda
- Clade: Pancrustacea
- Class: Insecta
- Order: Odonata
- Suborder: Zygoptera
- Family: Coenagrionidae
- Genus: Coenagrion
- Species: C. hastulatum

Binomial name
- Coenagrion hastulatum Charpentier, 1825

= Coenagrion hastulatum =

Species of damselfly

Coenagrion hastulatum, the northern damselfly or spearhead bluet, is a damselfly in the family Coenagrionidae.

The species is widespread and common in northern Eurasia but is restricted to elevated or bog-like sites towards the west and south. In Britain, it is confined to a few small lochans in Scotland.

Coenagrion hastulatum is 31–33 millimetres (1.2–1.3 in) long.

The specific part of the scientific name, hastulatum, from the Latin hastula (small spear) is because of the distinctive markings on the second segment of the abdomen that resembles a spear.
