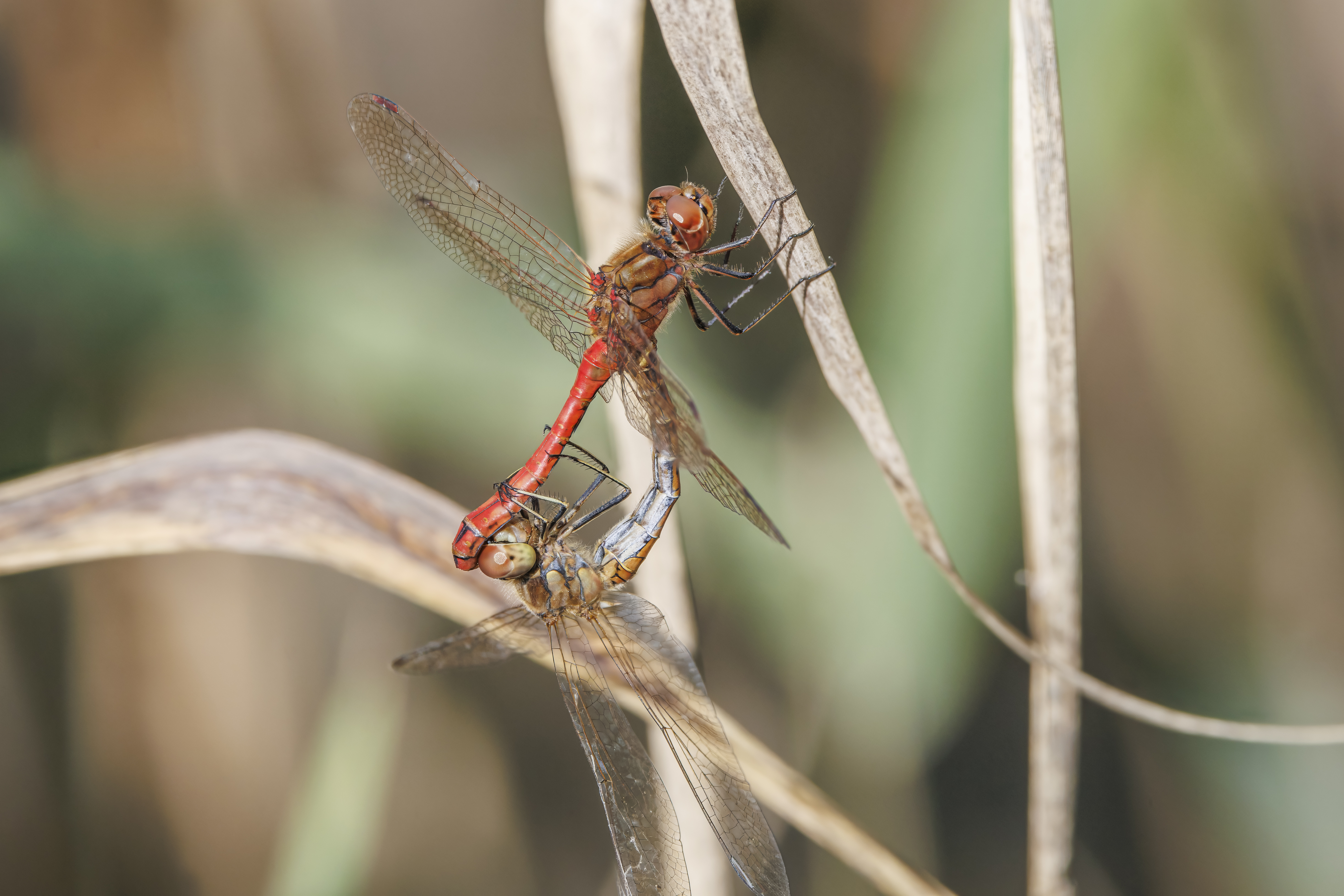
- Mating
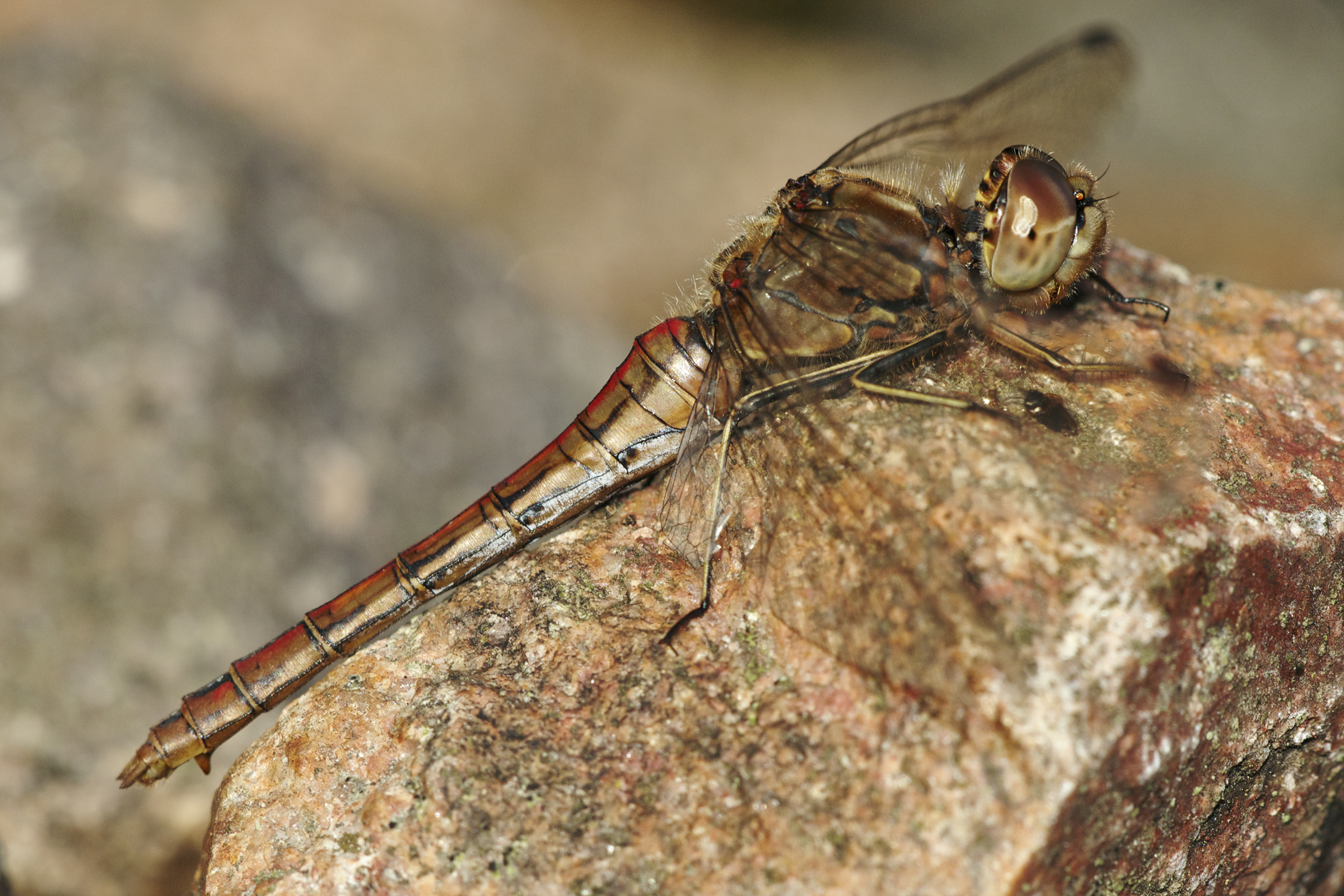
- Female

Conservation status
- Least Concern (IUCN 3.1)

Scientific classification
- Kingdom: Animalia
- Phylum: Arthropoda
- Clade: Pancrustacea
- Class: Insecta
- Order: Odonata
- Infraorder: Anisoptera
- Family: Libellulidae
- Genus: Sympetrum
- Species: S. vulgatum

Binomial name
- Sympetrum vulgatum (Linnaeus, 1758)
- Range of S. vulgatum.

= Vagrant darter =

Species of dragonfly

The vagrant darter, or moustached darter, (Sympetrum vulgatum) is a European dragonfly. The species takes its English name from its habit of occasionally appearing as a rare vagrant north of its normal range. However, it is likely to be under-recorded because it is very similar to the common darter (S. striolatum).

The species is common in central and northeast Europe. It breeds in standing water.

== Appearance ==
As stated in the common darter page, Sympetrum species are not easy to tell apart from one another. They have black moustache markings that extend down the sides of their face, giving them the moustached darter name. Males have an overall redish body, with a distinctly red thorax. Females have an orangeish-yellow body and a prominent vulva scale. Fully mature ones will have a brown pterostigma. Immature males and fully mature females can look very similar, but immature males might have a less colored pterostigma.

== Behavior ==
This is a rare migratory species that gets the name vagrant darter from its rare visits to the U.K., which is outside of regions where it is normally spotted, those being countries mostly in south-western Europe like France, Germany, and many Slavic Countries. They are oviparous, which means that the females lay undeveloped eggs that develop largely outside of the mother.
