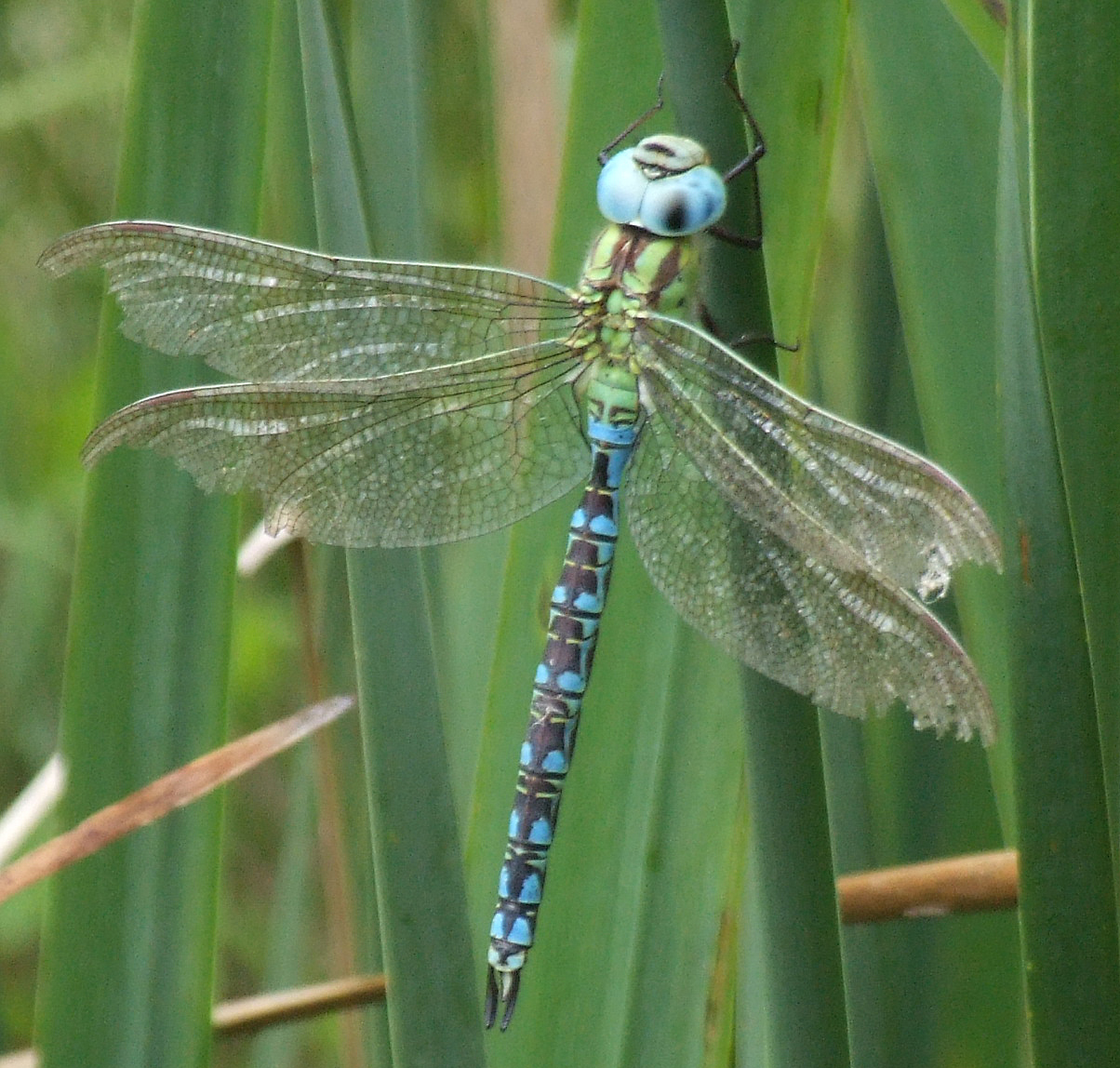

Conservation status
- Least Concern (IUCN 3.1)

Scientific classification
- Kingdom: Animalia
- Phylum: Arthropoda
- Clade: Pancrustacea
- Class: Insecta
- Order: Odonata
- Suborder: Anisoptera
- Family: Aeshnidae
- Genus: Aeshna
- Species: A. viridis

Binomial name
- Aeshna viridis Eversmann, 1836

= Aeshna viridis =

Green hawker

Species of dragonfly

Aeshna viridis, the green hawker, is a species of dragonfly in the family Aeshnidae. It is found in Austria, the Czech Republic, Denmark, Estonia, Finland, Germany, Hungary, Latvia, Lithuania, the Netherlands, Poland, Russia, Serbia and Montenegro, Slovakia, Sweden, and Ukraine. Its natural habitats are rivers, swamps, lakes, and marshes. It is threatened by habitat loss in parts of its range but in general it is not very vulnerable.
