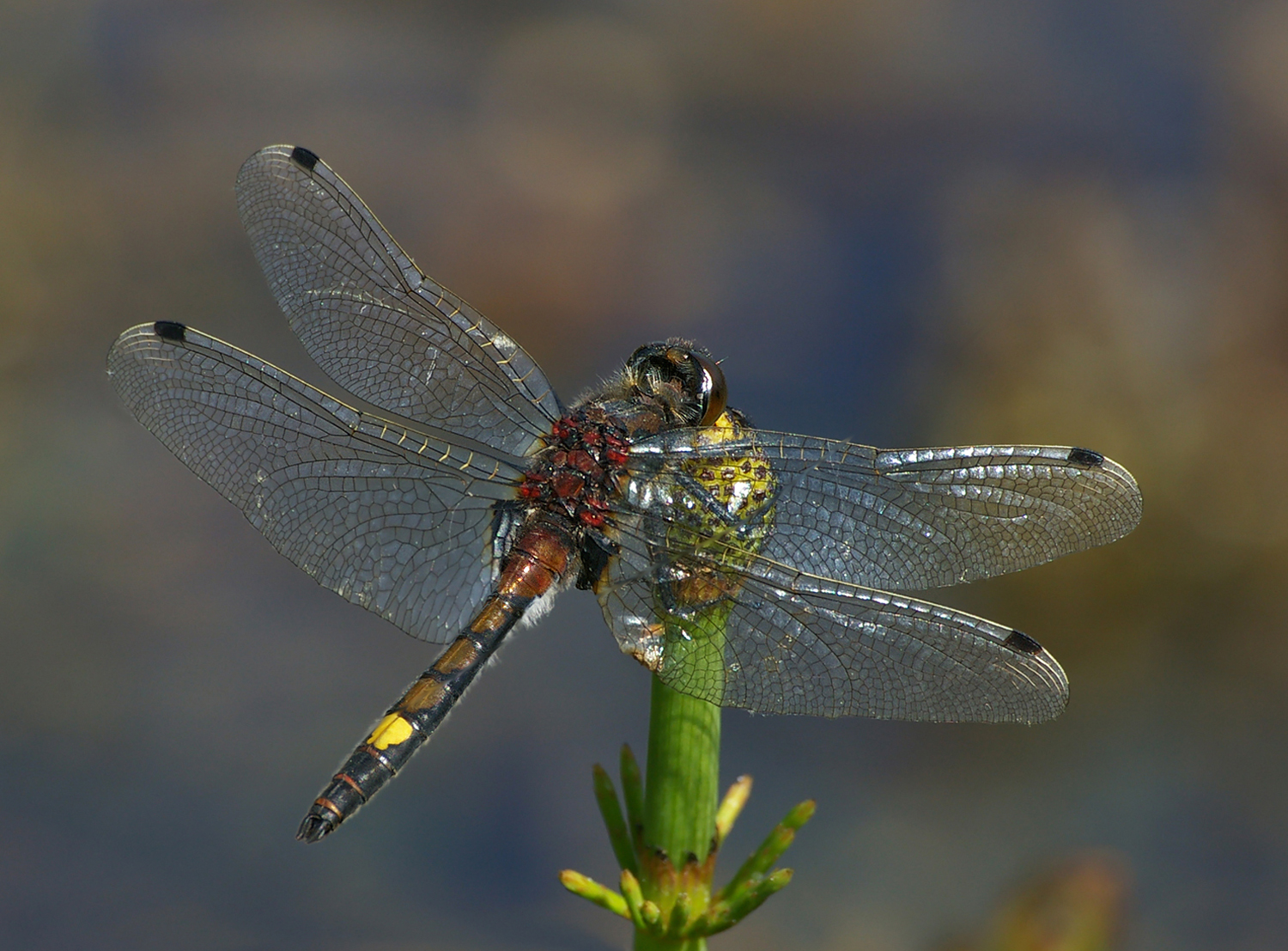

- Both males

Scientific classification
- Kingdom: Animalia
- Phylum: Arthropoda
- Clade: Pancrustacea
- Class: Insecta
- Order: Odonata
- Suborder: Anisoptera
- Superfamily: Libelluloidea
- Family: Libellulidae
- Genus: Leucorrhinia
- Species: L. pectoralis

Binomial name
- Leucorrhinia pectoralis (Charpentier, 1825)

= Large white-faced darter =

Species of dragonfly

The large white-faced darter or yellow-spotted whiteface (Leucorrhinia pectoralis) is a small dragonfly belonging to the genus Leucorrhinia in the family Libellulidae.

This species is 32–39 millimetres (1.3–1.5 in) long and is the largest member of its genus in Europe. It is easily identified by the large yellow seventh segment of its abdomen.

It inhabits marshy borders and prefers less acidic waters than its close relative the white-faced darter, (Leucorrhinia dubia). It occurs from western Siberia to parts of France. From England, there was only one record in Kent in June 1859 until two sightings in May 2012 in Suffolk.
