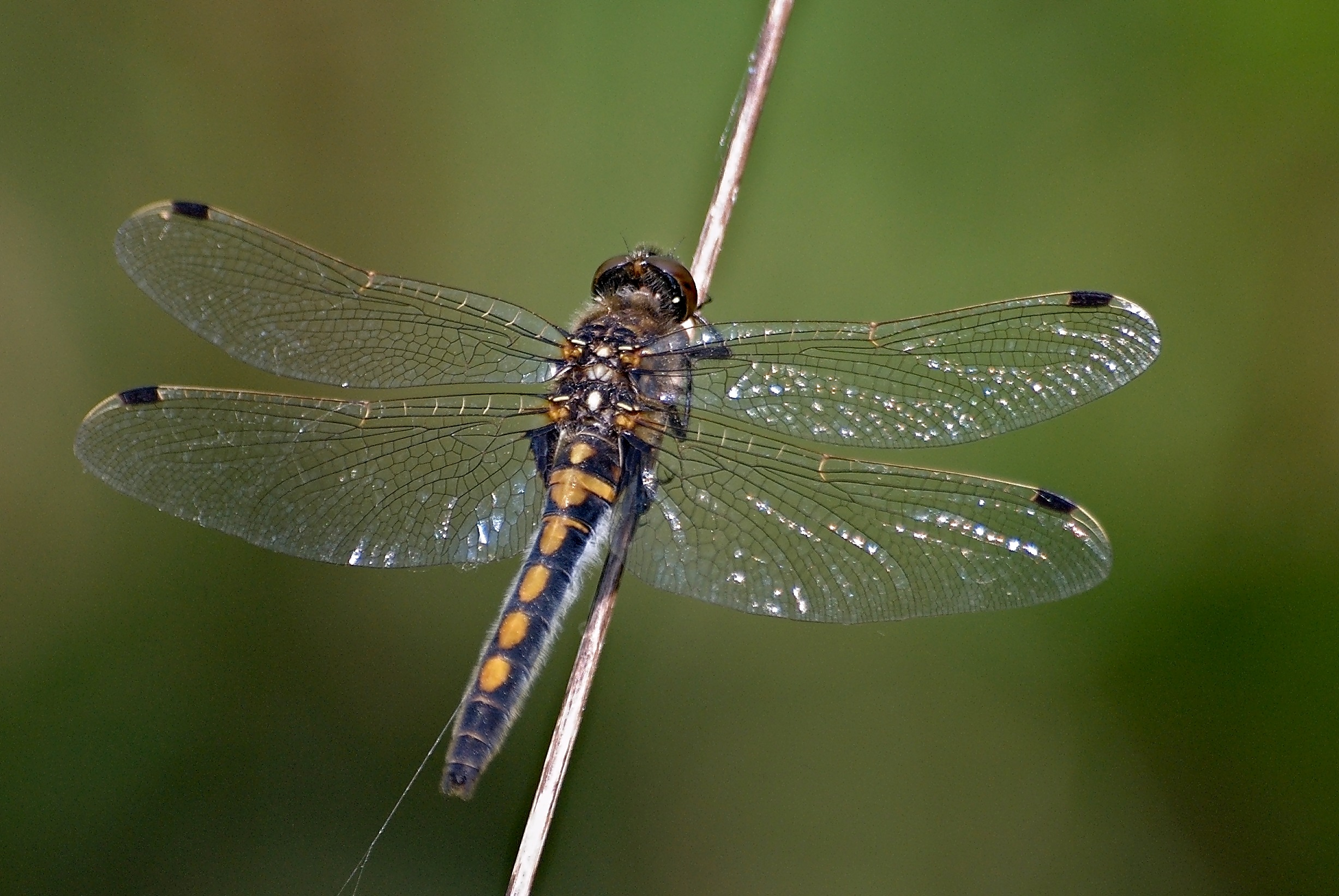

Scientific classification
- Kingdom: Animalia
- Phylum: Arthropoda
- Class: Insecta
- Order: Odonata
- Infraorder: Anisoptera
- Family: Libellulidae
- Genus: Leucorrhinia
- Species: L. rubicunda

Binomial name
- Leucorrhinia rubicunda (Linnaeus, 1758)

= Northern white-faced darter =

Species of dragonfly

The northern white-faced darter (Leucorrhinia rubicunda) or the ruby whiteface is a dragonfly found in Europe as far east as the Altai Mountains. It is predominantly northern in its distribution, being one of the few dragonflies common north of the Arctic Circle. Its most southerly location is Northern Belgium and it is found through Germany, Poland, Czech Republic, Fennoscandia, Belarus, Ukraine and Russia.

== Habitat ==
The Northern white-faced darter is commonly found in its natural habitat, around peatlands and bogs.
