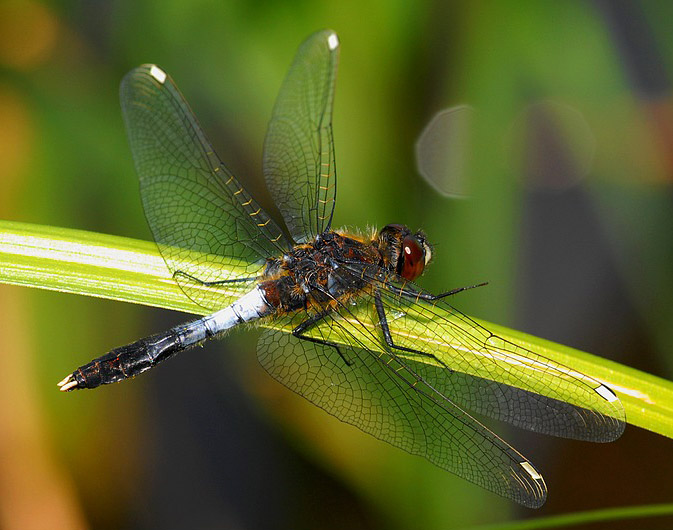

Conservation status
- Least Concern (IUCN 3.1)

Scientific classification
- Kingdom: Animalia
- Phylum: Arthropoda
- Class: Insecta
- Order: Odonata
- Infraorder: Anisoptera
- Family: Libellulidae
- Genus: Leucorrhinia
- Species: L. caudalis

Binomial name
- Leucorrhinia caudalis (Charpentier, 1840)

= Leucorrhinia caudalis =

Lilypad whiteface

Species of dragonfly

Leucorrhinia caudalis, also known as the lilypad whiteface or the dainty white-faced darter, is a species of dragonfly in the family Libellulidae. It is found in Europe. Its natural habitats are swamps and freshwater lakes. It is threatened by habitat loss.

== Taxonomy ==
The lilypad whiteface was described as Libellula caudalis by the German entomologist Toussaint von Charpentier in 1840. It is known in English as the lilypad whiteface or the dainty white-faced darter.

== Description ==
The lilypad whiteface is a large, easy-to-identify species with a broad clubtail. Males are dark with white on the face, abdomen, and the ends of the wings.

== Distribution and habitat ==
The lilypad whiteface is a palearctic species with a range that stretches from central Siberia to western Europe. It is common in Scandinavia and the Baltics, as well as eastern Europe. It was historically threatened and localised in continental Europe, but is now well-established in the western and central parts of the continent and has an increasing population with a expanding range. Its distribution in southeastern Europe is scattered, but is expanding, with newly-established populations in countries such as Bosnia and Herzegovina. The species' distribution in Russia and Ukraine is poorly known, but the species is thought to be locally common in Belarus. The lilypad whiteface was locally extinct in Wallonia, the Netherlands, Denmark, Serbia, and Czechia, but has re-established itself in the first three regions. The species has not been recorded recently from Slovenia and known populations in Hungary have apparently disappeared.

The lilypad whiteface is a lowland dragonfly found in stagnant bodies of water that are mildly eutrophic and lacking in nutrients. However, unlike other species in its genus, which are heavily tied to nutrient-poor habitats, the lilypad whiteface is more tolerant of other habitats. It is mostly found in aquatic environments in forests, including ponds, pools, lakes, peat excavations, and other water bodies with rich vegetation such as Nymphaea and Nuphar water-lilies. It can sometimes be found in environments with almost no vegetation. At the edges of its range in south-central Europe, it is found in oxbow lakes, quarries, and fishponds. Most water bodies inhabited by the lilypad whiteface have high concentrations of fish, as the larvae of the species have large spines that allow them to survive such environments better than other dragonflies. Males are typically found clinging to floating vegetation such as water-lilies, but can also be found on jetties and boats. Females and tenerals prefer sunny locations protected by the wind and further from the breeding grounds. Males are often seen raising their tails.

== Ecology ==
Breeding takes place on floating vegetation such as water-lilies and pondweed. Females generally lay the eggs alone, but are occasionally guarded by males. Larval development takes up to three years in Scandinavia but generally takes one year in warmer regions. Adults of the species can be seen from mid-May to early August and are most common in June. The dragonfly's exuviae are left next to the water on vegetation.

== Conservation ==
The lilypad whiteface is listed as being of least concern on the IUCN Red List due to its large range and large and increasing population. During the 20th century, the species suffered drastic declines in population throughout its range and was extirpated from several countries. This was likely due to habitat destruction caused by pollution, eutrophication, and water management. The lilypad whiteface was locally extinct in Wallonia, Czechia, Denmark, Serbia, and the Netherlands. However, it has since recovered and is increasing in population in most of its range, recolonising regions it was extirpated from while becoming more common in areas where it remained. It has returned to Belgium, Denmark, and the Netherlands and spread to Bosnia and Herzegovina. The reasons for the species' resurgence are unclear, but are likely linked to better water quality across its range and dragonfly's tolerance of a wider range of habitats than other species in its genus.

The lilypad whiteface is listed in Annex IV of the Habitats Directive and Annex II of the Bern Convention. Recommended conservation measures for the species include better monitoring of its distribution and population across its range to prevent any future declines in population, as well as monitoring the still-falling populations in Lithuania and Slovenia, alongside newly-established populations in the Balkans.
