= List of Odonata species of Great Britain =

There are 57 recorded species of Odonata in Britain, made up of 21 damselflies (suborder Zygoptera) and 36 dragonflies (suborder Anisoptera). Of these, 42 species (17 damselflies and 25 dragonflies) are resident breeders, and the remainder are either regionally extinct species, or vagrants - in respect of the latter, this list follows the decisions of the Odonata Records Committee.

Some of these rare species have not been seen since the 19th Century; however, the British Odonata list is also currently undergoing a period of unprecedented change, as new species are being discovered for the first time, some going on to become breeding species.

This list is based on the following principal references:

- Merritt, R., N. W. Moore and B. C. Eversham (1996), Atlas of the dragonflies of Britain and Ireland, HMSO (ISBN 0-11-701561-X)
- Parr, A. J. (1996), Dragonfly movement and migration in Britain and Ireland, Journal of the British Dragonfly Society Vol. 12 No. 2 pp. 33–50
- Parr, Adrian (2000a), An Annotated List of the Odonata of Britain and Ireland, Atropos No. 11 pp. 10–20
- British Dragonfly Society website (for the most recent distribution updates)

A number of other references were used to provide information on specific topics, including rare vagrants, post-1990 additions, predictions, species claimed but not accepted/species of uncertain provenance, non-natives, taxonomic matters and species found only in the Channel Islands.

Ireland's Odonata fauna is quite different from that of Britain, with many fewer breeding species, but one additional species not found in Britain, Irish Damselfly Coenagrion lunulatum – see List of Odonata species of Ireland for more information.

== New species since 1990 ==
After a period in which the British Odonata list had been relatively static, many new species have been found since 1990 and some have gone on to become regular breeding species. In chronological order of their first record, these new species are:

- Scarlet dragonfly, first recorded at Hayle Kimbro Pool, The Lizard, Cornwall on 7 August 1995 (Jones 1996), with a small number of further records at scattered locations throughout Britain
- Banded darter (Sympetrum pedemontanum), recorded just once to date, near Tredegar, Monmouthshire on 16 August 1995, although a darter seen on 29 July 2003 at Hickling Broad, Norfolk, which had dark bands on its wings, may have been this species
- Lesser emperor, first recorded at Cinderford, in the Forest of Dean, Gloucestershire on 13 June 1996 (Phillips 1997a, 1997b) and now occurring annually; breeding evidence was found at Hayle Kimbro Pool (Jones 2000) and also at Bake Fishing Lakes, Cornwall (Pellow 2000) in 1999, and the species appears to be resident at Dungeness, Kent
- Green darner, first recorded at Penlee Battery, Cornwall on 9 September 1998; the first record for Europe of this North American species (Pellow 1999a, 1999b), with several other records in South West England that autumn, but none since to date
- Small red-eyed damselfly, first recorded in Essex on 17 July 1999; (Dewick and Gerussi 2000) now a well-established breeding species across most of England
- Southern emerald damselfly, first recorded at Winterton Dunes, Norfolk on 30 July 2002 (Nobes 2003); in 2003 & 2004, the species was again seen here and at Sandwich Bay, Kent (Forrest 2005), but there have been no subsequent sightings at either location.
- Common winter damselfly, first recorded at Tonna, Neath in South Wales in December 2008.
- Yellow-spotted emerald, first (and only) record at Carlton Marshes, Suffolk, in July 2018.

Many British Odonata enthusiasts expect further species to be added to the list in the near future. The list below is up to date as of the end of the 2005 breeding season.

== Extinct species and casual breeders ==
While most species on the list below are either extant established breeding species or rare vagrants, some do not fall into these two categories. The following species bred in the past but are now extinct in Britain:

- Dainty damselfly – only ever known from marshes along the Thames Estuary in Essex, first recorded in 1946, and last recorded in 1952. Rediscovered 2010.
- Norfolk damselfly – only ever known from the Norfolk Broads between 1902 and 1957
- Orange-spotted emerald – only ever known from two areas in southern England, one around the River Stour and Moors River in east Dorset, where the species was recorded from 1820 to 1963, and the other on the River Tamar in Devon where the species was recorded in 1946 only.

The following species are sporadic or casual breeders:

- Yellow-winged darter – this species has a pattern of establishing small breeding colonies following influxes, but none of these have become permanently established
- Red-veined darter – following influxes in previous years, this species, like the yellow-winged darter, has formed temporary breeding colonies. However, since the mid-1990s, the number of these colonies has increased and many have continued to be present from year-to-year, so this species is now better regarded as a successful colonist.

== Non-native introductions ==
Records of non-native Odonata species in Britain have been confined to individuals found within heated greenhouses associated with nurseries for aquatic plants. None of these species have been recorded in wild situations or gone on to establish populations in the wild. Details of species which have occurred in such circumstances can be found in Agassiz 1981, Brooks 1988, and Parr 2000a.

== The list ==
The list is in taxonomic order. The English name of each species is given, followed by its scientific name, details of the range countries for each breeding species, and an overall status code for species which are not long-established extant breeding species.

The following abbreviations are used to give country-by-country distribution information for the breeding species:

- Eng to indicate that the species' breeding range includes England
- Scot to indicate that the species' breeding range includes Scotland
- Wales to indicate that the species' breeding range includes Wales

The following codes are used to give status details for those species which are not long-established extant breeding species:

- Ex to indicate a former breeding species, now extinct in Britain (with the year of the last record in brackets)
- RC to indicate that the species is a recent (i.e. post-1990) colonist (with the year of the first British record in brackets, except for Red-veined Darter which has occurred as a migrant and sporadic breeder for many decades)
- V to indicate a species only recorded as a vagrant (with the year of the first record in brackets, except for species with long histories as visitors to Britain)

=== Suborder Zygoptera (damselflies) ===
==== Family Calopterygidae (demoiselles) ====
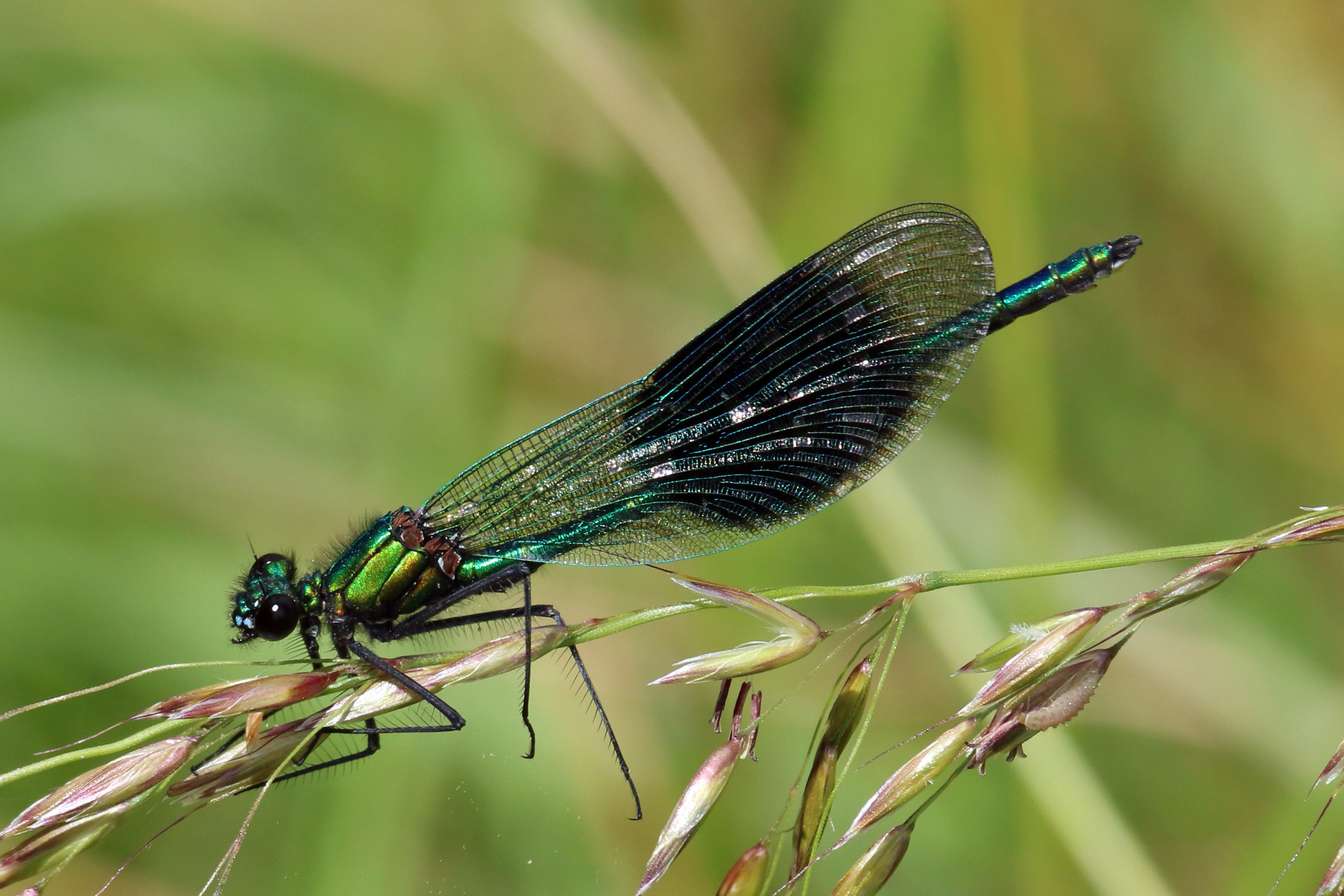
Banded demoiselle

Species	Scientific name	Range countries	Status code
Banded demoiselle	Calopteryx splendens	Eng/Scot/Wales	
Beautiful demoiselle	Calopteryx virgo	Eng/Scot/Wales	

==== Family Lestidae (emerald damselflies) ====
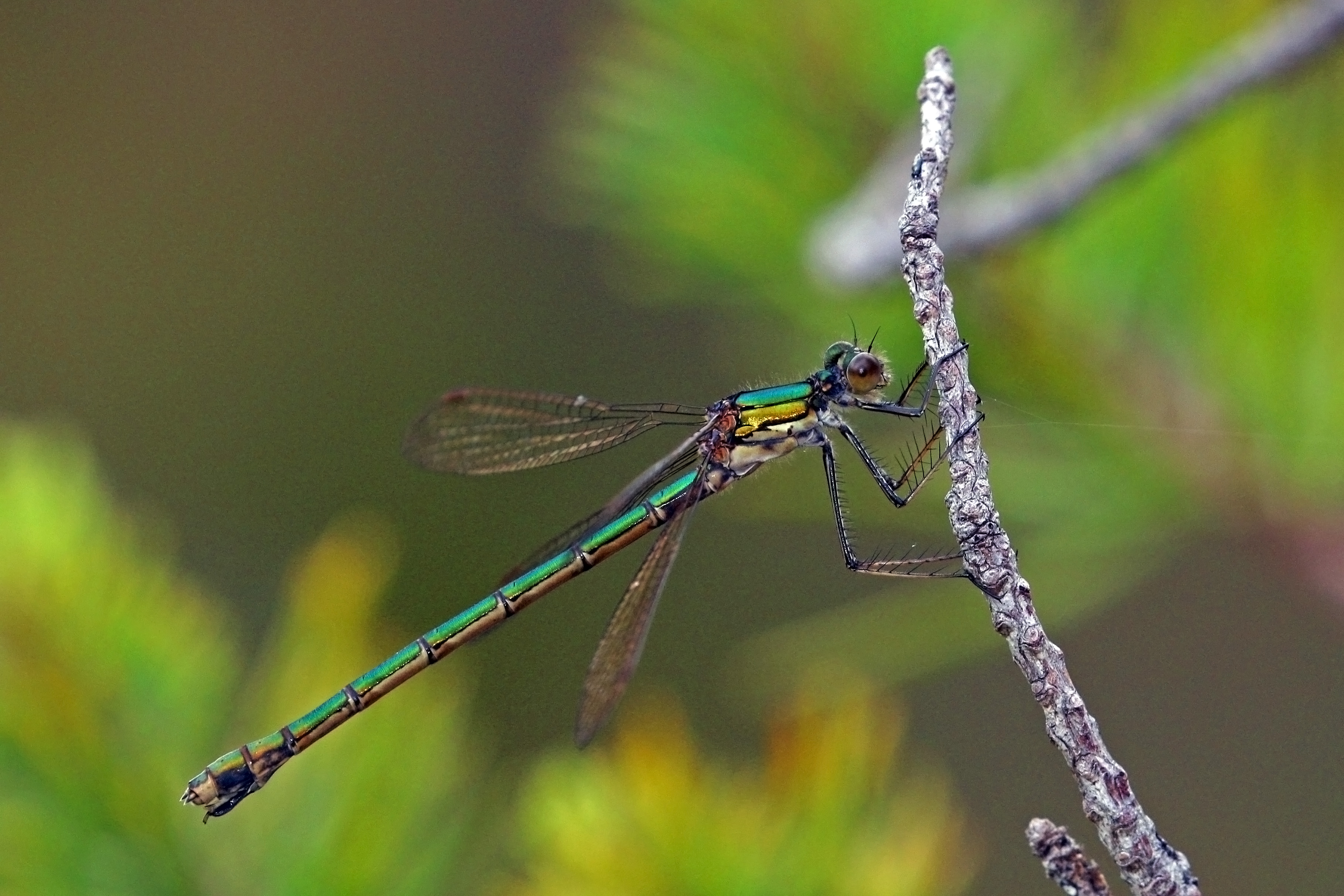
Emerald damselfly, female

Species	Scientific name	Range countries	Status code
Willow emerald damselfly^{[A]}	Chalcolestes viridis		V (1899) RC (2007)
Scarce emerald damselfly	Lestes dryas	Eng	
Emerald damselfly	Lestes sponsa	Eng/Scot/Wales	
Southern emerald damselfly	Lestes barbarus	Eng	V (2002)
Common winter damselfly	Sympecma fusca		V (2008)

==== Family Coenagrionidae (blue, blue-tailed, and red damselflies) ====
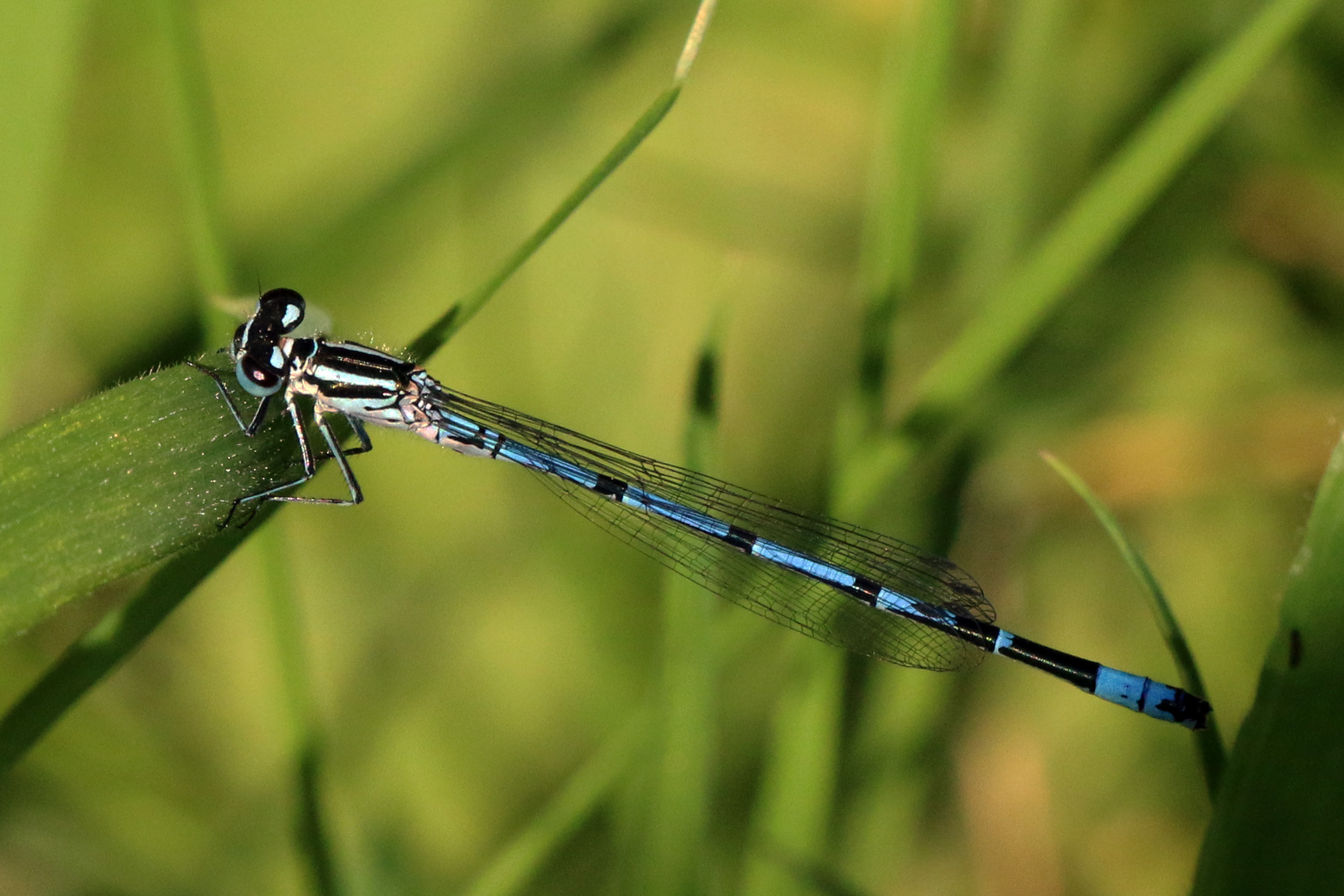
Azure damselfly male

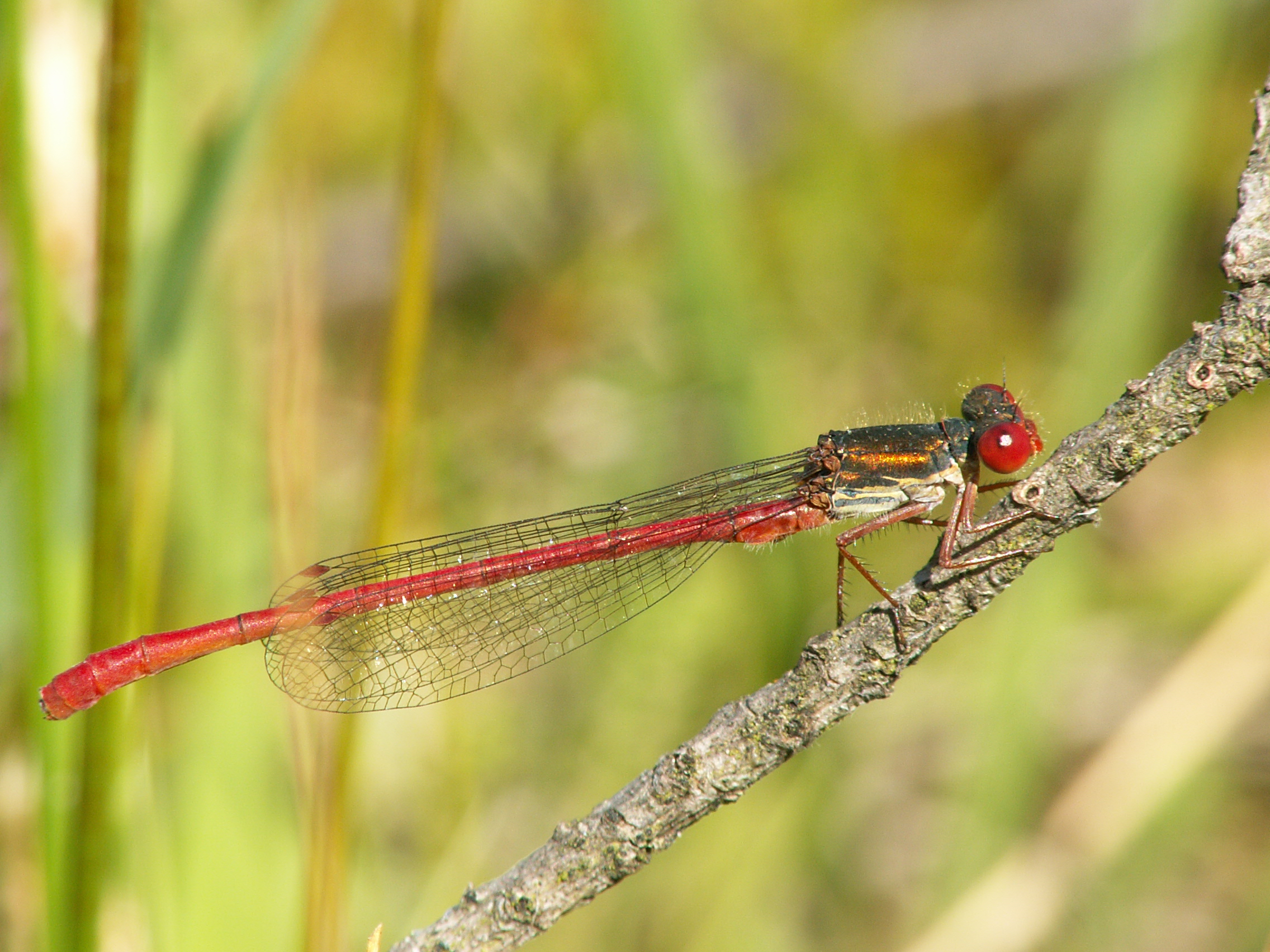
Small red damselfly

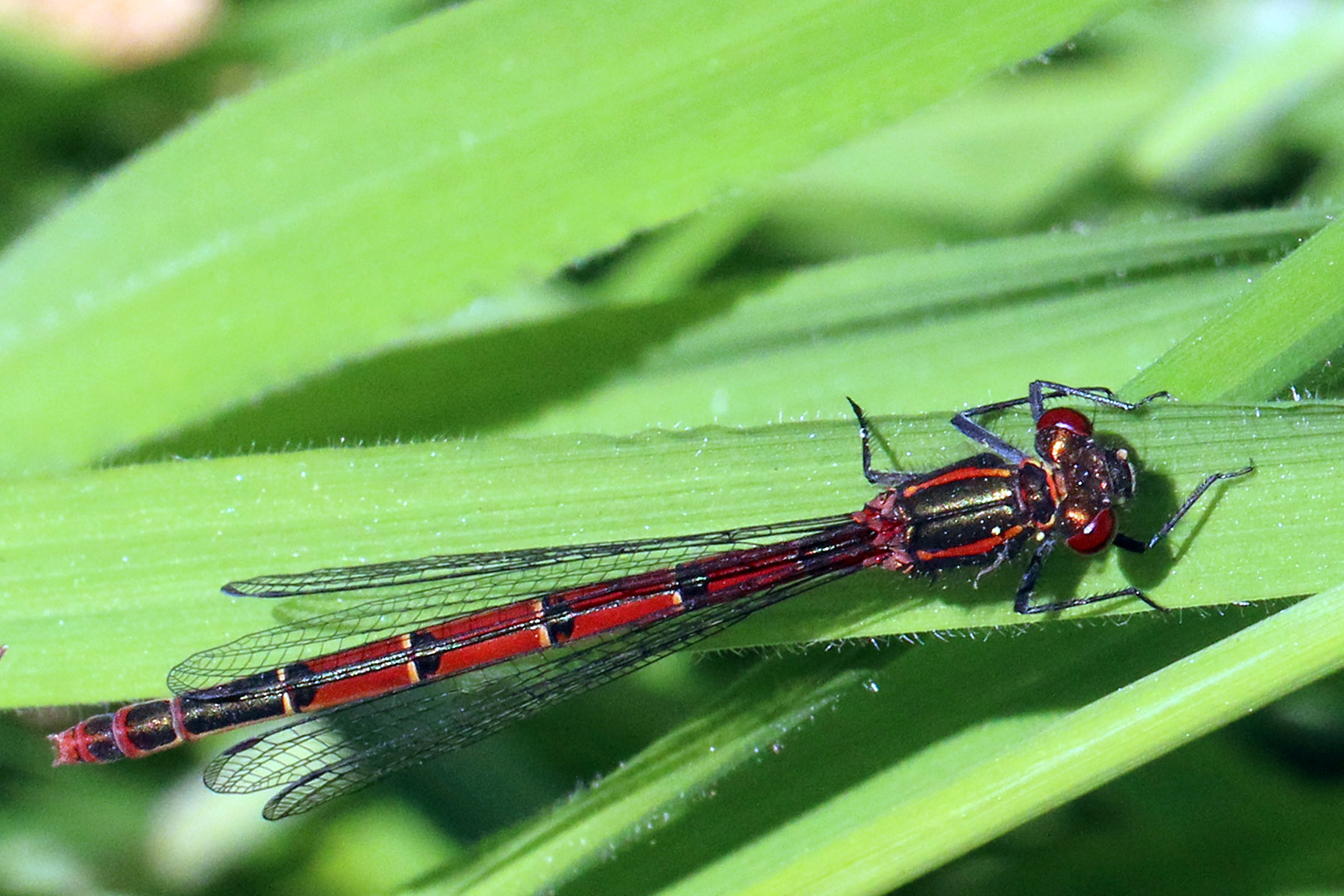
Large red damselfly male

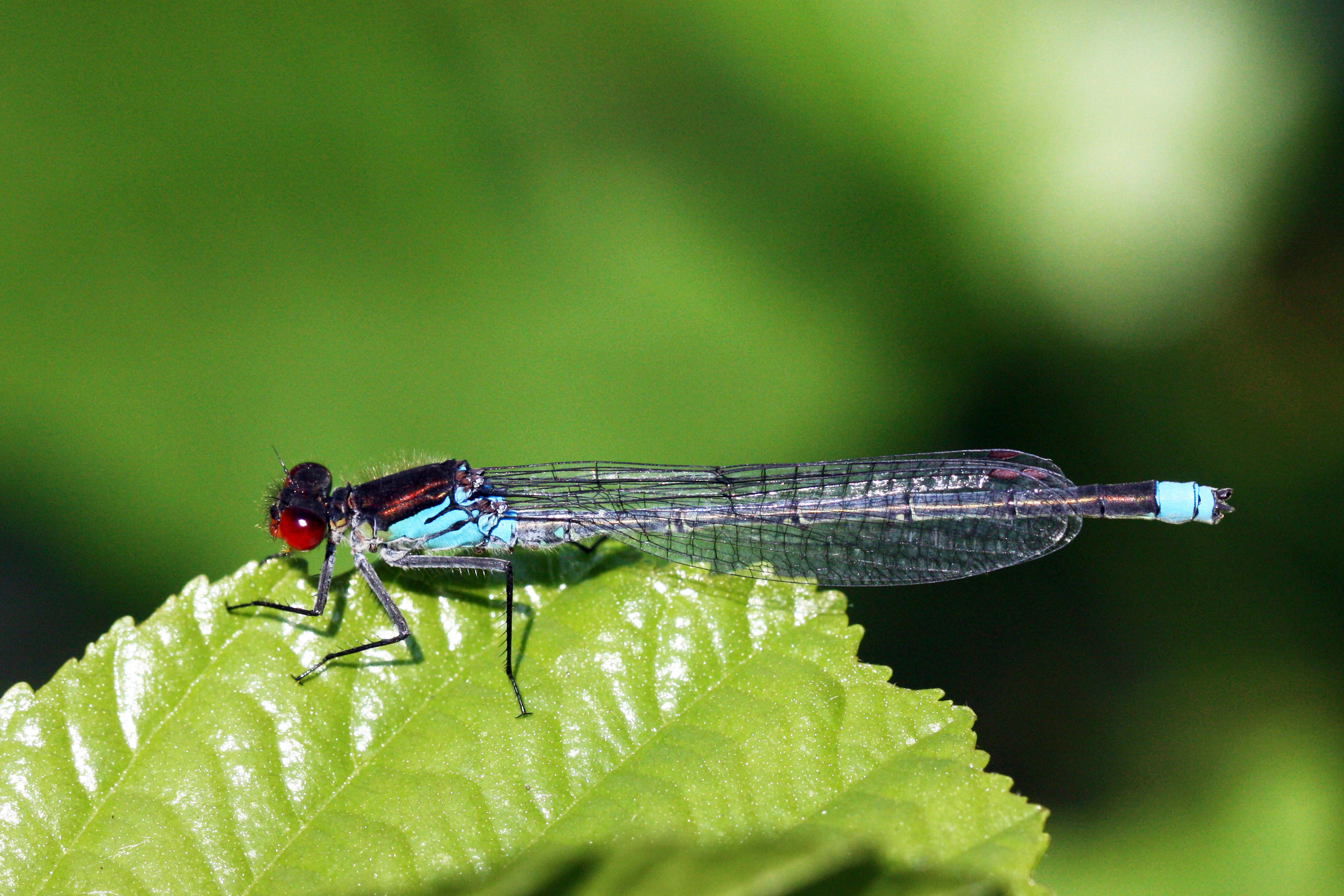
Red-eyed damselfly male

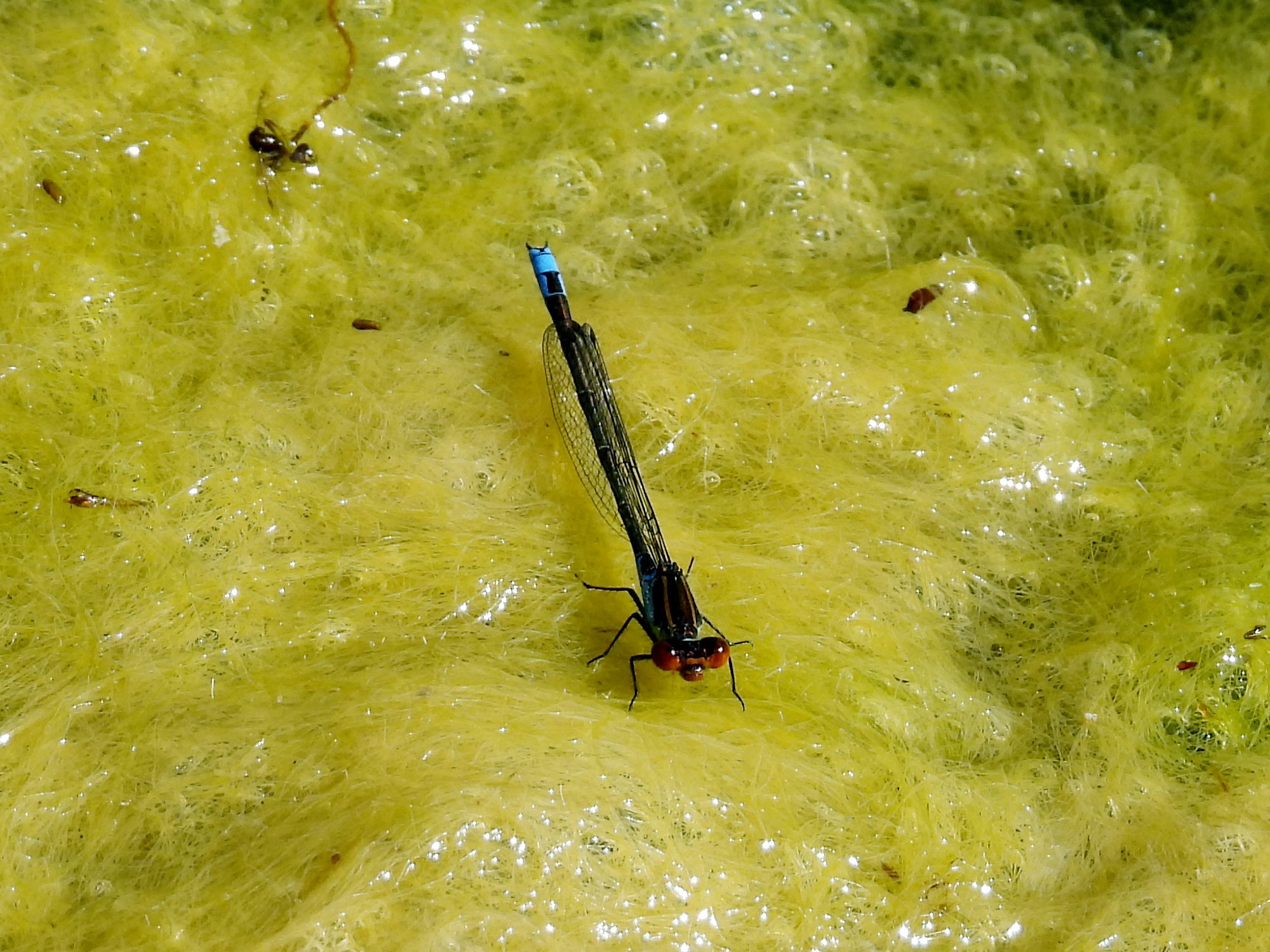
Small red-eyed damselfly male, at its current northern limit in southern Northumberland

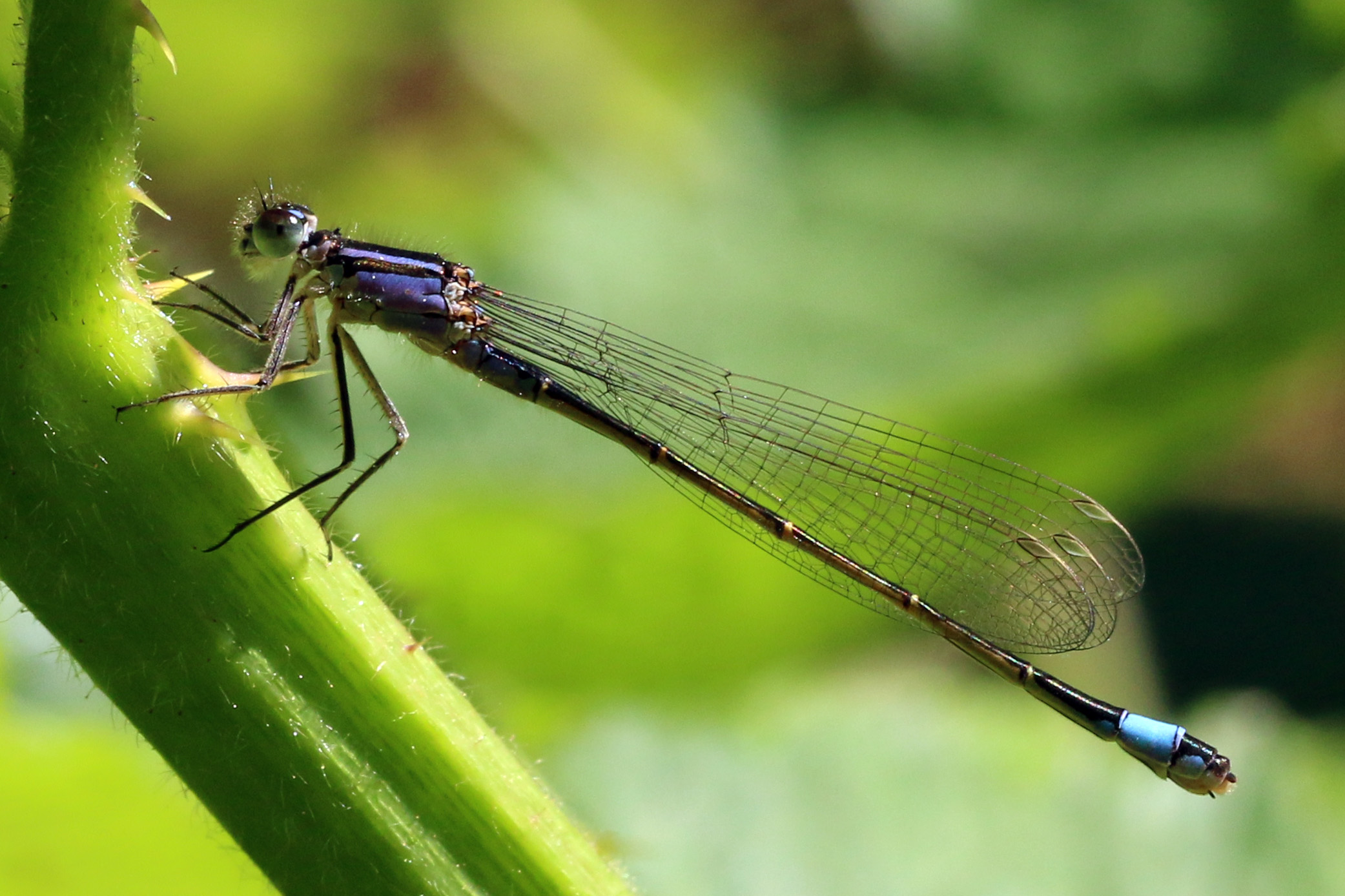
Blue-tailed damselfly female

Species	Scientific name	Range countries	Status code
Small red damselfly	Ceriagrion tenellum	Eng/Wales	
Norfolk damselfly	Coenagrion armatum		Ex (1957)
Northern damselfly	Coenagrion hastulatum	Scot	
Southern damselfly	Coenagrion mercuriale	Eng/Wales	
Azure damselfly	Coenagrion puella	Eng/Scot/Wales	
Variable damselfly	Coenagrion pulchellum	Eng/Scot/Wales	
Dainty damselfly	Coenagrion scitulum	Eng	RC (2010)
Common blue damselfly	Enallagma cyathigerum	Eng/Scot/Wales	
Red-eyed damselfly	Erythromma najas	Eng/Wales	
Small red-eyed damselfly	Erythromma viridulum	Eng/Wales	RC (1999)
Blue-tailed damselfly	Ischnura elegans	Eng/Scot/Wales	
Scarce blue-tailed damselfly	Ischnura pumilio	Eng/Wales	
Large red damselfly	Pyrrhosoma nymphula	Eng/Scot/Wales	

==== Family Platycnemididae (white-legged damselflies) ====
Species	Scientific name	Range countries	Status code
White-legged damselfly	Platycnemis pennipes	Eng/Wales	

=== Suborder Anisoptera (dragonflies) ===
==== Family Gomphidae (club-tailed dragonflies) ====
Species	Scientific name	Range countries	Status Code
Common clubtail^{[B]}	Gomphus vulgatissimus	Eng/Wales	
Yellow-legged dragonfly^{[C]}	Gomphus flavipes		V (1818)

==== Family Aeshnidae (hawkers and emperors) ====
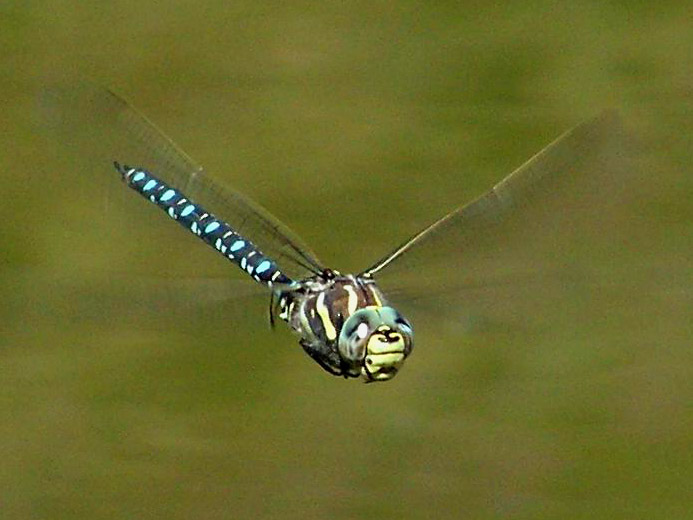
Common hawker

Species	Scientific name	Range countries	Status code
Southern hawker	Aeshna cyanea	Eng/Scot/Wales	
Brown hawker	Aeshna grandis	Eng/Wales (Scot, V)	
Norfolk hawker	Aeshna isosceles	Eng^{[K]}	
Azure hawker	Aeshna caerulea	Scot	
Common hawker	Aeshna juncea	Eng/Scot/Wales	
Migrant hawker	Aeshna mixta	Eng/Scot/Wales	
Southern migrant hawker^{[D]}	Aeshna affinis		V (1952) ?RC (2012)
Emperor	Anax imperator	Eng/Scot/Wales	
Lesser emperor	Anax parthenope	Eng (Scot/Wales, V)	RC (1996)
Green darner	Anax junius		V (1998)
Hairy dragonfly	Brachytron pratense	Eng/Scot/Wales	
Vagrant emperor^{[E]}	Hemianax ephippiger		V (1903)

==== Family Cordulegastridae (golden-ringed dragonflies) ====
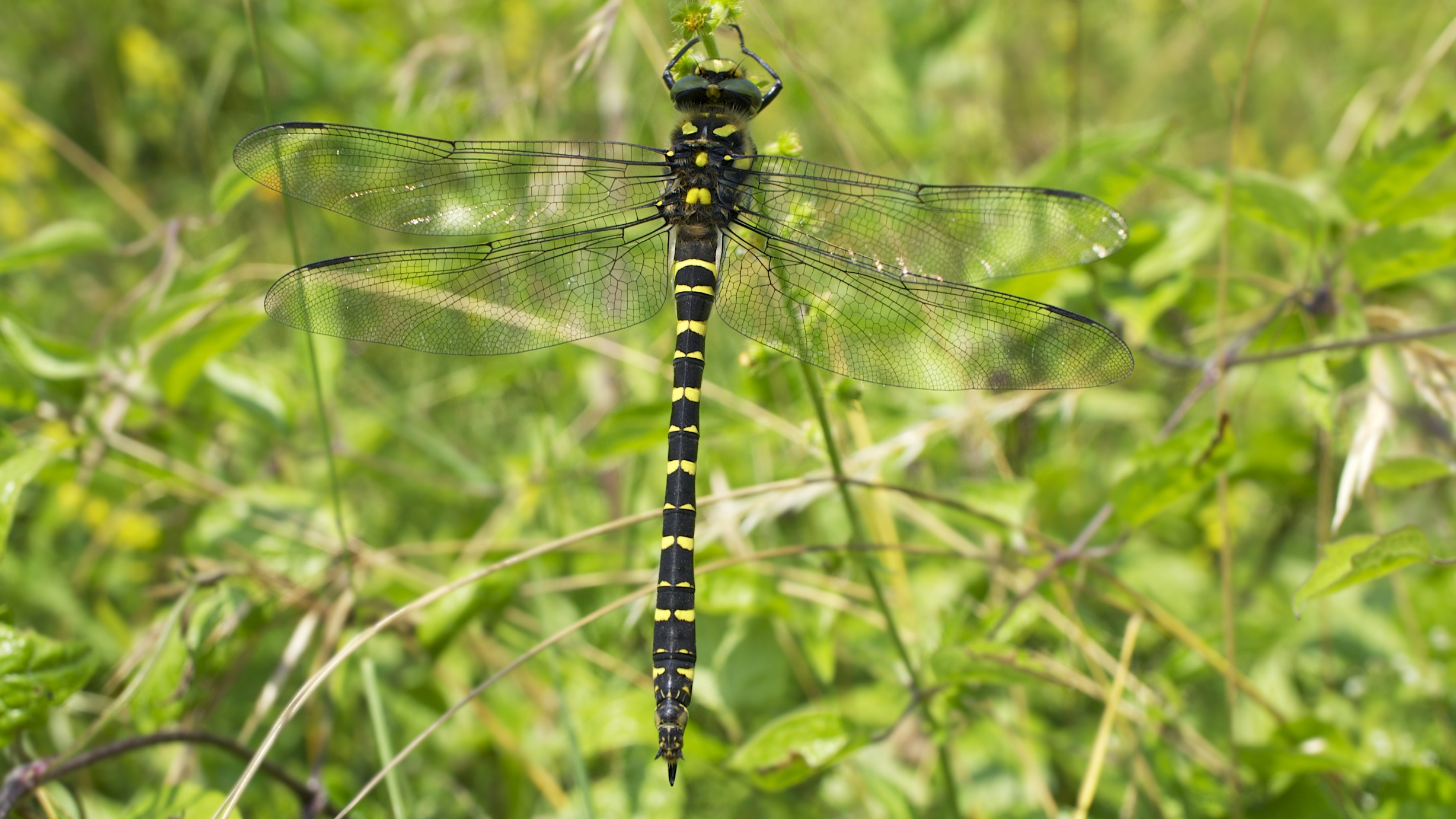
Golden-ringed dragonfly

Species	Scientific name	Range countries	Status code
Golden-ringed dragonfly	Cordulegaster boltonii	Eng/Scot/Wales	

==== Family Corduliidae (emerald dragonflies) ====
Species	Scientific name	Range countries	Status code
Downy emerald	Cordulia aenea	Eng/Scot/Wales	
Brilliant emerald	Somatochlora metallica	Eng/Scot	
Yellow-spotted emerald	Somatochlora flavomaculata		V (2018)
Northern emerald	Somatochlora arctica	Scot	
Orange-spotted emerald	Oxygastra curtisii		Ex (1963)

==== Family Libellulidae (chasers, skimmers, and darters) ====
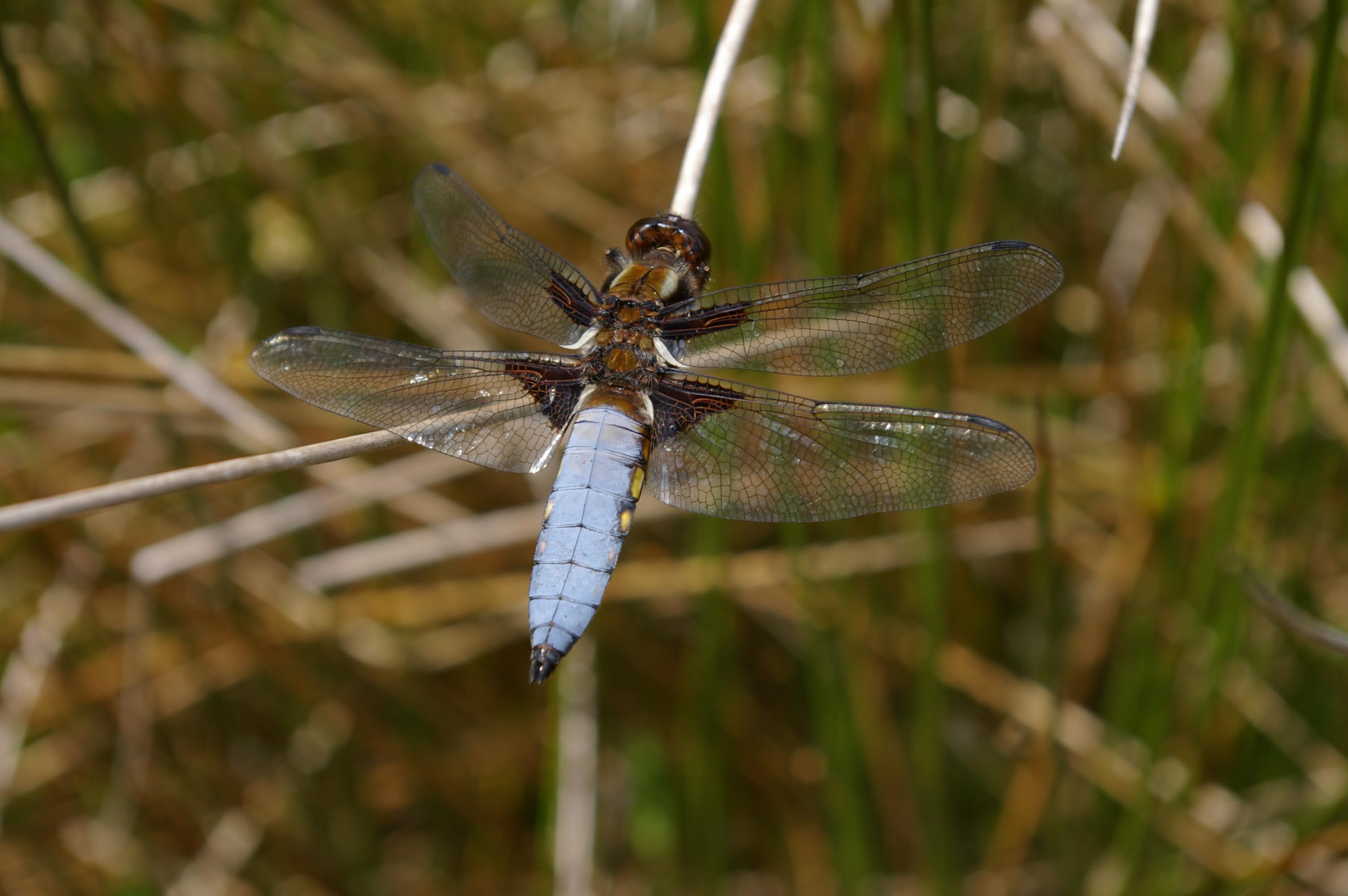
Broad-bodied chaser

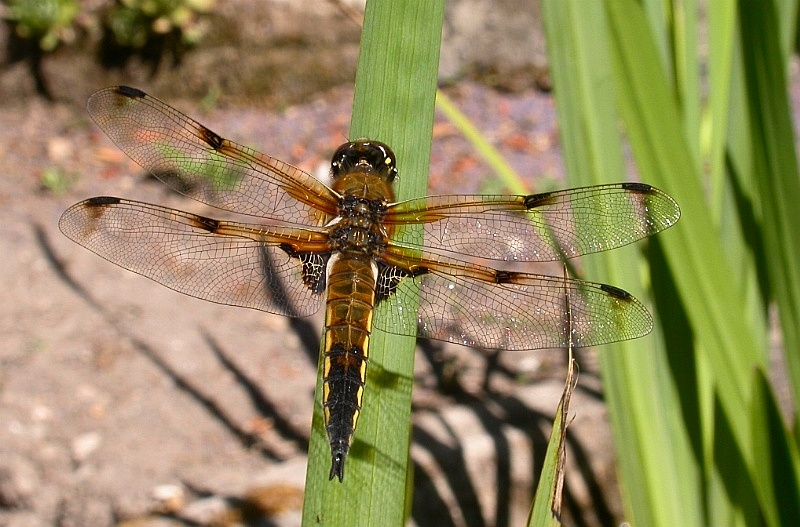
Four-spotted chaser

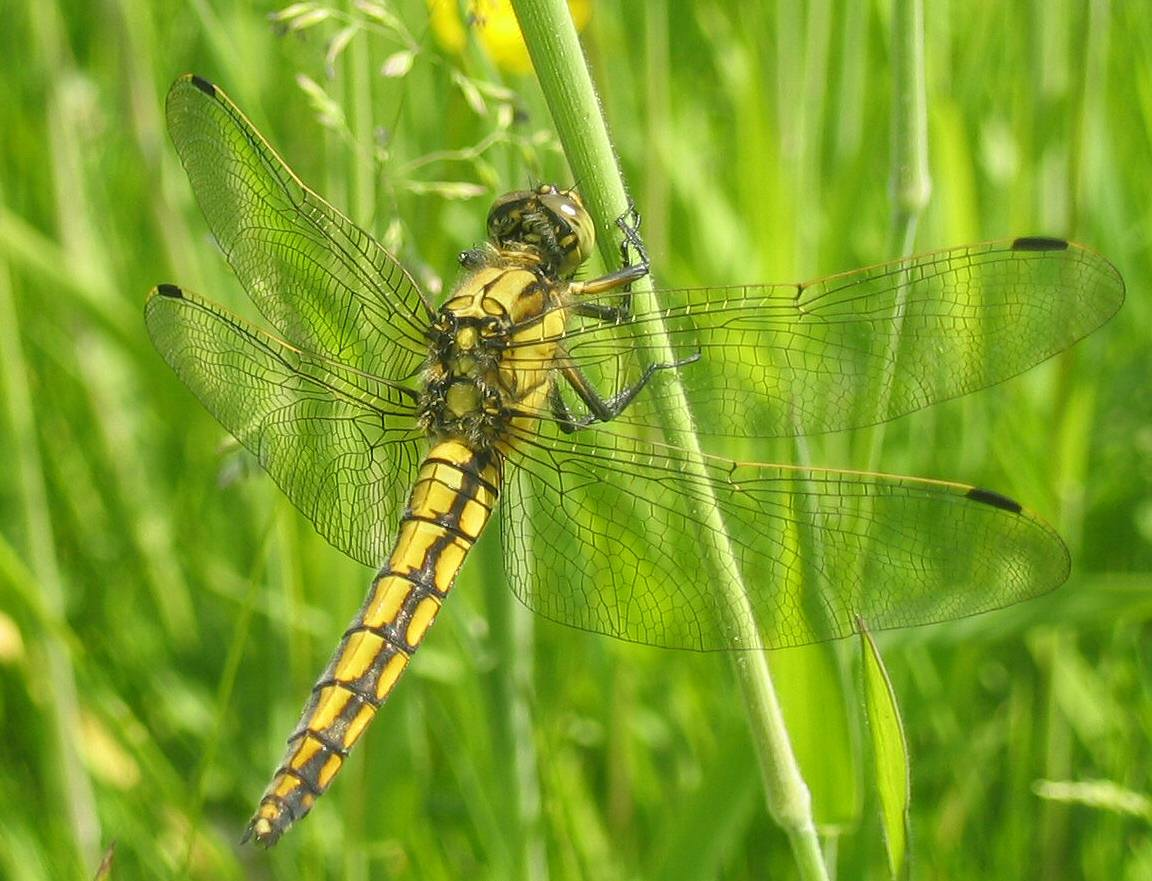
Black-tailed skimmer

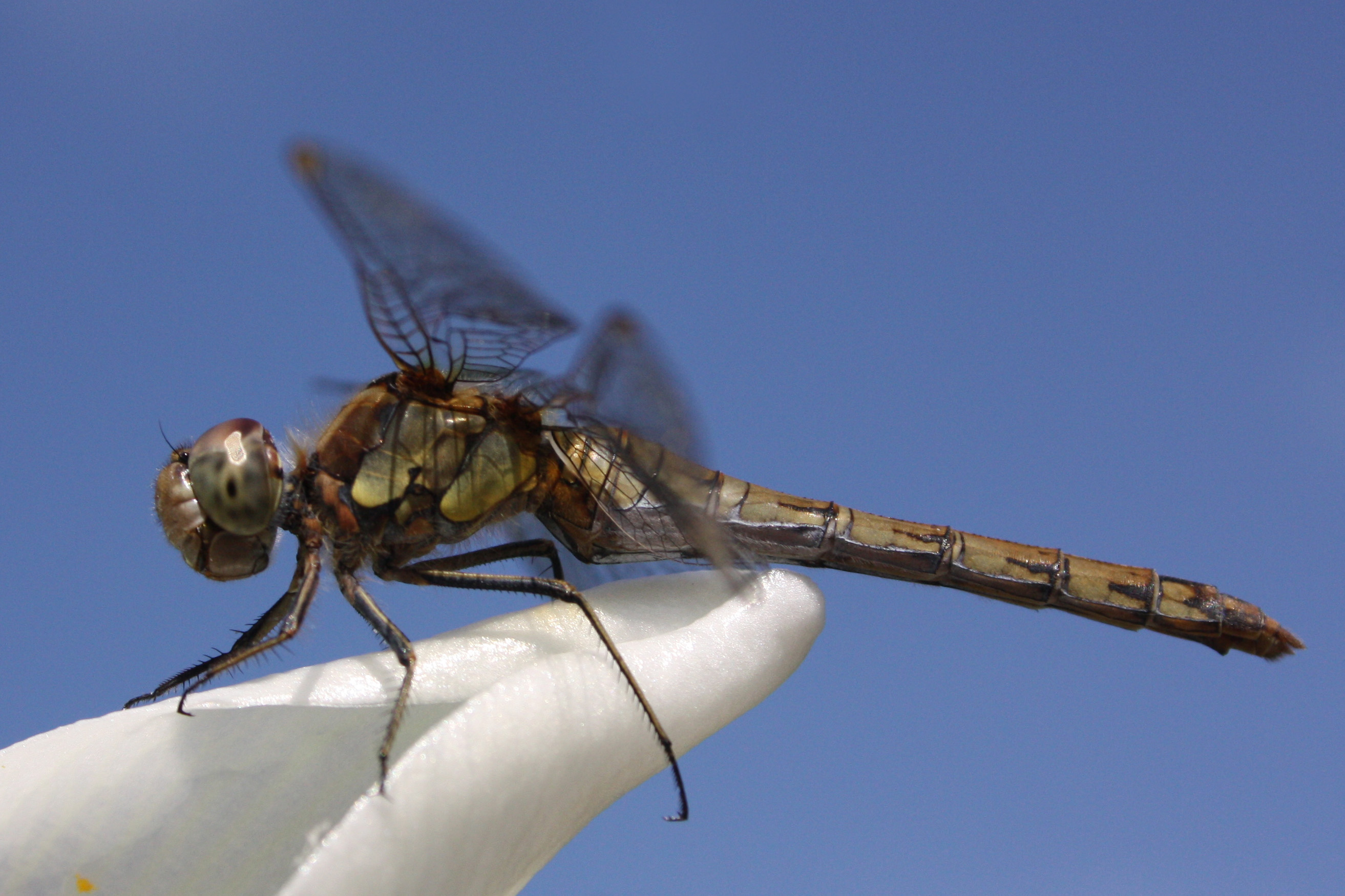
Common darter

Species	Scientific name	Range countries	Status code
Broad-bodied chaser	Libellula depressa	Eng/Scot/Wales	
Scarce chaser	Libellula fulva	Eng/Wales	
Four-spotted chaser	Libellula quadrimaculata	Eng/Scot/Wales	
Black-tailed skimmer	Orthetrum cancellatum	Eng/Scot/Wales	
Keeled skimmer	Orthetrum coerulescens	Eng/Scot/Wales	
Scarlet dragonfly	Crocothemis erythraea		V (1995)
Black darter	Sympetrum danae	Eng/Scot/Wales	
Yellow-winged darter^{[F]}	Sympetrum flaveolum		V
Red-veined darter	Sympetrum fonscolombei	Eng/Wales (Scot, V)	RC
Ruddy darter	Sympetrum sanguineum	Eng/Wales (Scot, V)	
Common darter^{[G]}	Sympetrum striolatum	Eng/Scot/Wales	
Highland darter^{[G]}	Sympetrum striolatum nigrescens	Scot	
Vagrant darter	Sympetrum vulgatum		V
Banded darter	Sympetrum pedemontanum		V (1995)
White-faced darter	Leucorrhinia dubia	Eng/Scot/Wales	
Large white-faced darter^{[H]}	Leucorrhinia pectoralis		V (1859)
Wandering glider^{[I]}^{[J]}	Pantala flavescens		V (1823)

=== Notes ===
^{A} Willow emerald damselfly, since 2007 this species is established and spreading in south-east England, especially Suffolk and Essex. It was previously only known from a single record from Hertfordshire in 1899 (although this record is based on a specimen regarded by some as perhaps not of British origin, see Gladwin 1997) and a single exuvia collected in Kent in 1992 (Brook & Brook 2002, 2004).
^{B} Common clubtail was formerly known as club-tailed dragonfly.
^{C} Yellow-legged dragonfly is known from just a single record, in Sussex in 1818.
^{D} Southern migrant hawker was known from just a single record, in Kent in 1952, although an Aeshna seen in 1992 on the outskirts of Bristol may have been this species (Holmes 1993), and the species has been recorded twice in Jersey since 1998 (Long 2000, Parr 2005). However in 2006 four specimens were seen: In the Adur valley in West Sussex on 13 July website of reporter with photo Archived 2 March 2007 at the Wayback Machine; Grimstone Warren, Norfolk on 21 July; Little Wootton Inclosure New Forest (SZ 227 987) on 6 August; And at the mouth of the Beaulieu River in Hampshire on 10 August. Since 2012 it has probably become established as a breeding species in the Thames Estuary area.
^{E} Vagrant emperor records taken from Silsby (1993).
^{F} Yellow-winged darter is listed as a vagrant, but is occasionally subject to large influxes e.g. in 1995.
^{G} Highland darter and common darter may be conspecific (see Merritt & Vick 1983).
^{H} Large white-faced darter has been recorded only once, at Sheerness, Kent in 1859.
^{I} Wandering glider has been recorded only three times – at Horning, Norfolk in 1823, Bolton, Lancashire in 1951 and in Kent in 1989, although the two 20th Century records may result from accidental introductions.
^{J} Wandering glider was formerly known as globe skimmer.
^{K} Habitat limited to Eastern England and particularly East Anglia.

== Rejected species, species of uncertain provenance, predictions and Channel Islands species ==
1. The following species have been claimed but not accepted by the Odonata Records Committee:

- Two-spotted dragonfly (Epitheca bimaculata) was reported from Leicestershire in 2002 – see Parr (2003).

2. The following species have been recorded, and their identification accepted, but the circumstances surrounding the records and/or specimens cast doubt on their natural occurrence, and they are not included in the official British list:

- Blue dasher (Pachydiplax longipennis), which was found dead on the Sedco 706 oil rig in the North Sea off the Shetland Isles in early September 1999 (Parr 2000b). It was not accepted as the species is not a strong migrant and the rig receives weekly supplies from Texas.

- Southern darter (Sympetrum meridionale), only known from old specimens with vague data (but recorded from the Channel Islands).

- Alpine emerald (Somatochlora alpestris), only known from a single specimen labelled as having been collected by K. J. Morton in Inverness in 1926; however Morton was travelling in continental Europe on the date in question.

3. The following is a list of species which have previously been predicted to occur in Britain but have not yet been recorded (see Merritt, Moore & Eversham 1996 pp. 113–114 and Parr 1998, 1999): subarctic darner (Aeshna subarctica), northern white-faced darter (Leucorrhina rubicunda) and small emerald damselfly (Lestes virens).

4. In addition to the species listed above, southern skimmer (Orthetrum brunneum) and southern darter (Sympetrum meridionale) have been recorded in the Channel Islands (Parr 2000a).
