= Yellow-spotted emerald =

Yellow-spotted emerald may refer to:

- Somatochlora flavomaculata, a species of dragonfly in the family Corduliidae, common in northern Europe from France through to Siberia and Mongolia
- Hemicordulia intermedia, a species of dragonfly in the family Corduliidae, found across northern Australia
