= Atropos (disambiguation) =

Atropos is one of the three goddesses of fate and destiny in Greek mythology.

Atropos may refer also to:

- Atropos (Goya), an 1819-23 painting by Francisco de Goya
- Atropos (journal), a British entomology journal
- A taxonomic synonym for Atropoides, a.k.a. jumping pitvipers, a genus of venomous snakes found in Mexico and Central America
- A taxonomic synonym for Trimeresurus, a.k.a. Asian pit vipers, a genus of venomous snakes found in Asia
- 273 Atropos, an asteroid
- A fictional planet in the 2021 video game Returnal
- HMS Atropos, a fictional ship commanded by Horatio Hornblower
- In chemistry, as a shorthand for atropisomer, which is a stereoisomer resulting from hindered rotation about a single bond
- A fictional planet in the 1993 Star Trek: Next Generation novel The Devil's Heart
