= Banded darter =

Banded darter may refer to:

- Banded darter (dragonfly) (Sympetrum pedemontanum), a European species of dragonfly of the family Libellulidae
- Banded darter (fish) (Etheostoma zonale), a small freshwater fish in the family Percidae found it the eastern United States
