= Ruary Mackenzie Dodds =

Ruary Mackenzie Dodds is a British author, naturalist, and dragonfly conservationist. He is recognised for his contributions to dragonfly conservation, his nonfiction works on Odonata, and his historical novels. He established Europe’s first public dragonfly sanctuary.

== Career ==
Mackenzie Dodds has led and developed projects in dragonfly conservation since the 1980s and 1990s, including the establishment of a public dragonfly centre and sanctuary. He has undertaken field expeditions to New Zealand, where "Our Changing World" (RNZ) profiled him as a specialist in dragonfly ecology and water-quality indicators.

He is active in public outreach and education, appearing in BBC-related programmes and giving talks. Publisher and event listings describe him as “renowned naturalist” and attribute to him the praise of TV naturalist Chris Packham.

== Works ==
Mackenzie Dodds has published both nonfiction and fiction, including:

- The Dragonfly Diaries: The Unlikely Story of Europe’s First Dragonfly Sanctuary (2014), a memoir-style account of his work in conservation.
- Dragonfly-Friendly Gardening (2019), a guide to attracting dragonflies and damselflies to gardens.
- Aberfeldy: The History of a Highland Community (1986), a history of the Aberfeldy valley in Scotland.

== Reception ==
In "Our Changing World" (RNZ) he is quoted explaining that dragonflies are indicators of clean water and describing their ecological and behavioural traits. His field work in New Zealand was featured in a profile by the British Dragonfly Society, highlighting his expedition to find the bush giant dragonfly. The "Dragonflies in the Garden" event listing at Exbury describes him as a “renowned naturalist and author … described by TV personality Chris Packham” promoting public awareness. "The Dragonfly Diaries" was reviewed by Mark Avery, who commented on the narrative of setting up the sanctuary and the presence of influential naturalists such as Miriam Rothschild in the book.
