= Odonata Records Committee =

The Odonata Records Committee is the recognised national body which verifies records of rare vagrant dragonflies in Britain.

It was set up in 1998 and consists of six members. Its chairman is Adrian Parr.

Decisions on records are published in Atropos and the Journal of the British Dragonfly Society.
