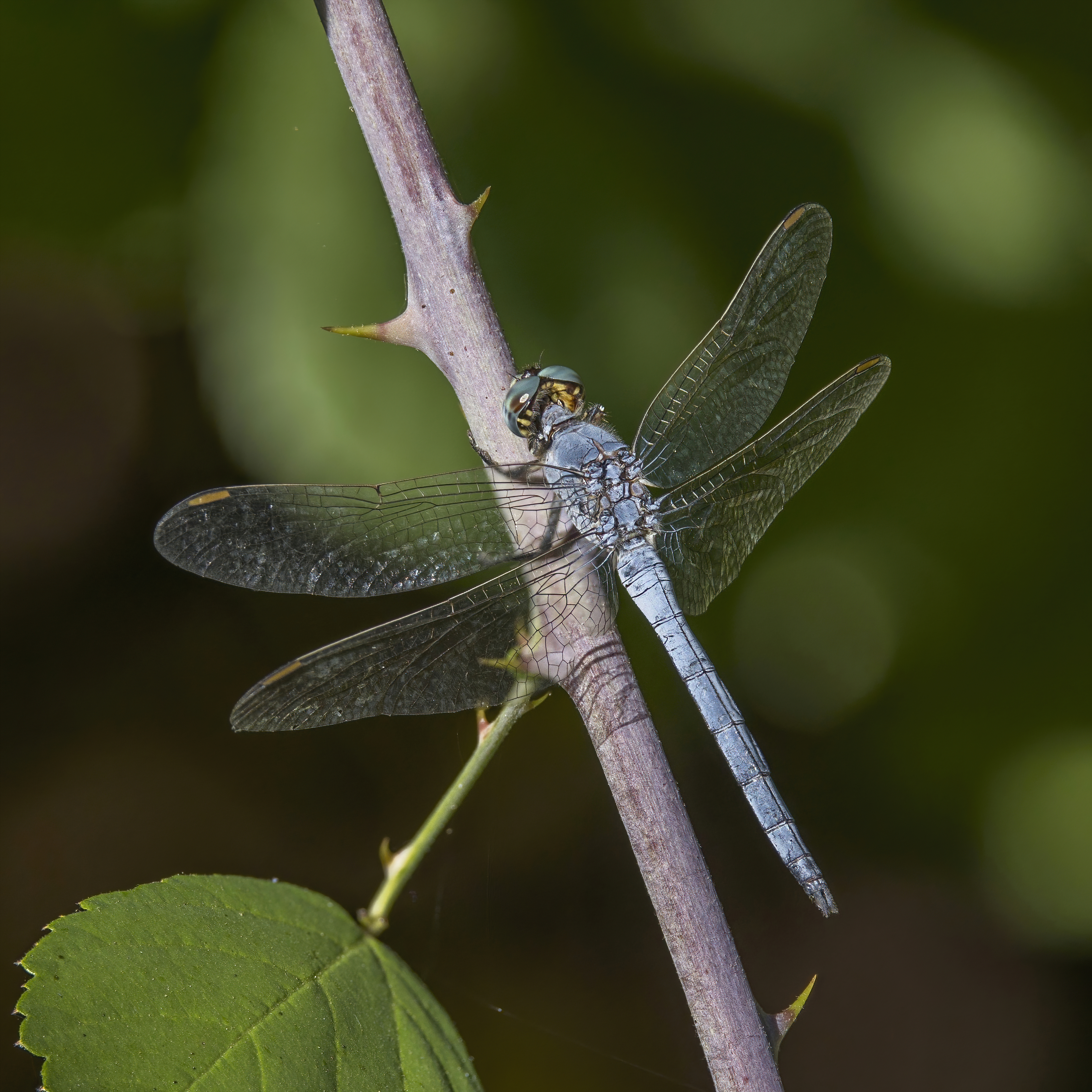
- Mature male, Cyprus
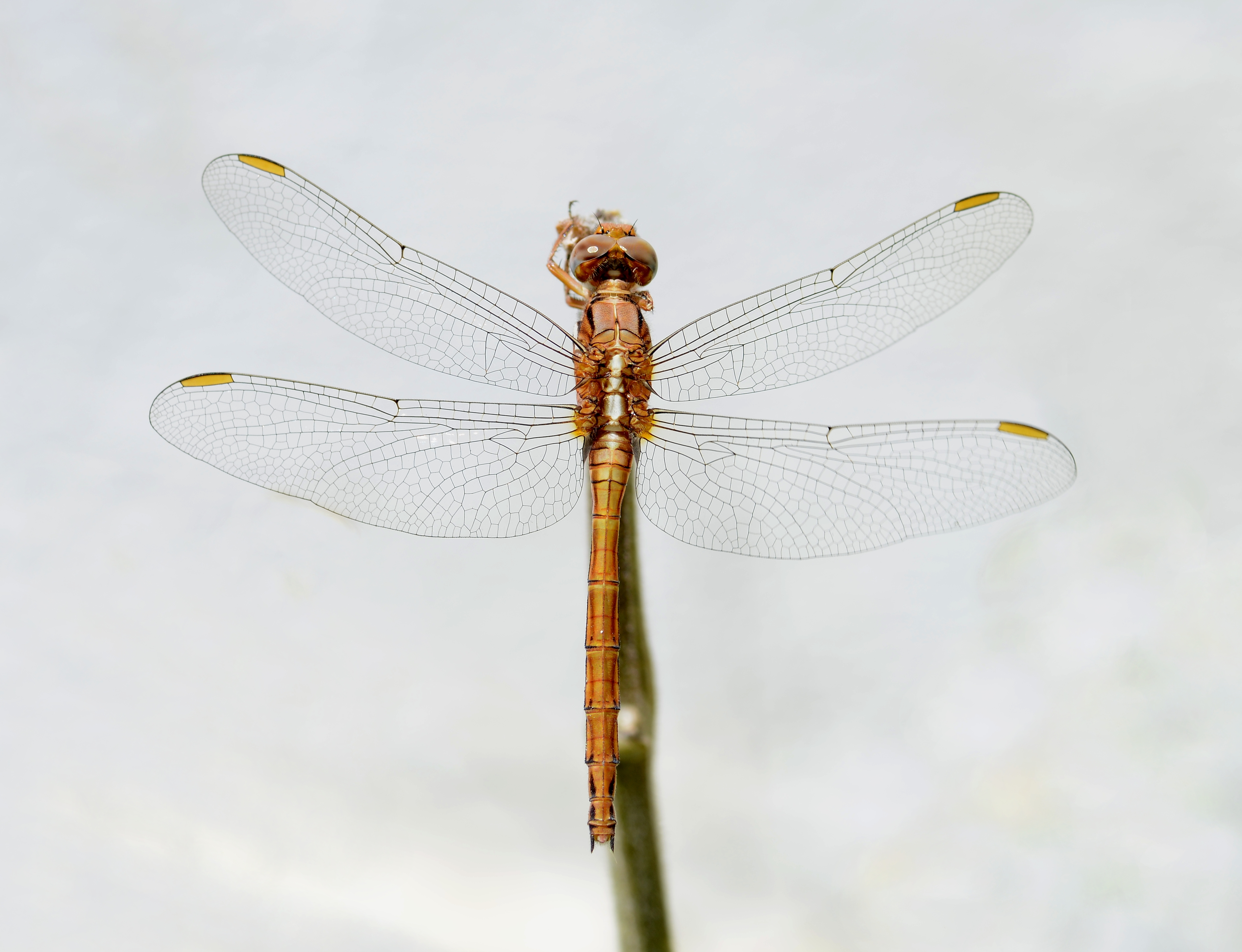
- Female, Porto Covo, Portugal

Conservation status
- Least Concern (IUCN 3.1)

Scientific classification
- Kingdom: Animalia
- Phylum: Arthropoda
- Clade: Pancrustacea
- Class: Insecta
- Order: Odonata
- Infraorder: Anisoptera
- Family: Libellulidae
- Genus: Orthetrum
- Species: O. coerulescens

Binomial name
- Orthetrum coerulescens (Fabricius, 1798)

Synonyms
- Libellula anceps Schneider, 1845; Libellula donovani Leach, 1815; Libellula dubia Rambur, 1842; Libellula olympia Fonscolombe, 1837; Libellula opalina Charpentier, 1825; Orthetrum helena Buchholtz, 1954; Orthetrum ramburii (Sélys, 1848)

= Keeled skimmer =

Species of dragonfly

The keeled skimmer (Orthetrum coerulescens) is a species of dragonfly belonging to the family Libellulidae.

== Distribution ==
The keeled skimmer is common in central and southern Europe, marginally entering into Russia, and in North Africa. It is locally common in western Britain and Ireland.

This species is present in Afghanistan; Albania; Algeria; Armenia; Austria; Azerbaijan; Bosnia and Herzegovina; Bulgaria; Croatia; Cyprus; Czech Republic; Denmark; Finland; France; Georgia; Greece; Hungary; Iran, Islamic Republic of; Iraq; Ireland; Italy; Lebanon; Liechtenstein; Lithuania; Luxembourg; Macedonia, the former Yugoslav Republic of; Montenegro; Morocco; Netherlands; Norway; Poland; Portugal; Romania; Russian Federation; Serbia; Slovakia; Slovenia; Spain; Sweden; Switzerland; Syrian Arab Republic; Tunisia; Turkey; Ukraine; United Kingdom.

== Habitat ==
The typical habitats of Orthetrum coerulescens are pools and streams in acidic heath land, where it is sometimes seen alongside golden-ringed dragonflies.

Pools and streams in wet heathland sites are favoured.

== Description ==
Orthetrum coerulescens can reach a body length of 40–44 millimetres (1.6–1.7 in). These dragonflies have a thorax with pale yellow ante-humeral stripes. In the males the color of these stripes fades with age. The abdomen is rather slim and shows an evident dorsal keel. Males have blue-grey eyes and a blue pruinescence on the abdomen, developed with age. Young males are yellow-brown. On the contrary some (androchrome) females at the end of the reproductive cycle assume the bluish color of the male. In the female the abdomen is yellowish-brown, with a thin median black line and small transverse lines to the connections of the various segments. The hyaline wings have yellow costa and a long yellow-brown pterostigma (about 4 mm). They are usually hold well forward at rest.

This species resembles the black-tailed skimmer but is smaller and slimmer and the male has no black tip. Females and immature males lack the black abdominal pattern.

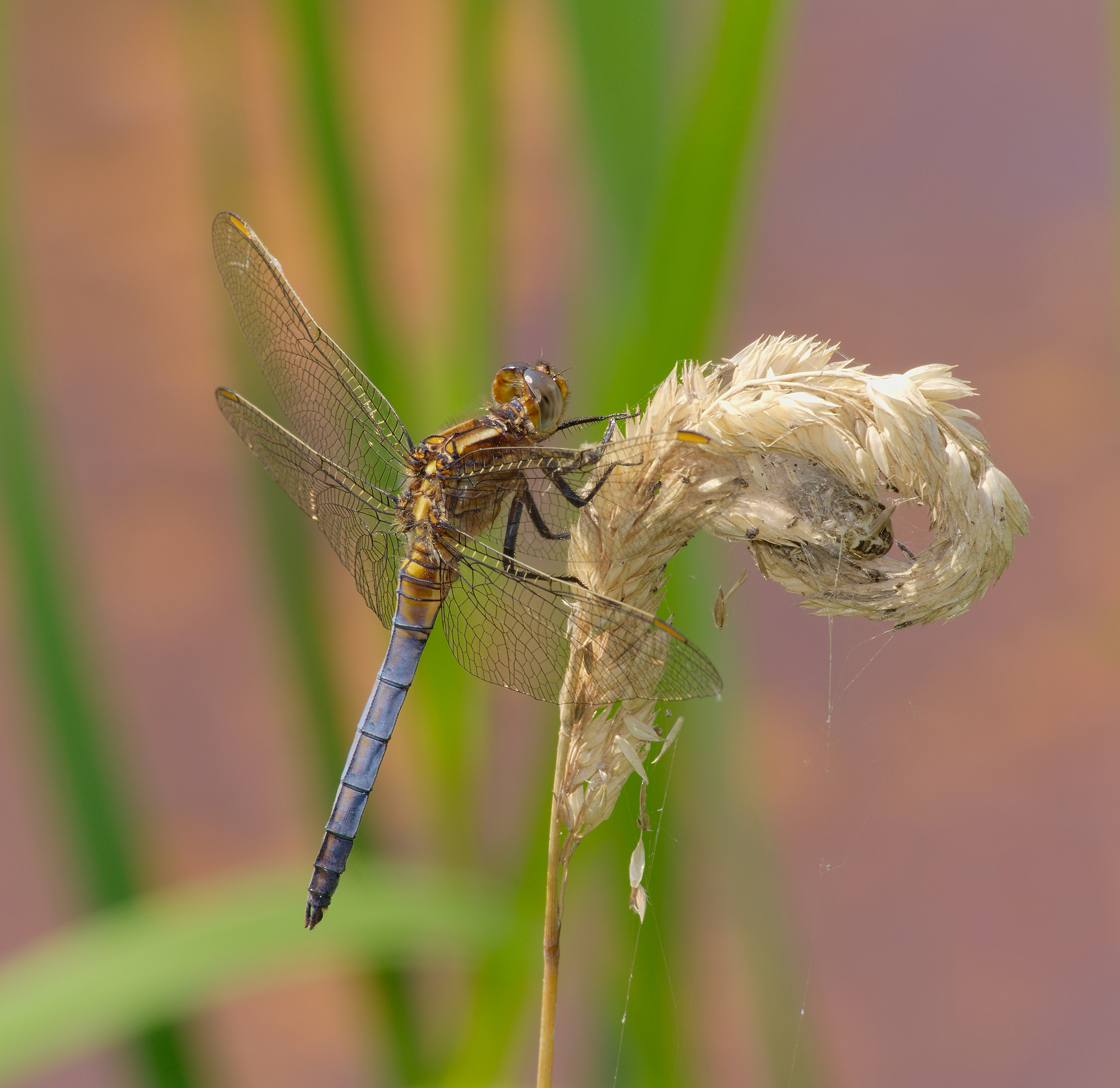
Immature male

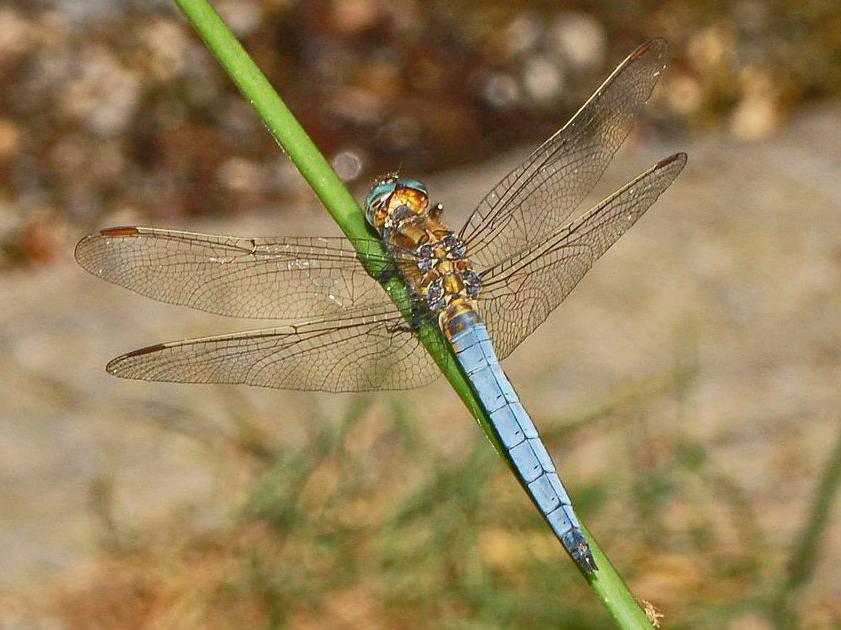
Almost mature male

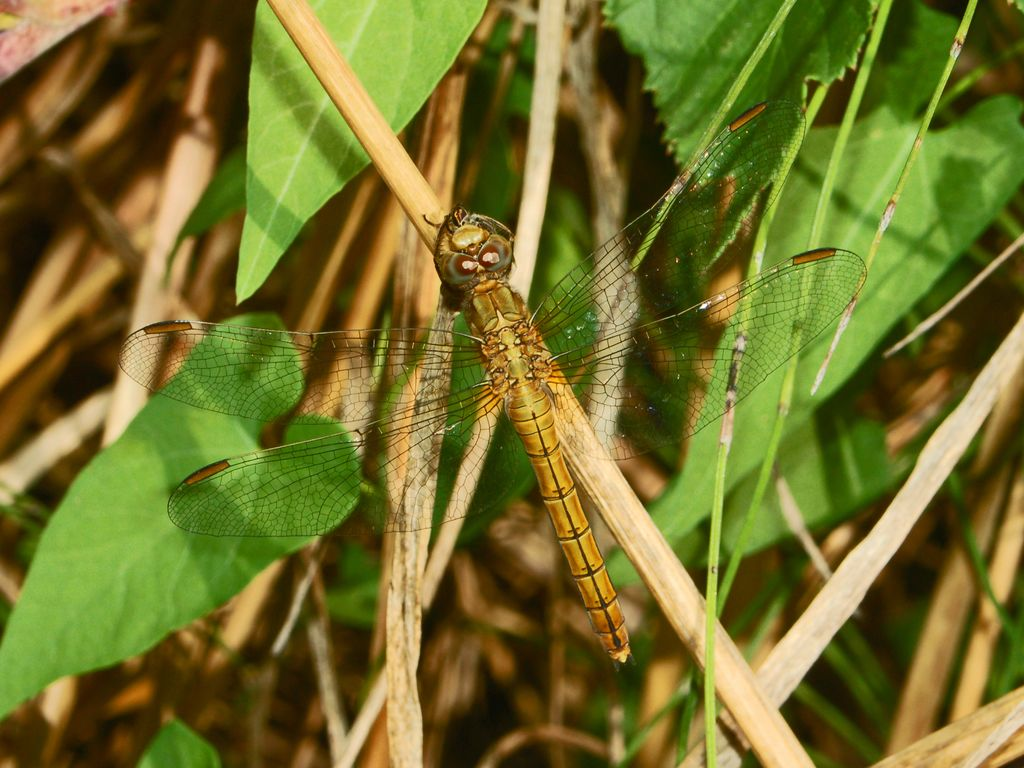
Mature female

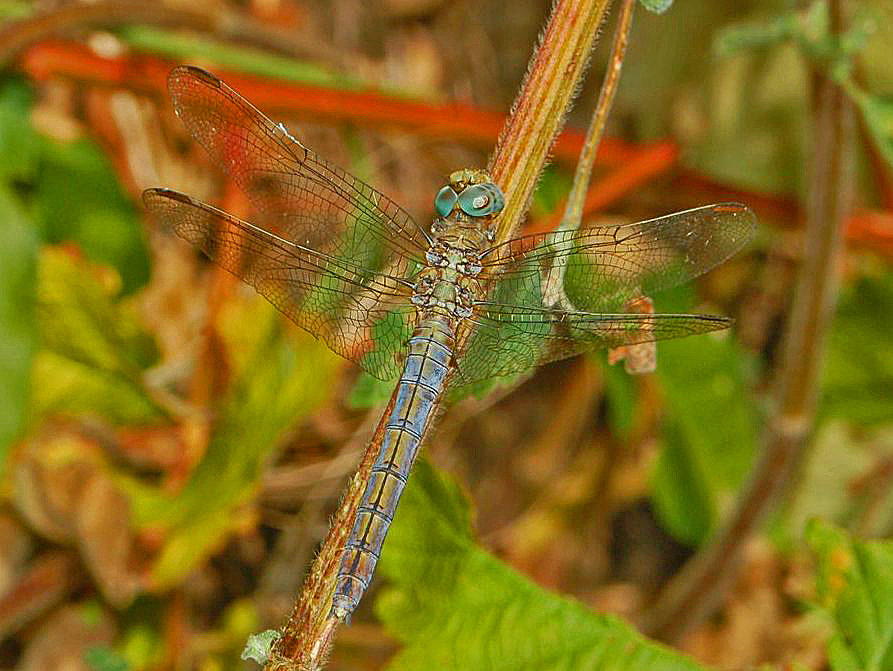
Androchrome female

== Biology and behaviour ==
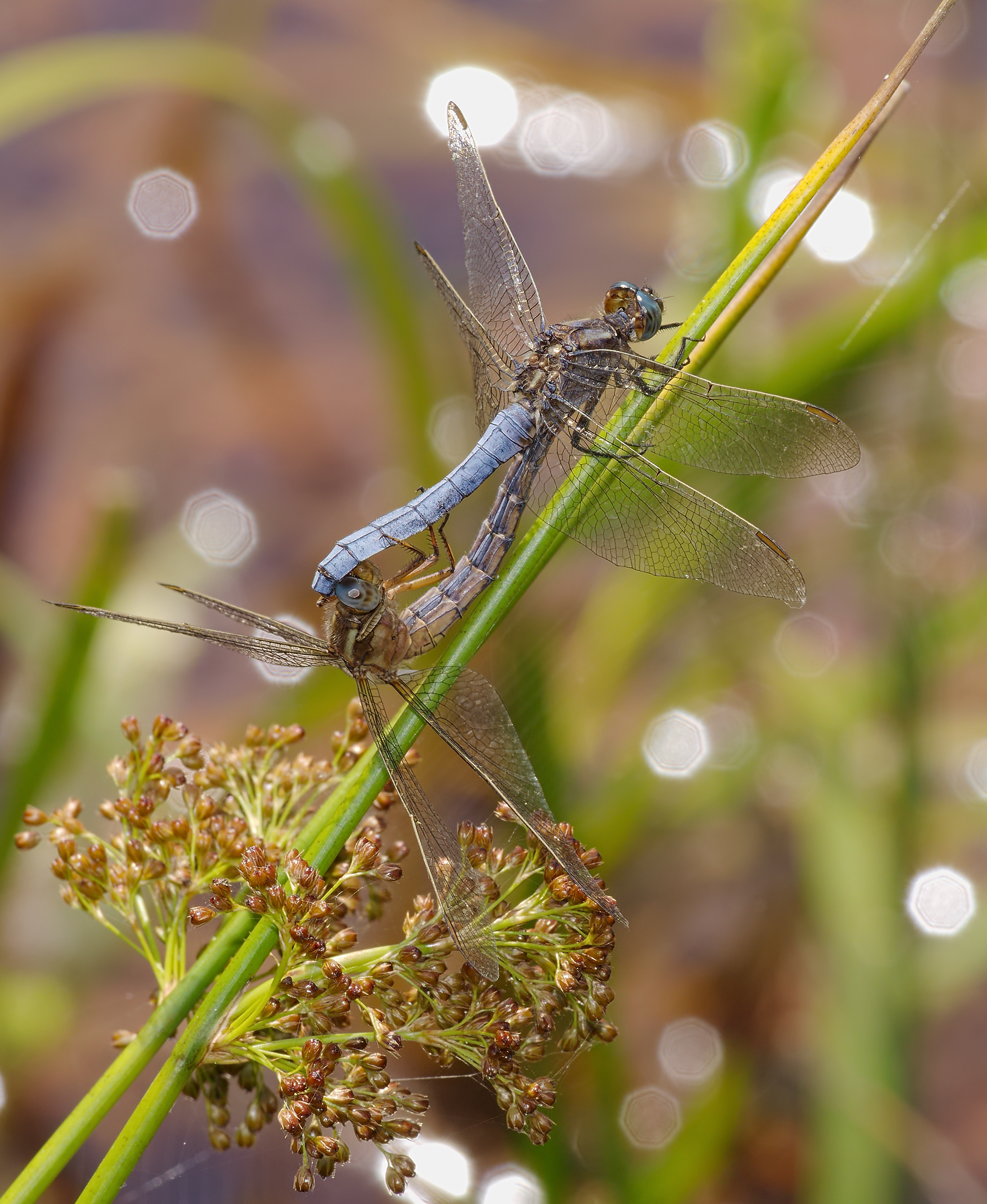
Mating wheel

Adults fly (in the UK) from June to September. Its flight is quite skittish, with frequent hovering, and it lands often. It can fly quite a distance from water, despite its seemingly weak flight. When it perches, the wings are held forward. This species breed mainly in peat bogs. The mating lasts between 5 and 120 seconds. The mating wheel usually lands, but not always. After copulation and a short rest period on the side of the male, the female flies, followed by the male to the water and lays the eggs in flight by touching the surface of the water. The larvae develop in running water but also in stagnant waters (ponds, peat bogs, etc.). After five to six weeks, the larvae hatch. Their development cycle is estimated in two years.

== See also ==
- List of British dragonflies

== Bibliography ==
- Robert, Paul-A. (1959): Die Libellen (Odonaten) - Autorisierte Übersetzung von Otto Paul Wenger [S. 300ff], Kümmerly & Frey, Geographischer Verlag, Bern.
- Dreyer, W. (1986): Die Libellen – Das umfassende Handbuch zur Biologie und Ökologie aller mitteleuropäischen Arten mit Bestimmungsschlüsseln für Imagines und Larven [S. 88], Gerstenberg Verlag, Hildesheim, ISBN 3-8067-2022-3
- Sternberg, K. & R. Buchwald (2000): Orthetrum coerulescens (Fabricius, 1798) – Kleiner Blaupfeil. S. 506–523. In: Sternberg, K. & R. Buchwald (Hrsg.): Die Libellen Baden-Württembergs. Band 2: Großlibellen (Anisoptera). Ulmer, Stuttgart, ISBN 3-8001-3514-0
