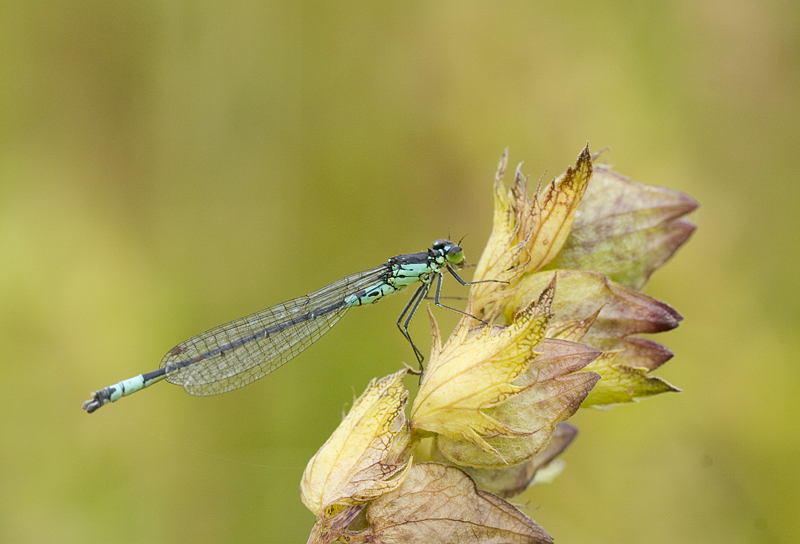
- Male C. armatum, Sweden.

Conservation status
- Least Concern (IUCN 3.1)

Scientific classification
- Kingdom: Animalia
- Phylum: Arthropoda
- Class: Insecta
- Order: Odonata
- Suborder: Zygoptera
- Family: Coenagrionidae
- Genus: Coenagrion
- Species: C. armatum

Binomial name
- Coenagrion armatum (Charpentier, 1840)

= Norfolk damselfly =

Species of insect

The Norfolk damselfly, Norfolk coenagrion or dark bluet (Coenagrion armatum) is a species of blue damselfly in the family Coenagrionidae, native to northern Eurasia from the Netherlands and Norway east to Kamchatka.

== Name ==
This species acquired its common name from its discovery in 1903 and its presence in a very restricted area of the Norfolk Broads, England.

== Identification ==
At first glance, this damselfly may resemble a blue-tailed damselfly or a red-eyed damselfly more than a typical Coenagrion species. Both sexes have a distinctive black abdomen with coloured segments at both the base and the tip. Males have very large appendages that distinguish them from similar species.

== Breeding ==
It breeds in ponds ditches and slow rivers with open helophyte vegetation (particularly in sparse Phragmites australis, Carex spp., and Equisetum fluviatile) and with oligotrophic water quality. It is abundant in northeastern Europe.

Its breeding biology is poorly known. The eggs are laid in the stems and leaves of aquatic plants. The larvae live among aquatic plants and probably emerge after one year.

== Behaviour ==
It was recorded in Britain from late May to late July. The current populations in Western Europe fly earlier and peak in early May. Males perch on floating leaves. It is a strong-flying damselfly.

== Status and distribution ==
It is found from Northern and Eastern Europe eastward to Siberia and Mongolia in Asia. This damselfly became regionally extinct from its sites in Norfolk due to its intolerance of wetland eutrophication. It was believed to be regionally extinct in the Netherlands in the twentieth century, but was rediscovered there in 1999.

=== Status in Britain ===
The species was formerly recorded as a breeding species in Britain, in Norfolk. Records came from Sutton, Stalham, and Hickling Broads. It was last recorded in 1968. Since its current main range is from the Baltic area eastward, the likelihood of recolonisation in Britain seems low, and reintroduction may be needed.
