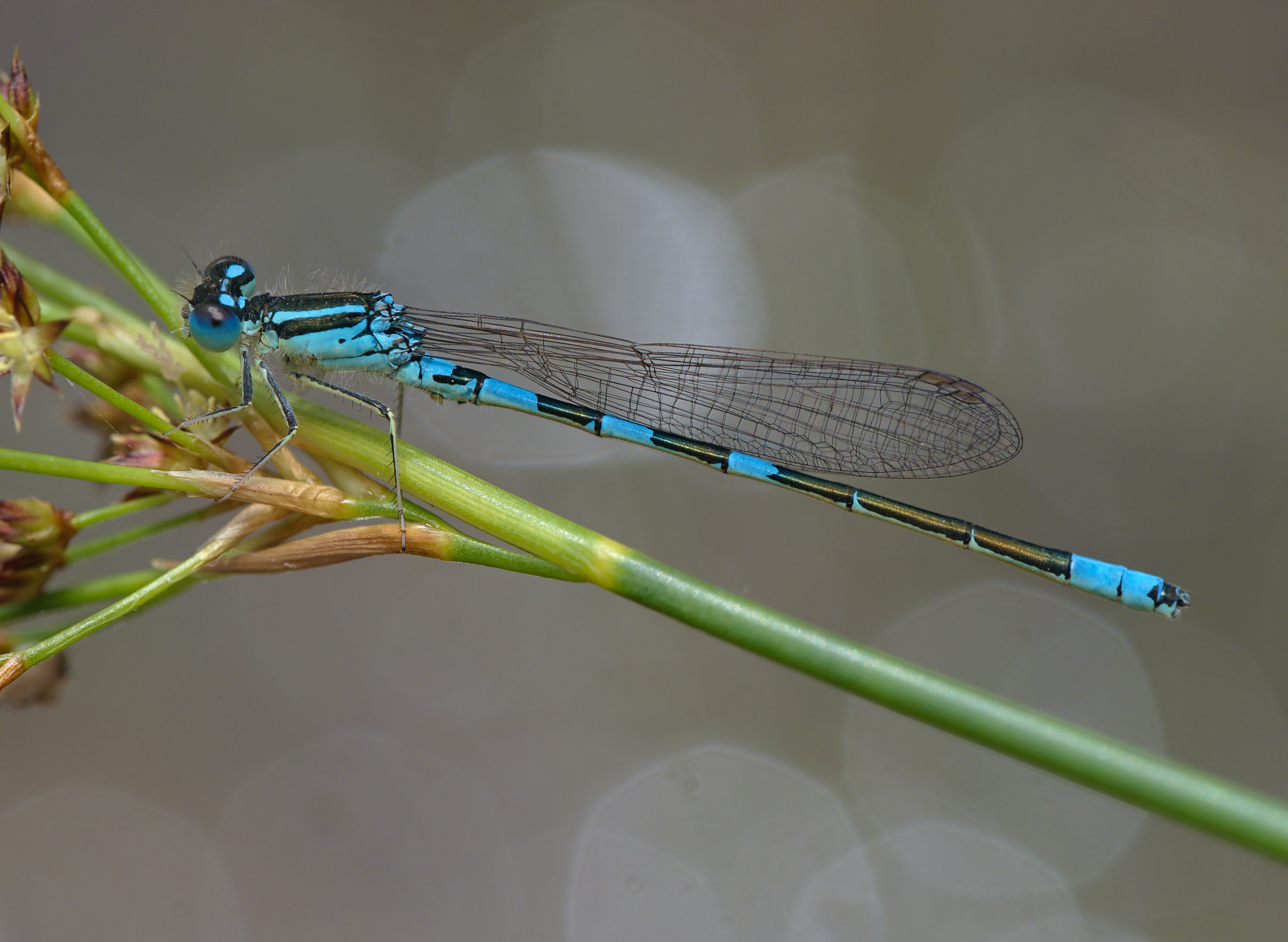
- Male
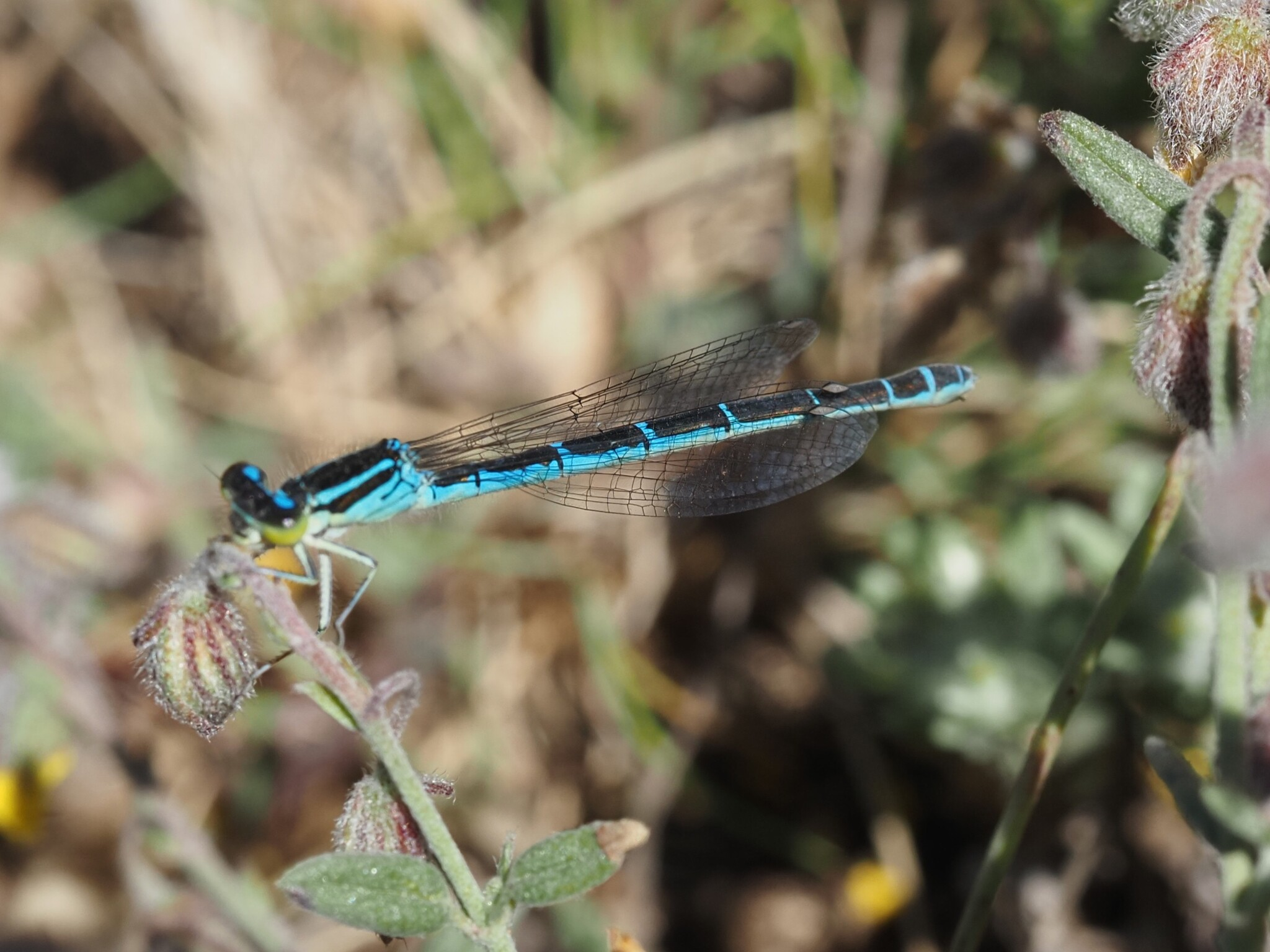
- Female

Conservation status
- Least Concern (IUCN 3.1)

Scientific classification
- Kingdom: Animalia
- Phylum: Arthropoda
- Clade: Pancrustacea
- Class: Insecta
- Order: Odonata
- Suborder: Zygoptera
- Family: Coenagrionidae
- Genus: Coenagrion
- Species: C. scitulum

Binomial name
- Coenagrion scitulum (Rambur, 1842)

= Dainty damselfly =

Species of damselfly

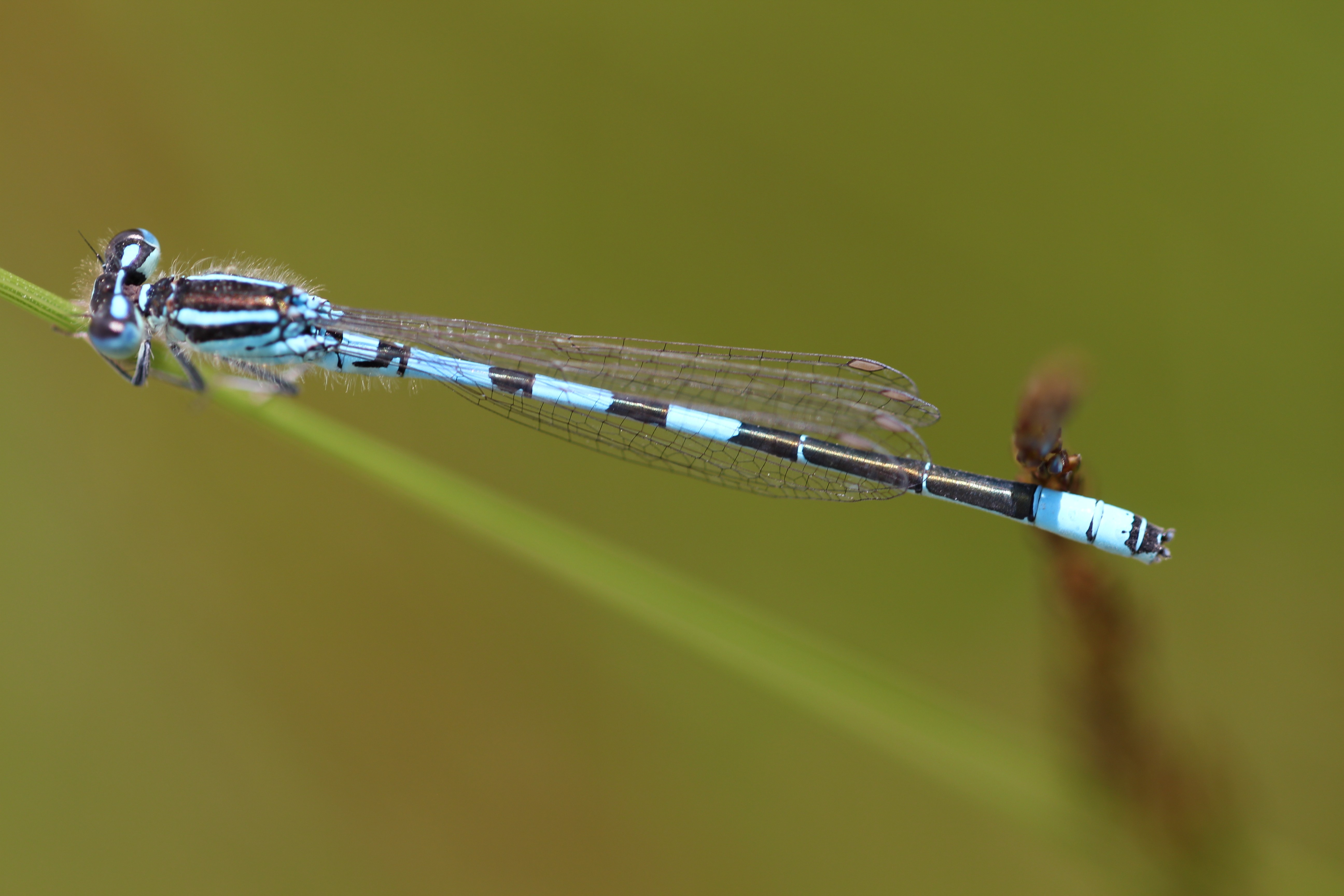
Male dainty damselfly

The dainty damselfly (Coenagrion scitulum), also known as the dainty bluet, is a blue damselfly of the family Coenagrionidae. This is a scarce species found mainly in southern Europe, northern Africa, southwest Asia, and Central America. C. scitulum are Odonata (dragonflies & damselflies) predators that can reach a length of 30–33 mm at maturity and have hind-wing lengths of 15–20 mm. The males and females do exhibit differing features through their colouration making them easily distinguishable. As shown in the photo to the left, segment eight is blue in colour followed by black markings on segment nine, whereas the females are mostly black near the rear with smaller blue markings. Although they are relatively simple to sex, they are easily confused with the common blue damselfly.

== Habitat ==
C. scitulum are found in large and generally stagnant, ponds with abundant vegetation including water-milfoil and hornwort, they can also be found in flooded ditches. It has also been discovered that constructed wetlands are an important habitat and sanctuary for C. scitulum. This is because these areas lack fish that prey on insects giving the dainty damselfly a safe habitat to live and reproduce in. They are most easily spotted during the months of June and July and males can be most easily observed perched on floating vegetation in open water. Although dainty damselflies are quite small they do have the ability to travel distances between ponds if resources become sparse and if the benefits outweighs the cost. We also see evidence of their movement through the recolonization of the lost population in Britain.

== Reproduction ==
C. scitulum exhibits unique mating habits compared to other Odonates. In damselfly reproduction there is indirect insemination. The male damselfly will pass their sperm from the testes to the penis in order for the female to obtain it from them. This translocation of sperm only happens once in all other species of damselflies. In C. scitulum this process happens upwards to six times during the copulation cycle. There are a few hypotheses as to why this process may occur, one of them being that several sperm translocations may be needed to achieve full insemination. After this process is done and the female has successfully fertilized her eggs, she then lays them. The male is usually still attached to the female at this point to stop other males from removing their sperm, although sperm removal is harder in C. scitulum as they do not have the spines on the horns of their penis as other damselflies do. The dainty damselfly seems to be univoltine in their core populations and in their expansion populations, this was exhibited when ponds were sampled and they showed that each was a separate population.

== Conservation status ==
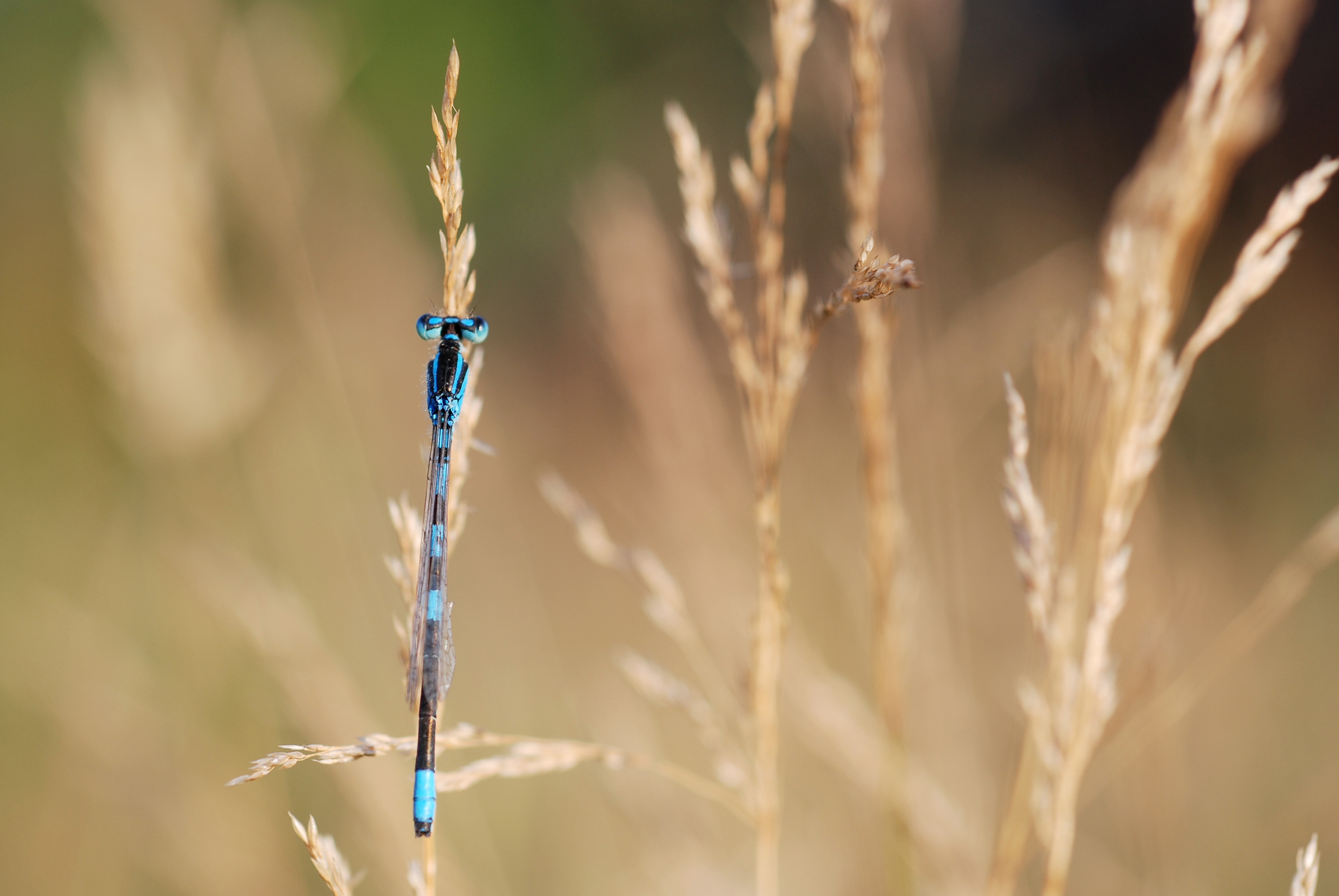
Male C. scitulum

The dainty damselfly was formerly recorded as a breeding species in Britain and had thought to have become locally extinct after the North Sea flood of 1953. There was a large viable population in East Anglia, but after the flood many seasons passed by without any sightings of the dainty damselfly leading to the conclusion that they had been extirpated. In 2010, after 57 years without sightings, it had been positively identified and rediscovered in Kent. This meant that there had to have been a viable population all along, it just had diminished to critical numbers. The dainty damselfly is able to disperse quite widely so it is a possibility that a neighbouring population made its way back into the area.

The current status of C. scitulum according to IUCN Red List is of 'Least Concern', meaning that the population is considered stable according to the IUCN's criteria.

== Distribution and geographic movement ==
=== Distribution ===
The dainty damselfly is mostly found in western Europe, northwest Africa, western Caspian and the south Caucasus regions. It can also be found in Eastern Europe. There seems to be another population of C. scitulum in central Asia and it's not clear if this is a separate species or if they traveled from the European population across the mountains of Afghanistan and northern Iran.

=== Geographic movement ===
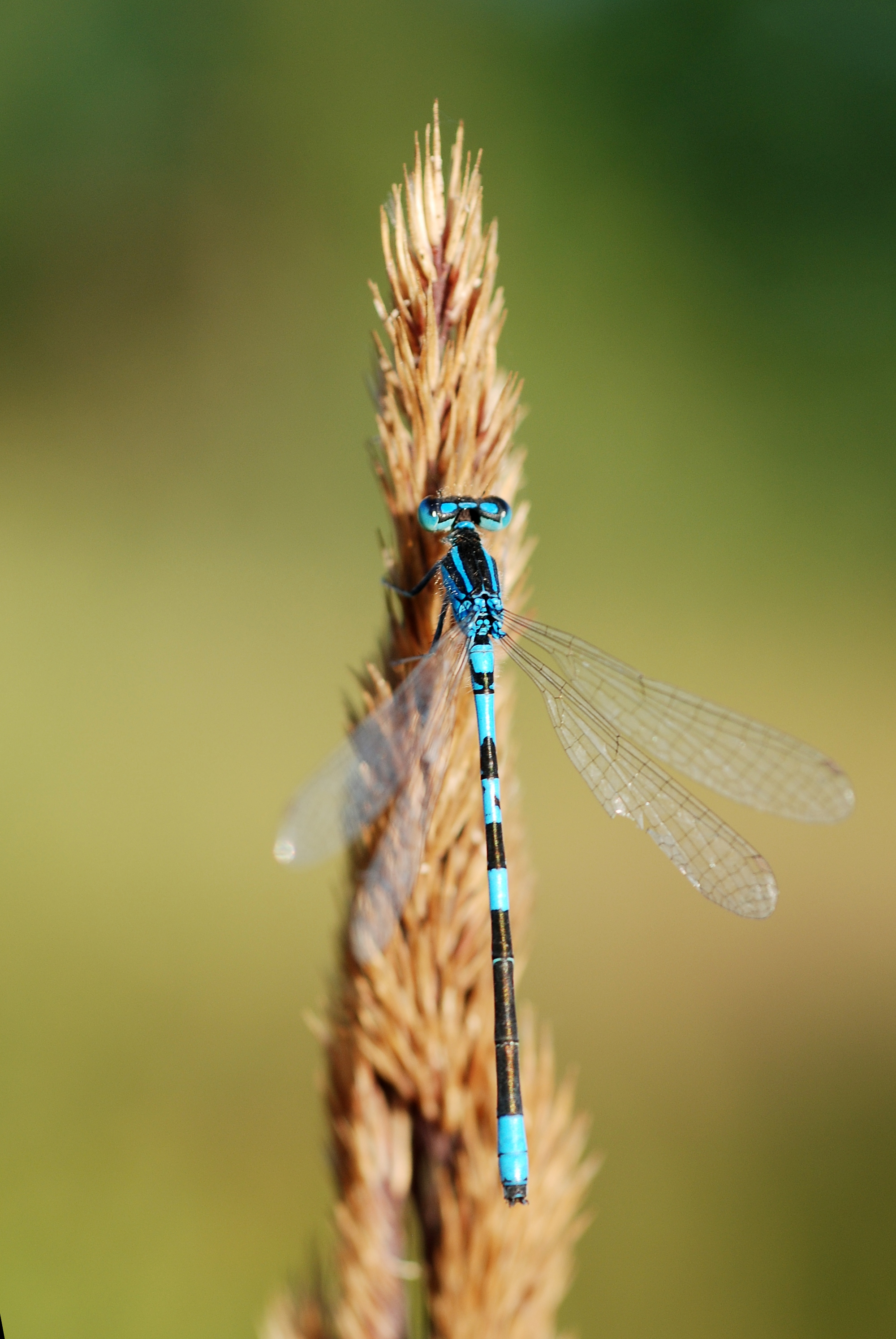
Male C. scitulum

There are many factors contributing to the geographic movement of C. scitulum some of these include changing temperatures, land disruption and decreasing water levels. The number one cause of dispersal in dainty damselflies is rising temperatures as they tract their optimal thermal niche to new locations. In the 1990s the most northern edge of their range was located in northern France. Due to climate change though there has been an increased poleward distribution, and now the dainty damselfly's populations have expanded from historical ranges and has founded edge populations in a northward, eastward and westward direction.

This poleward expansion has been associated with rapid phenotypic change and founder effects including reduction in genetic diversity and increases in genetic differentiation. It has been found that the new edge populations are genetically differentiated from the core populations and all of the new populations were differentiated from each other giving indication that each range expansion is independent. There are some issues with the changes in genetic diversity though. There has been studies completed on the dainty damselfly showing that genetic diversity can influence the success of colonization and can decrease resistance to stress and disease. This can make the insect more susceptible to toxins such as pesticides which in turn also affects the dainty damselflies' ability to continue their dispersal through slow movement, reduced population growth and flight ability. The dainty damselflies are being exposed to pesticides more frequently due to their dispersal and need to cross agricultural land to reach new habitats. It's not just dispersal due to climate change that causes the genetic changes in the dainty damselfly though, it can also happen due to natural range expansion as well. The genetic diversity and structure of dainty damselflies are shaped by both historical rapid range expansions and contemporary processes causing dispersal like environmental factors (climate change).
