= Journal of the British Dragonfly Society =

- Discipline: Entomology
- Language: English

Publication details
- History: 1983–present
- Publisher: British Dragonfly Society (United Kingdom)
- Frequency: Biannually

Standard abbreviations
- ISO 4: J. Br. Dragonfly Soc.

Indexing
- ISSN: 1357-2342
- OCLC no.: 214815338

Links
- Journal homepage

The Journal of the British Dragonfly Society is a scientific journal published twice-yearly by the British Dragonfly Society since 1983. It contains material relevant to Odonata recorded from the United Kingdom. The editor-in-chief is P. J. Mill.

== Abstracting and indexing ==
The journal is abstracted and indexed in The Zoological Record.
