= British Dragonfly Society =

Conservation organization in the United Kingdom

- Founded: 1983
- Founder: Rod Dunn and Bob Merritt
- Location: United Kingdom
- Members: c 1,500
- Key people: Patron Sir David Attenborough
- Employees: 2
- Website: www.british-dragonflies.org.uk

The British Dragonfly Society is a conservation organisation in the United Kingdom. It was founded in 1983 and its aims are to promote and to encourage the study and conservation of dragonflies and damselflies and their natural habitats, especially in the United Kingdom. The Society runs the Dragonfly Recording Network (DRN) to collect Odonata records in the UK. It also promotes a range of research and conservation projects. The British Dragonfly Society is a registered charity, number 800196.

== History ==
The British Dragonfly Society is a conservation organisation in the United Kingdom. It was founded in 1983 with the aim to promote and to encourage the study and conservation of dragonflies and damselflies and their natural habitats, especially in the United Kingdom. The British Dragonfly Society is a registered charity, number 800196. As of 2024, the chair of trustees is Tim Coleshaw.

== Activities ==
The Society runs the Dragonfly Recording Network (DRN) to collect Odonata records in the UK. It also promotes a range of research and conservation projects. In 2021 the Society released a report, State of Dragonflies in Britain and Ireland, analysing over 50 years' worth of recordings, comprising 1.4 million records, to report on the health of dragonfly populations. The report found that many dragonfly species were increasing in number, but some were found in reduced ranges, and there were six new established dragonfly species.

In 2024, the Society named Wicken Fen National Nature Reserve near Ely, in Cambridgeshire a national dragonfly hotspot.

== See also ==
- Odonata
- List of British dragonflies
