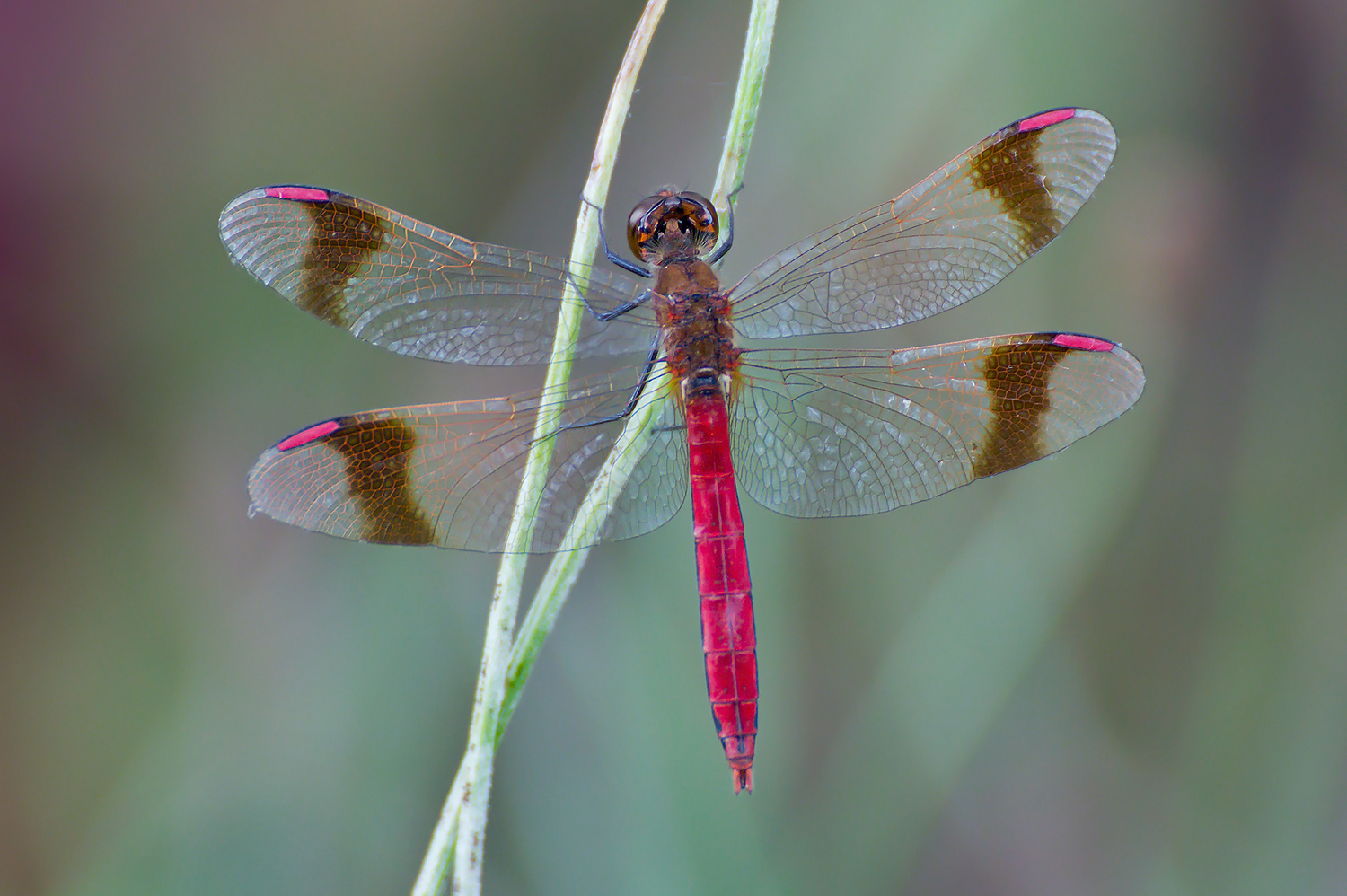

Conservation status
- Least Concern (IUCN 3.1)

Scientific classification
- Kingdom: Animalia
- Phylum: Arthropoda
- Clade: Pancrustacea
- Class: Insecta
- Order: Odonata
- Infraorder: Anisoptera
- Family: Libellulidae
- Genus: Sympetrum
- Species: S. pedemontanum

Binomial name
- Sympetrum pedemontanum (Mueller in Allioni, 1776)

= Banded darter (dragonfly) =

Species of dragonfly

Sympetrum pedemontanum, the banded darter, is a dragonfly belonging to the genus Sympetrum. It is characterized by its small stature, dark wing bands, and red or yellow body. It lives in areas with low vegetation and stagnant or weakly flowing bodies of water. Although debate exists regarding the taxa's relationship to others in its genus, it can most commonly be identified by its wing bands, bilobed prothorax, and possibly its genitalia.

== Habitat and distribution ==
It is wide spread across Eurasia and is known for its tendency to cohabitate in artificial habitats. It is Commonly found in irrigated hay meadows, semipermanent marsh lands, rice paddy fields, and grasslands. Showing a preference for banks with comparatively lower levels of vegetation, they have a tendency for residing around trimmed grass and bodies of water as this is where they lay their eggs. Banded darters lay their eggs in stagnant or weakly flowing shallow water. Members of the Sympetrum family have the ability to detect horizontally polarized reflected light which allows them to find bodies of water and subsequently make their homes there.

== Life cycle ==
Sympetrum pedemontanum displays fluctuating and cyclical population growth. Males form tandem pairs with females displaying weak territoriality. Females dip their abdomen into water to lay their eggs while males guard the females. Although many species of Sympetrum have been known to display terrestrial oviposition. Eggs of sympetrum typically hatch after around 80 to 230 days, and are laid in the summer. The eggs undergo an overwinter period where larval dragonflies will hatch out in the subsequent summer. The larvae mature and Adults typically emerge in summer with juveniles maturing in mid summer. In Europe banded darters can be seen from mid July to around the end of October.

== Characteristics ==
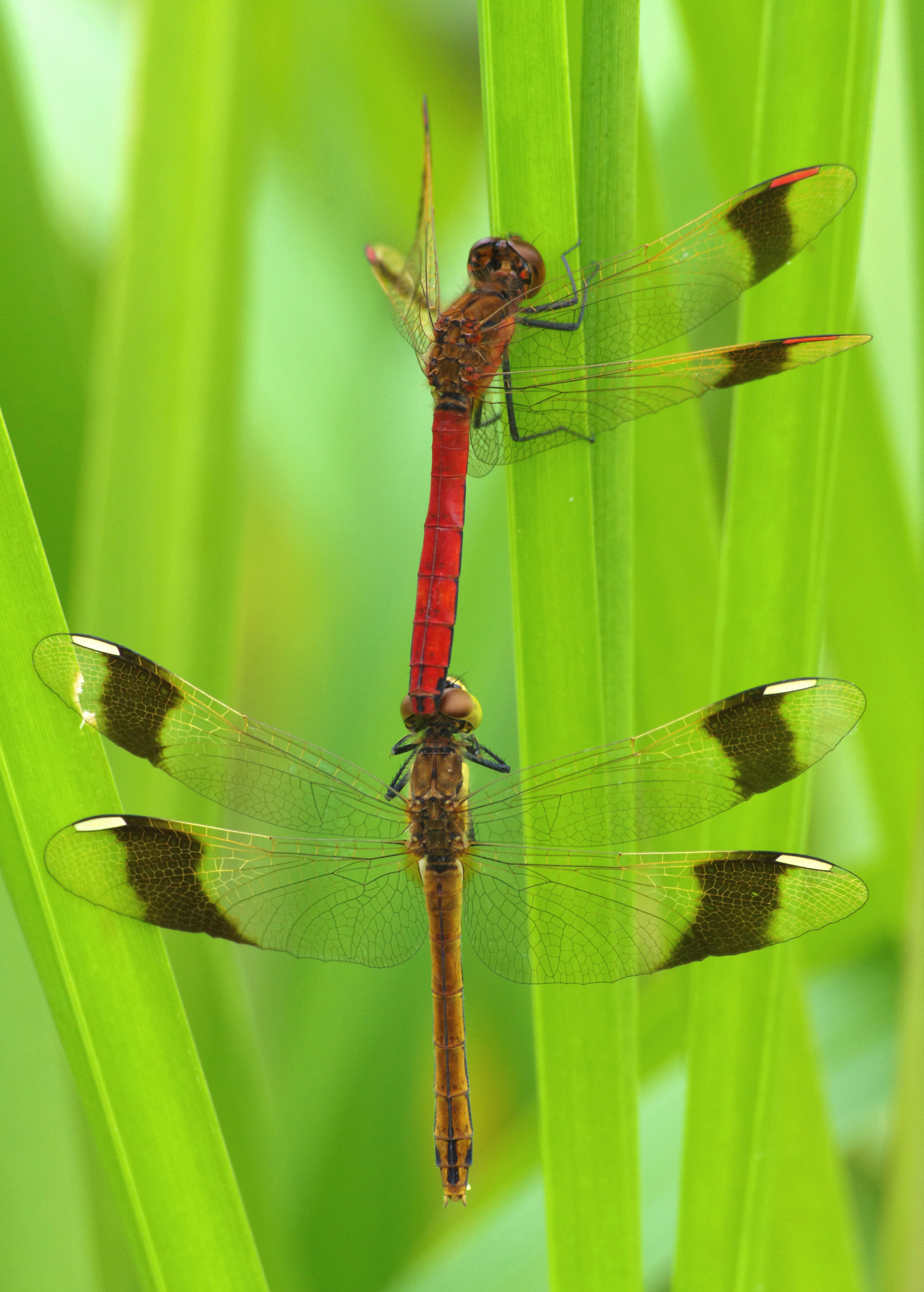
SympetrumPedemontanumTandem

Sympetrum pedemontanum are comparatively smaller than most dragonfly species with an average size of less than 40mm. Banded darters are characterized by the dark bands on their wings which is where they get their name. Bands on the hind wings tend to be slightly wider than the bands on their fore wings, with variability in band size, shape and position seen across age and location as well as high levels of variability across populations. With wider bands being observed in the west as well as the brightest bands being observed in the north. Color intensity of bands tends to increase with age as well as changes in body color, with some juveniles displaying a yellow body color which changes to red in males as the dragonfly ages. Sympetrum females tend to have a yellowish body while males are red or brownish red. Spp pedemontanum, like most dragonflies, is diurnal with compound eyes able to detect colors and process images with high resolution. Distinctive features include its red body in males and yellow body in females, black markings on thorax, abdomen, and legs, and a well developed raised posterior lobe, and its distinctive banded wings. Sometimes females can be confused with males within the taxa Orthetrum anceps due to the similar yellow body color but can be easily discerned by the presence of antehumeral stripes exhibited by O. anceps.

== Feeding ==
Dragonflies are predators and voracious aerial hunters, Sympetrum pedemontanum is no different. Employing a method of underside attack and using its compound eyes to help the dragonfly catch its prey. Prey for adults consists of a variety of small insects. Sympetrum in the larval stages keep their predatory nature and feed on many small pond organisms. The larval diet may consist of tadpoles, mosquitos and mayfly larvae, and small crustaceans.

== Taxonomy ==
Sympetrum pedemontanum belongs to a family consisting of three other dragonfly taxa: Sympetrum intermedium, Sympetrum kurentzovi, and Sympetrum elatum. A lack of synapomorphies makes the taxa difficult to characterize and leaves it open to debate about which species belong to the genus. A common feature among sympetrum is a bilobed prothorax adorned with long setae, however this trait is also seen in similar genus of dragonflies. North American species have more morphological similarities to palearctic and nearctic species but the similarities have not yet been addressed. One synapomorphy of the genus seems to be a similarity between genitalia but this is also a weak and somewhat unreliable synapomorphy.
