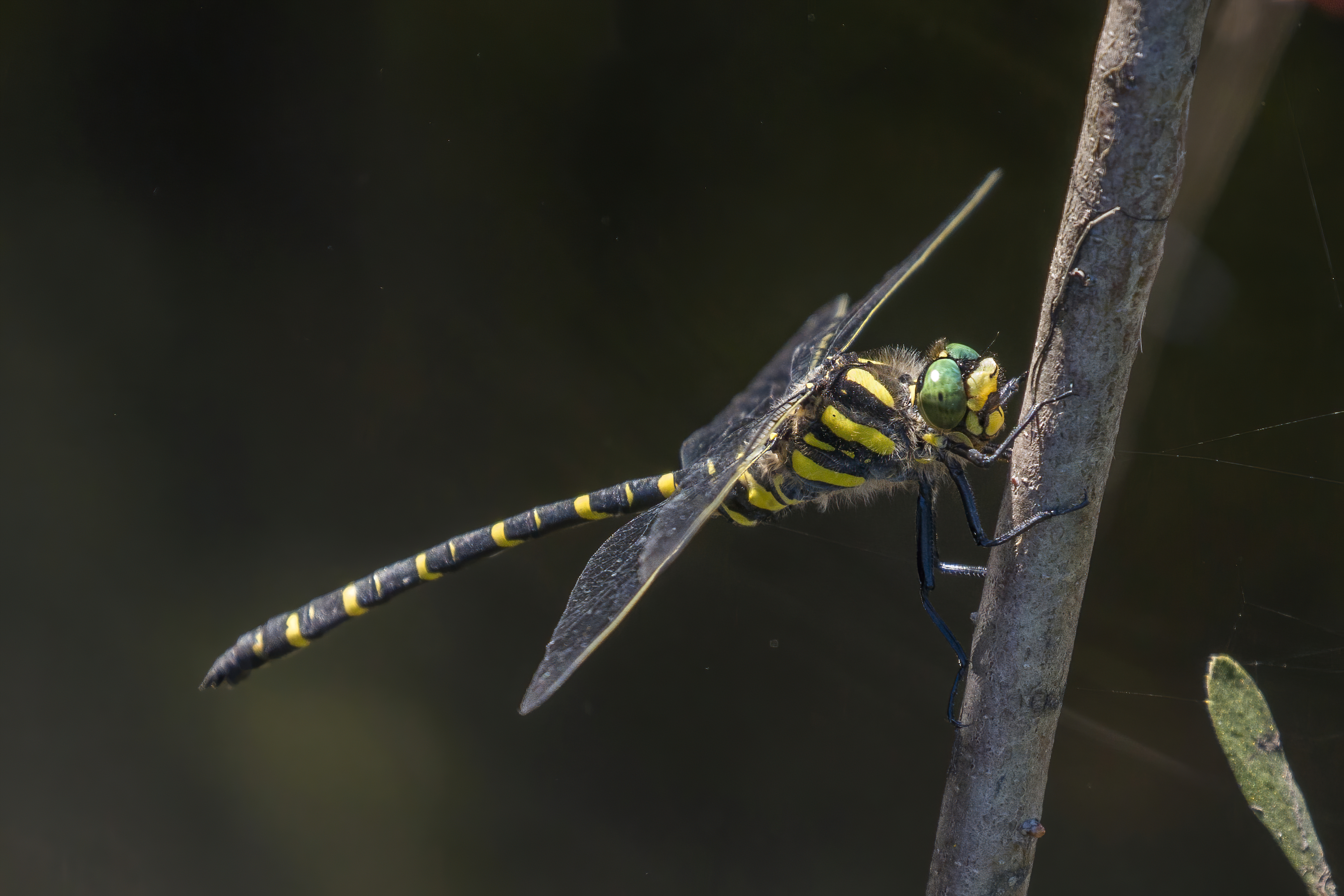
- Male in Fermyn Woods, Northamptonshire, UK
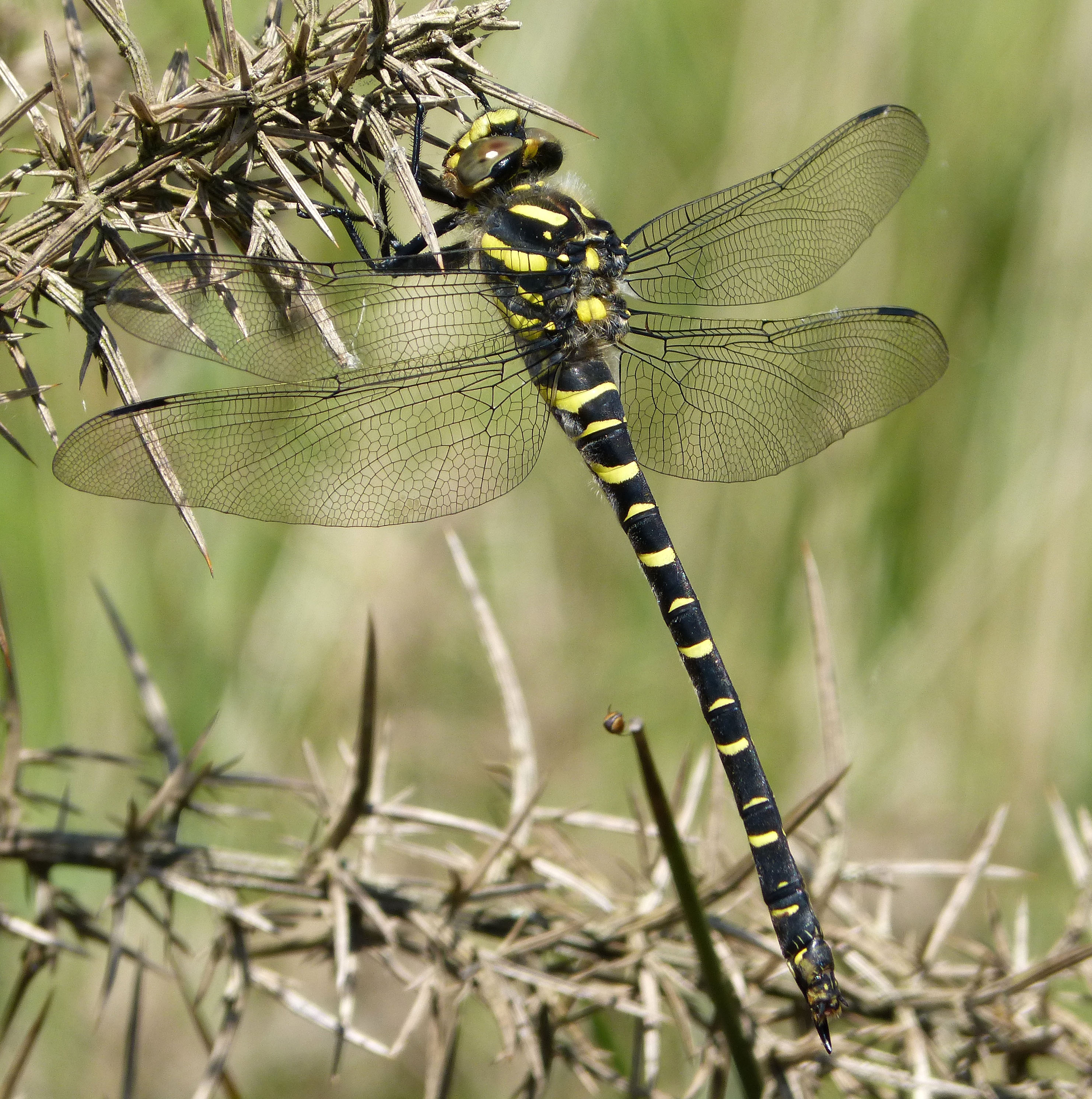
- Female in Arne, Dorset, UK

Conservation status
- Least Concern (IUCN 3.1)

Scientific classification
- Kingdom: Animalia
- Phylum: Arthropoda
- Clade: Pancrustacea
- Class: Insecta
- Order: Odonata
- Infraorder: Anisoptera
- Superfamily: Cordulegastroidea
- Family: Cordulegastridae
- Genus: Cordulegaster
- Species: C. boltonii

Binomial name
- Cordulegaster boltonii (Donovan, 1807)

Synonyms
- Libellula grandis Scopoli, 1763 (Preocc.); Libellula forcipata Harris, 1780 (Preocc.); Aeshna annulata Latreille, 1805 (Preocc.); Libellula boltonii Donovan, 1807; Cordulegaster boltoni Auctt. (Missp.); Cordulegaster lunulata Charpentier, 1840; Cordulegaster annulatus immaculifrons Selys, 1850; Cordulegaster annulatus intermedius Selys, 1857; Cordulegaster boltonii intermedia (Selys, 1857); Aeschna lorenzonii Disconzi, 1865; Cordulegaster algerica Morton, 1916; Cordulegaster algirica Auctt. (Missp.); Cordulegaster boltonii iberica Boudot & Jacquemin 1995

= Golden-ringed dragonfly =

Species of dragonfly

The golden-ringed dragonfly (Cordulegaster boltonii) is a large, striking species of dragonfly found widely in Europe and locally in northwestern Africa, especially near flowing waters like streams. It is the longest British species of dragonfly, and the only member of its genus to be found in the United Kingdom.

== Identification ==
In the United Kingdom, they are easily identified by their distinctive black and yellow stripes, which is not found in any other dragonfly in the country. A very large species, males average 74 mm (2.9 in) and the longer females average 84 mm (3.3 in). Wingspan is up to 101 mm (4.0 in). The female is the longest British dragonfly, in part due to the unusually long ovipositor, and in other measurements it is exceeded by the emperor (Anax imperator).

== Larvae ==
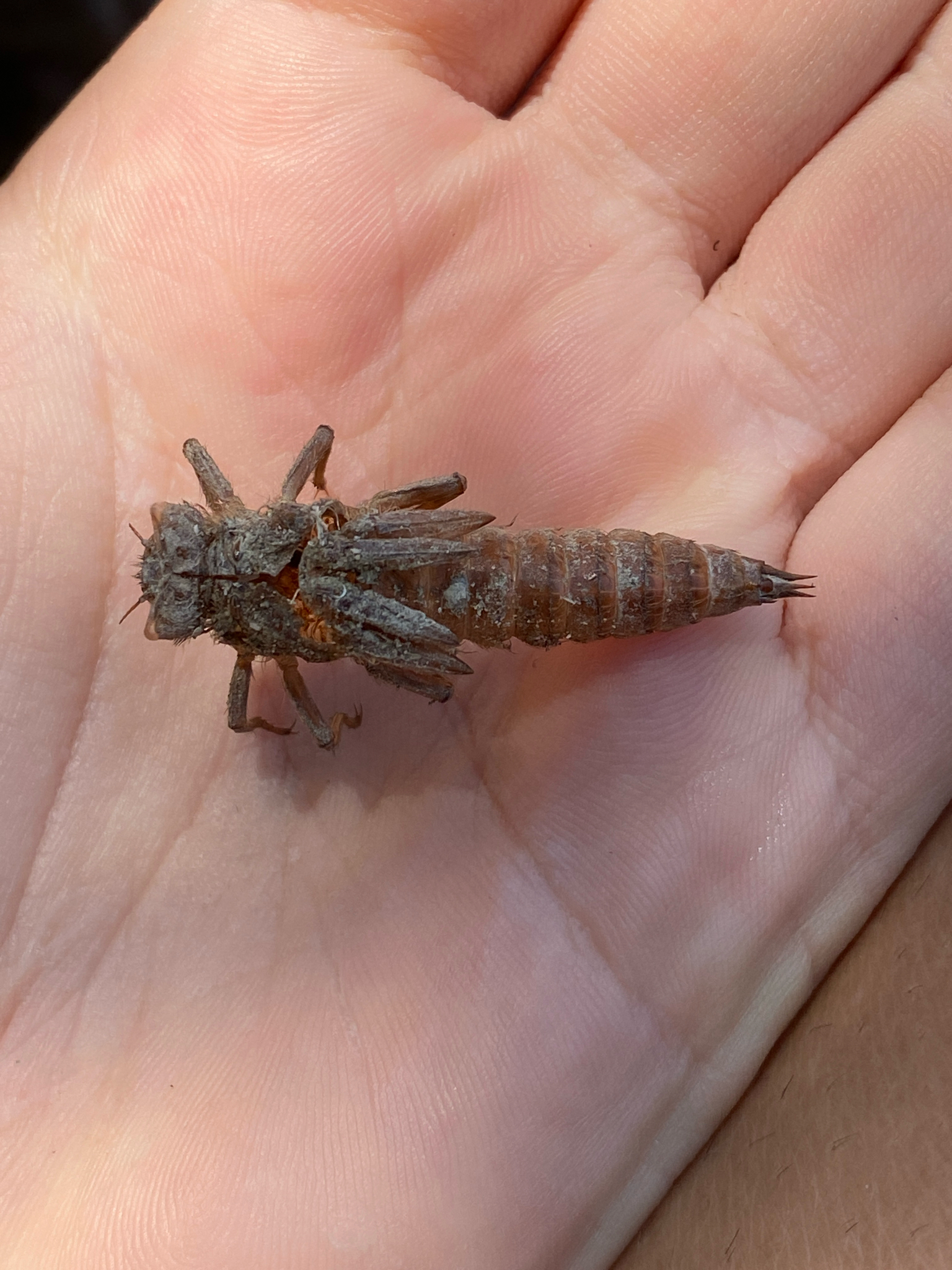
Exuvia, France

The female lays the eggs in shallow water. The hairy larvae live at the bottom of the water and are well camouflaged amongst the silt. They emerge after about 2–5 years, and usually under the cover of darkness.

== Behaviour ==
They are often seen flying leisurely over mountain streams or a river; they also occasionally show up at a pond. They are also typically seen flying over heath land. Their bright yellow and black stripes make them easy to identify, even from a fair distance away. They feed mainly on insects ranging from small prey such as midges to flies, butterflies and even bumblebees. This strikingly-coloured insect is incredibly aerobatic and they sometimes fly very high up into the sky.

== See also ==
- List of British dragonflies
