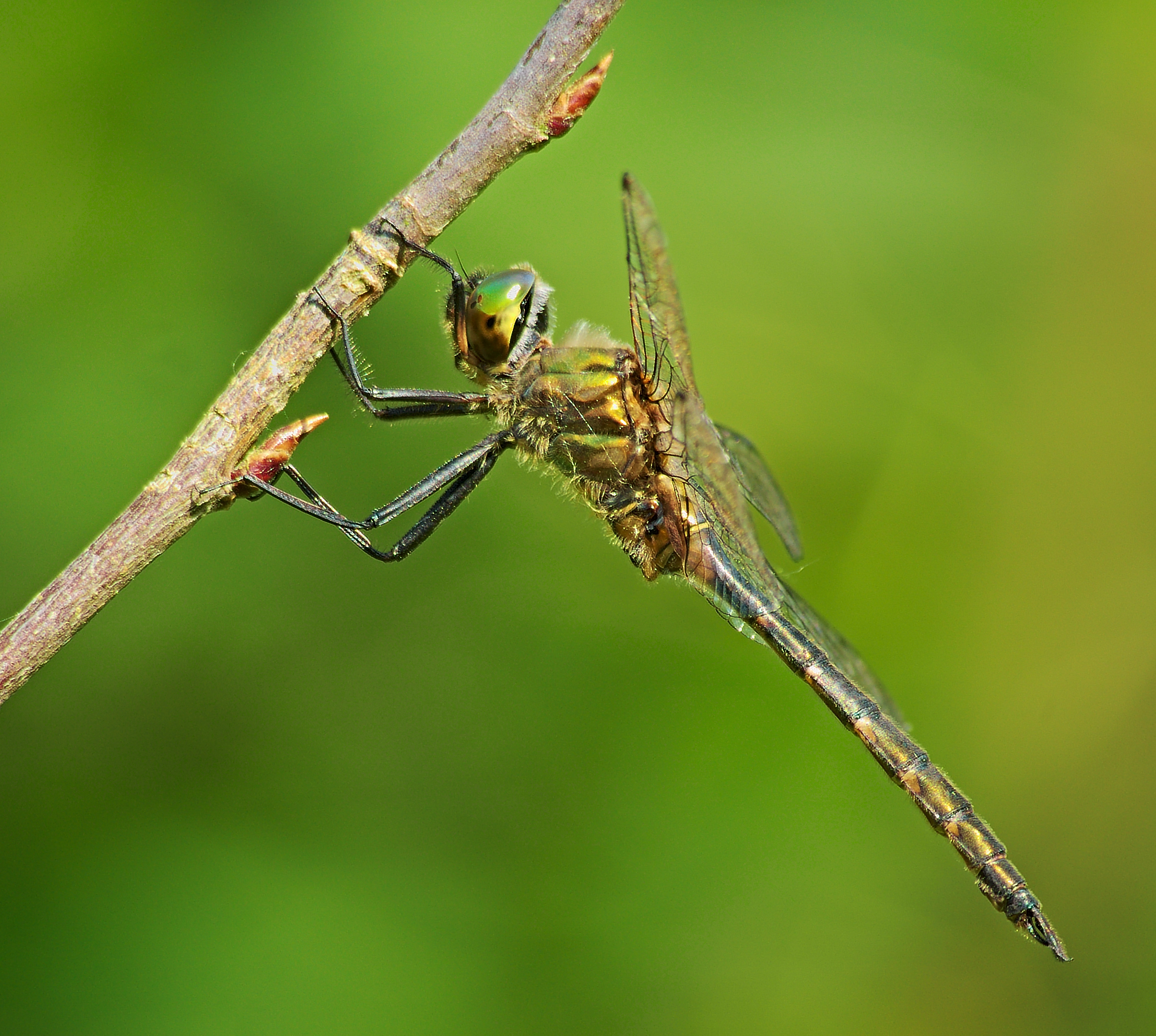
- Male S. flavomaculata

Conservation status
- Least Concern (IUCN 3.1)

Scientific classification
- Kingdom: Animalia
- Phylum: Arthropoda
- Clade: Pancrustacea
- Class: Insecta
- Order: Odonata
- Infraorder: Anisoptera
- Superfamily: Libelluloidea
- Family: Corduliidae
- Genus: Somatochlora
- Species: S. flavomaculata

Binomial name
- Somatochlora flavomaculata (Vander Linden, 1825)

Synonyms
- Libellula flavomaculata Vander Linden, 1825; Cordulia vicetina Disconzi, 1865

= Somatochlora flavomaculata =

Species of dragonfly

Somatochlora flavomaculata, also called yellow-spotted emerald, is a common species of dragonfly in the family Corduliidae. Its distribution stretches from France to Siberia and Mongolia. It frequents wetlands in its range. The males are known to defend their territory.

== Identification ==
Unlike other dragonflies that are metallic green, the species has yellow spots on its thorax and abdomen. Females have the largest spots, and the spots are brighter on young specimens. Spots on the abdomen become darker as an individual ages and may later become almost invisible. The species is similar to Somatochlora metallica, also known as brilliant emerald, but it has more yellow on top of its abdomen with yellow going down its sides. S. flavomaculata is also smaller than S. metallica.

== Behavior ==
The males defend their territory on dry vegetation, paths by bushes and trees, in a reedbed's glades, and waterbodies. Near the end of its breeding cycle, the waterbodies are often patrolled by the males. Their mating wheel, in which they mate while in the shape of a wheel, may be seen circling for a few minutes each time above reedbeds.

== Distribution ==
Somatochlora flavomaculata can be commonly found in wetlands in continental Europe, with populations being found from northern France to Siberia and Mongolia. It was first discovered in the United Kingdom in 2018 at Carlton and Oulton Marshes by wildlife photographer Andrew Easton, who appealed to users on Twitter to identify the species. The species may have been carried to the UK by easterly winds in the spring and summer despite not being known to travel for long distances. The species was used to indicate species richness in central Sweden's boreal forests.
