= Atropos (journal) =

- Discipline: Entomology
- Language: English

Publication details
- History: 1996–present
- Publisher: Atropos (UK)

Standard abbreviations
- ISO 4: Atropos

Indexing
- ISSN: 1478-8128

Links
- Journal homepage

Atropos is a UK-based journal for specialists in Lepidoptera and Odonata. It takes its name from the scientific name of the death's-head hawkmoth, Acherontia atropos.

It was first published in May 1996.
