= List of Odonata species of Ireland =

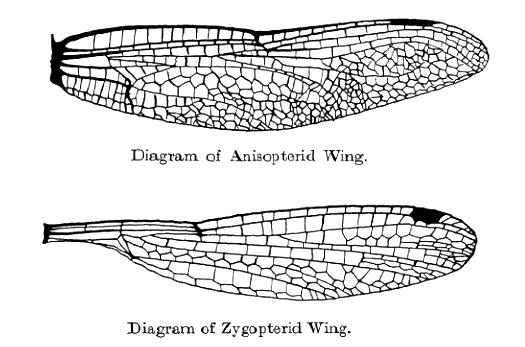
Dragonfly (top) and damselfly (bottom) wing shape and venation. Damselflies are also distinguished by the gap between their eyes, and the fact that they hold their wings folded back over the abdomen while at rest.

The following is a list of Odonata species recorded in Ireland. Common names are those given in the standard literature; where a different name has been given in The Natural History of Ireland's Dragonflies, this is given in brackets. Most of these species are resident, others are vagrants and some have not been recorded since the nineteenth century.

== Suborder Zygoptera (damselflies) ==
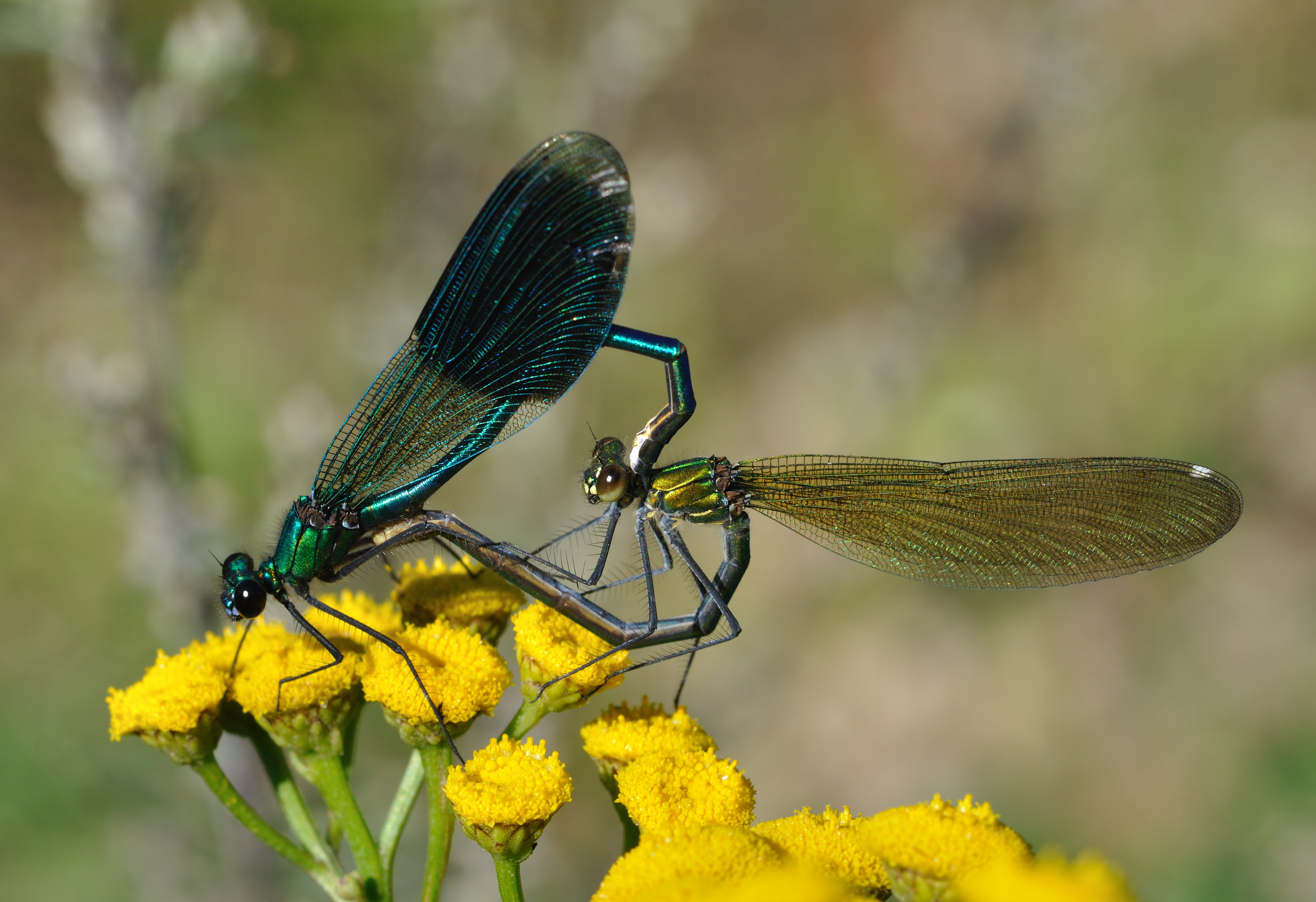
Two banded demoiselles (Calopteryx splendens) mating.

=== Family Calopterygidae (demoiselles) ===
- Banded demoiselle (banded jewelwing) – Calopteryx splendens
- Beautiful demoiselle – Calopteryx virgo

=== Family Lestidae (emerald damselflies) ===
- Scarce emerald damselfly (turlough spreadwing) – Lestes dryas
- Emerald damselfly (common spreadwing) – Lestes sponsa

=== Family Coenagrionidae (blue, blue-tailed, and red damselflies) ===
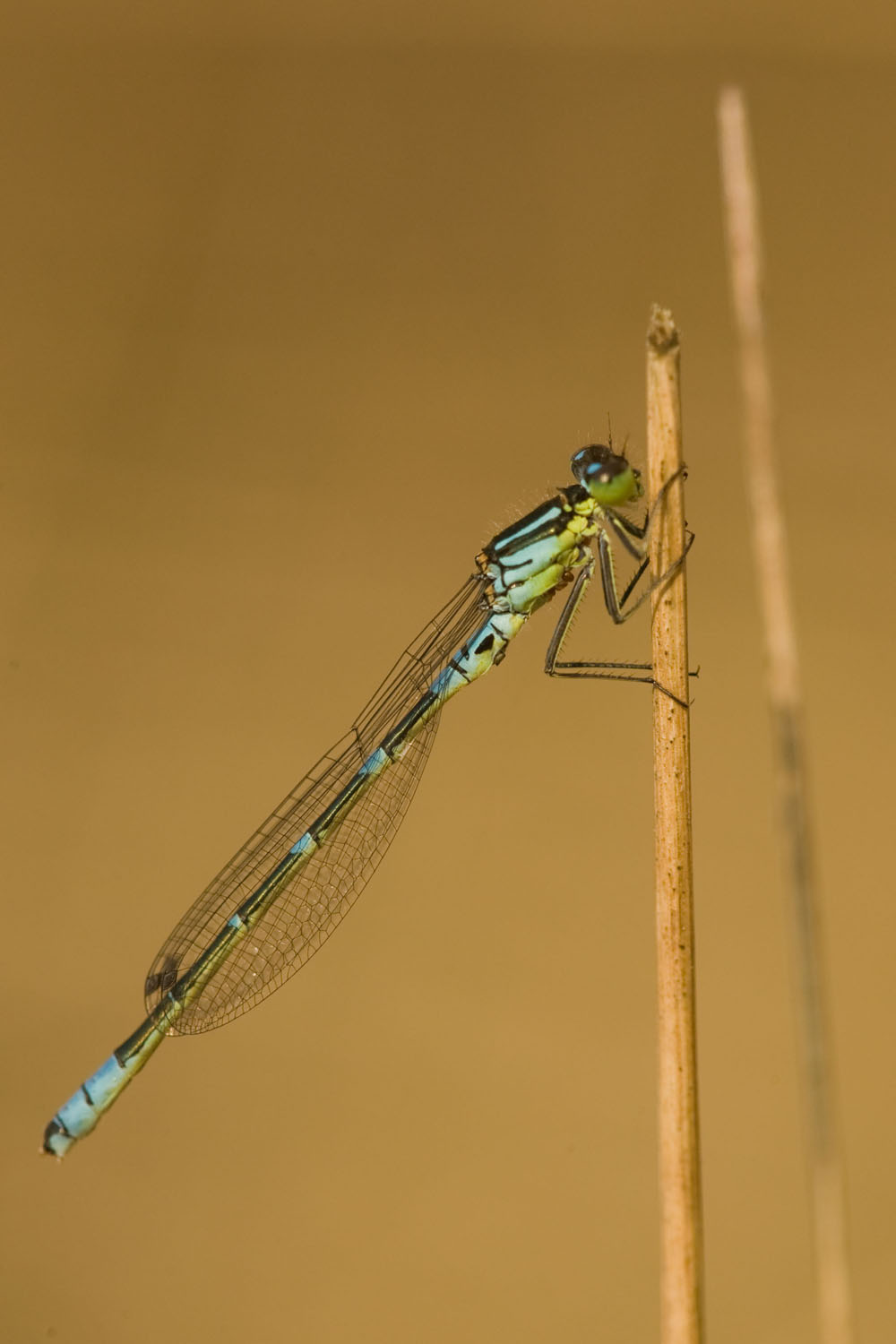
The Irish damselfly (Coenagrion lunulatum) is found in Ireland but not in Great Britain.

- Irish damselfly (Irish bluet) – Coenagrion lunulatum. The common name comes from the fact that it is found in Ireland but not in Britain.
- Azure damselfly (azure bluet) – Coenagrion puella
- Variable damselfly (variable bluet) – Coenagrion pulchellum
- Common blue damselfly (common bluet) – Enallagma cyathigerum
- Blue-tailed damselfly (common bluetip) – Ischnura elegans
- Scarce blue-tailed damselfly (small bluetip) – Ischnura pumilio
- Large red damselfly (spring redtail) – Pyrrhosoma nymphula

== Suborder Anisoptera (dragonflies) ==
=== Family Gomphidae (club-tailed dragonflies) ===
- Common clubtail (club-tailed dragonfly) – Gomphus vulgatissimus. No modern records.

=== Family Aeshnidae (hawkers and emperors) ===
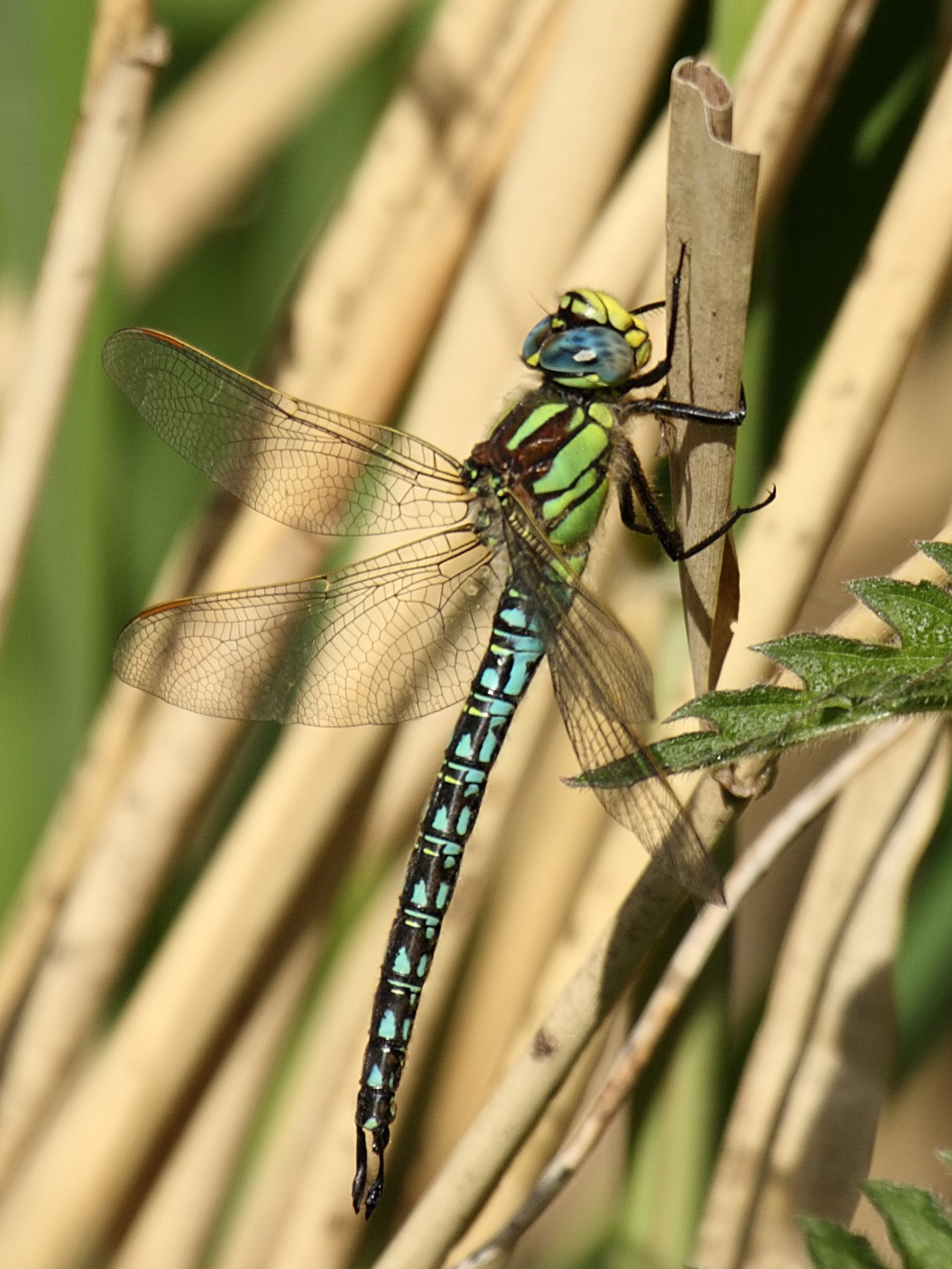
Hairy dragonfly (Brachytron pratense)

- Southern hawker – Aeshna cyanea. Vagrant.
- Brown hawker (amber-winged hawker) – Aeshna grandis
- Common hawker (moorland hawker) – Aeshna juncea
- Migrant hawker (autumn hawker) – Aeshna mixta. Recent colonist.
- Emperor (blue emperor) – Anax imperator. Recent colonist.
- Lesser emperor (yellow-ringed emperor) – Anax parthenope. Vagrant.
- Hairy dragonfly (spring hawker) – Brachytron pratense
- Vagrant emperor – Hemianax ephippiger. Vagrant.

=== Family Corduliidae (emerald dragonflies) ===
- Downy emerald – Cordulia aenea
- Northern emerald (moorland emerald) – Somatochlora arctica

=== Family Libellulidae (chasers, skimmers, and darters) ===
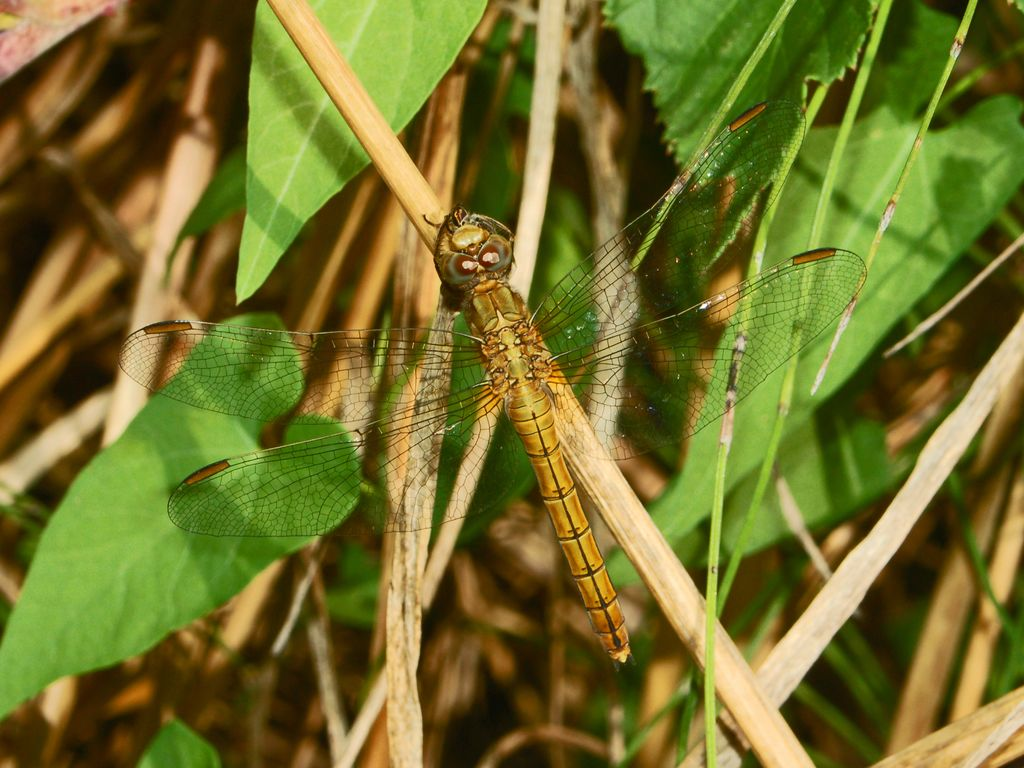
A female keeled skimmer (Orthetrum coerulescens). This species is common in wetlands, especially in Counties Galway, Kerry and Louth.

- Broad-bodied chaser – Libellula depressa. No modern records.
- Scarce chaser – Libellula fulva. No modern records.
- Four-spotted chaser – Libellula quadrimaculata
- Black-tailed skimmer – Orthetrum cancellatum
- Keeled skimmer (heathland skimmer) – Orthetrum coerulescens
- Black darter – Sympetrum danae
- Yellow-winged darter – Sympetrum flaveolum. Vagrant.
- Red-veined darter – Sympetrum fonscolombii. Status unknown.
- Ruddy darter – Sympetrum sanguineum
- Common darter – Sympetrum striolatum

== Discounted records ==
The following species have been included in previous lists of Irish dragonflies, but are no longer regarded as having been reliably recorded:

- Willow emerald damselfly
- Small red damselfly
- Red-eyed damselfly
- Golden-ringed dragonfly

== See also ==
- List of Odonata species of Great Britain
- Lt-Col. F. C. Fraser, 1956 Handbooks For The Identification of British Insects: Vol 1 Part 10. Odonata. Royal Entomological Society.online as pdf
