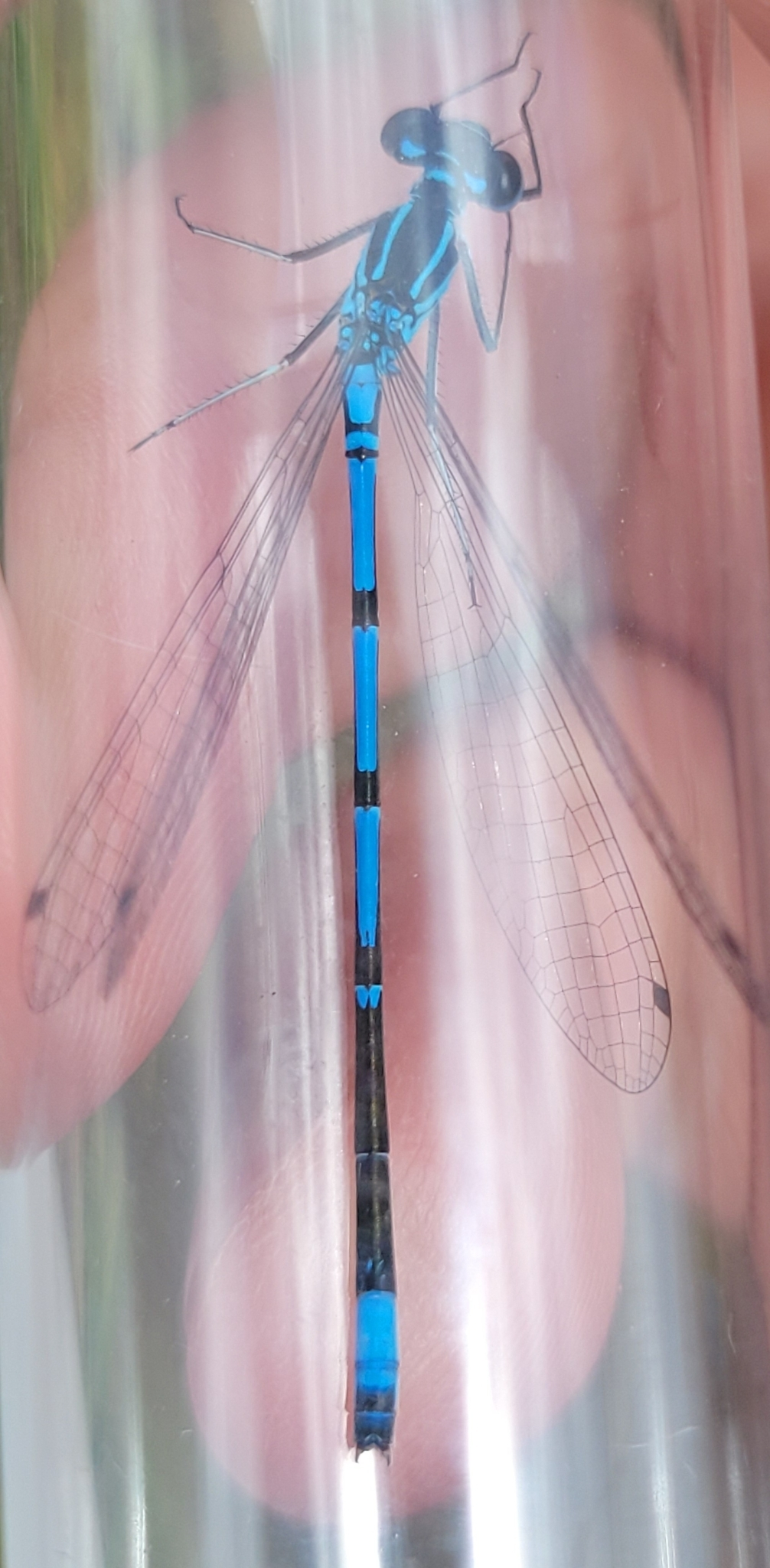

Conservation status
- Near Threatened (IUCN 3.1)

Scientific classification
- Kingdom: Animalia
- Phylum: Arthropoda
- Clade: Pancrustacea
- Class: Insecta
- Order: Odonata
- Suborder: Zygoptera
- Family: Coenagrionidae
- Genus: Coenagrion
- Species: C. syriacum

Binomial name
- Coenagrion syriacum (Morton, 1924)

= Coenagrion syriacum =

Species of damselfly

The Syrian bluet (Coenagrion syriacum) is a species of damselfly in the family Coenagrionidae. It is found in Israel, Lebanon, Syria, and Turkey. Its natural habitats are swamps, freshwater marshes, ponds, and canals and ditches. It is threatened by habitat loss.

== Description ==
The Syrian bluet is part of a group of three species of ‘eurasian bluets' that are quite similar to each other and differ in their geographical distribution: the European C. puella and the Cretan C. intermedium. All three are long, slender blue-black damselflies with dark pterostigmas, and the males have a characteristic pattern on the abdominal segments: S2 with a U-shape, segments S3–S5 showing black rings with elongated "spikes" on the sides of each segment extending almost to its base; and S6–S7 are mostly black. Females have black upper parts of the abdominal segments, and can appear either blue like the males (andromorph), or pinkish-beige with a bluish belly (gynomorph).
