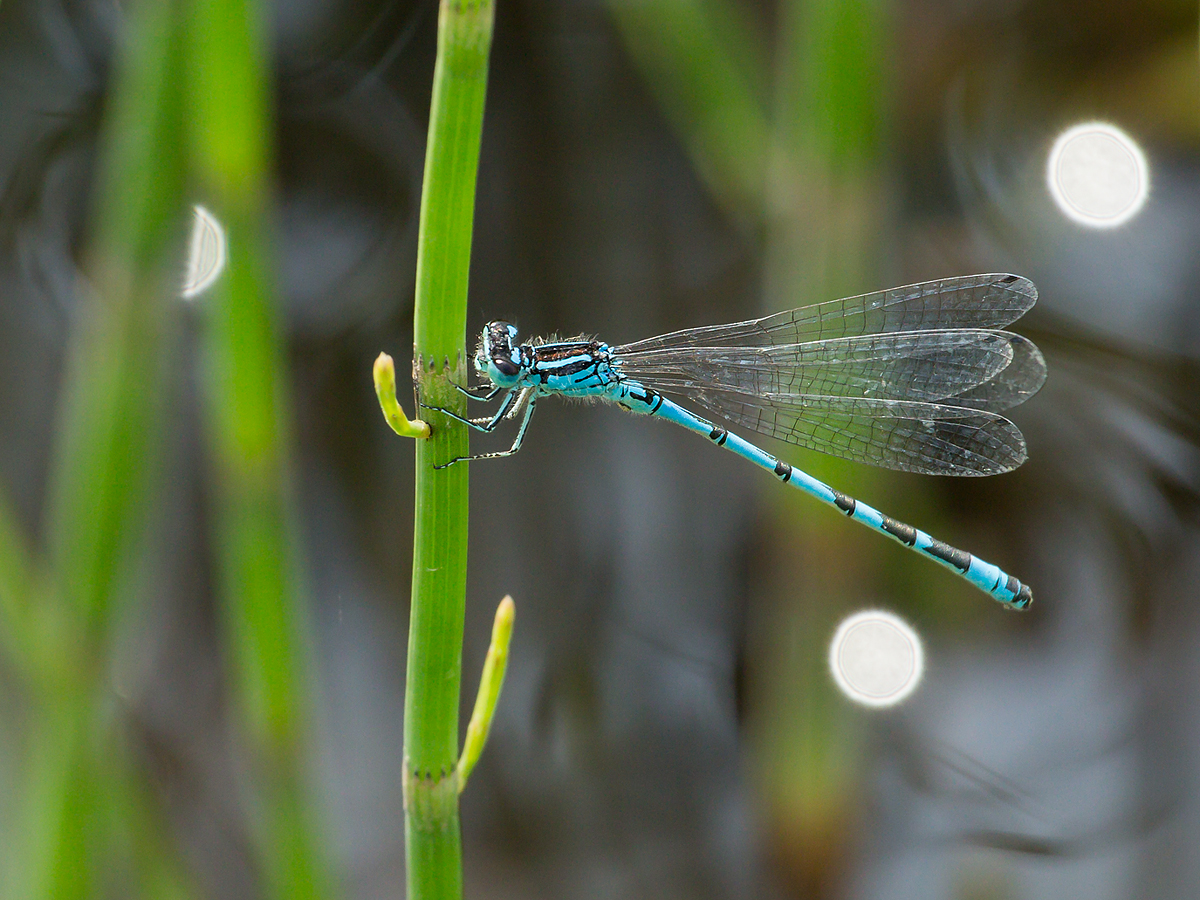
- Male
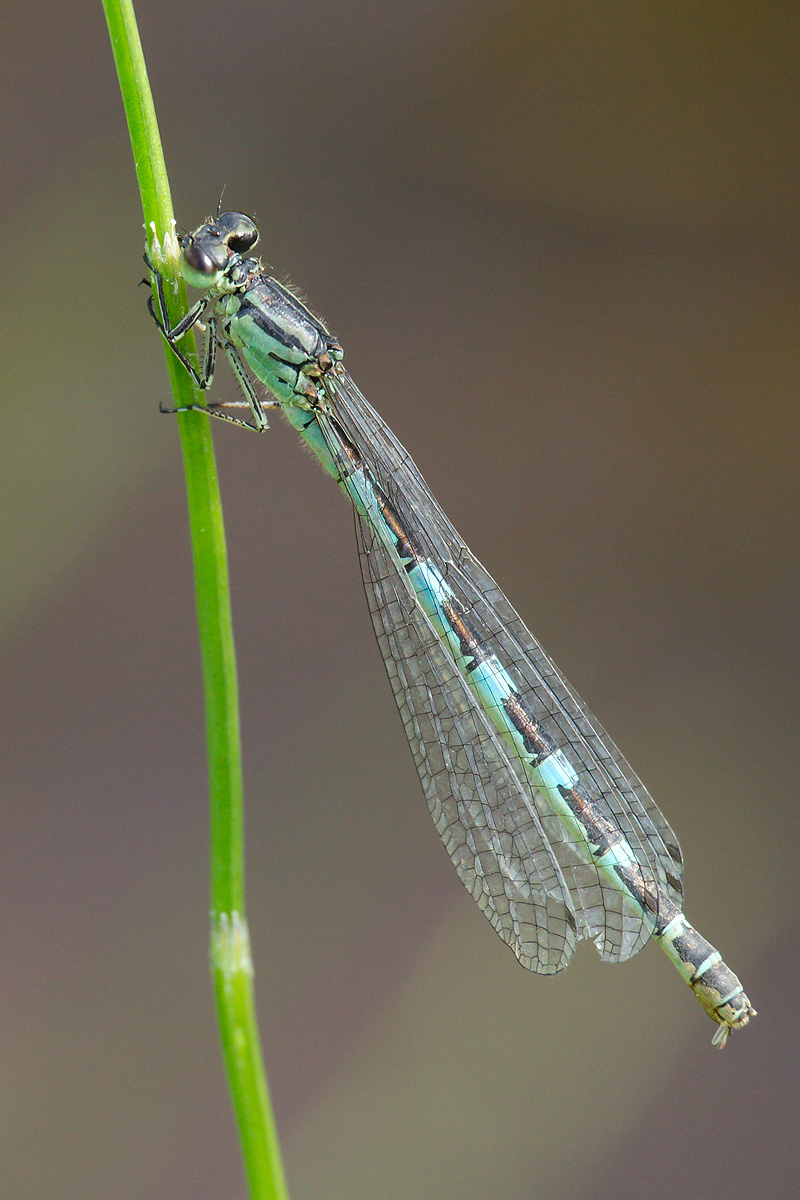
- Female

Conservation status
- Least Concern (IUCN 3.1)

Scientific classification
- Domain: Eukaryota
- Kingdom: Animalia
- Phylum: Arthropoda
- Class: Insecta
- Order: Odonata
- Suborder: Zygoptera
- Family: Coenagrionidae
- Genus: Coenagrion
- Species: C. ornatum

Binomial name
- Coenagrion ornatum (Sélys, 1850)

Synonyms
- Coenagrion vanbrinkae Lohmann, 1933

= Coenagrion ornatum =

Species of insect

Coenagrion ornatum, or, the ornate bluet, is a species of damselfly from the family Coenagrionidae distributed across a large part of Europe and Western Asia.

== Description ==
Adults reach 30 to 31 mm, of which 20–30 mm abdomen, while wingspan is 17–24 mm. The base coloration is blue with black markings, similar to other coenagrionids. Male can be distinguished by a marking on the top of the second segment of the abdomen (S2) which resembles a stalked wine glass or a trident, but is not always developed. Other segments up to S7 sport pointed markings resembling spears, while the eighth segment is entirely blue with at best two tiny black spots. Females have darker abdomens, but with always some blue on the proximal half of each segment; this characteristic resembles brighter azure damselfly females, which can be distinguished by three forward-pointing black spires (ornate bluet females only have the central one). Males in turn closely resemble the southern damselfly males, from which they can be distinguished by serrated hind edges of eye-sports on the top of the head and details in abdomen markings.

The period of activity is short: adults fly in the summer, from May to July or mid-August.

== Habitat and distribution ==
The species breeds in shallow, unshaded, slowly-flowing streams with moderate growth. It is absent from water bodies with densely overgrown banks. Most of the known localities in Europe are along ditches in agricultural areas where people regularly mow the banks and clean the bottoms.

The Balkans represent the central area of distribution, with but a few larger isolated populations to the west, specifically in Danube river valley in Bavaria, and in central France. Thus, it is regarded eastern counterpart of the southern damselfly. Ranges of the two species overlap in Central Europe. Ornate bluet is moderately common in the Balkans, even though the populations are relatively small. Water pollution is causing noticeable decline in other parts of Europe. Distribution range extends east across Anatolia and Iran to south-eastern Turkmenistan, where it inhabits higher altitudes, whereas lowlands are too dry for its survival. It is also absent from Mediterranean islands.
