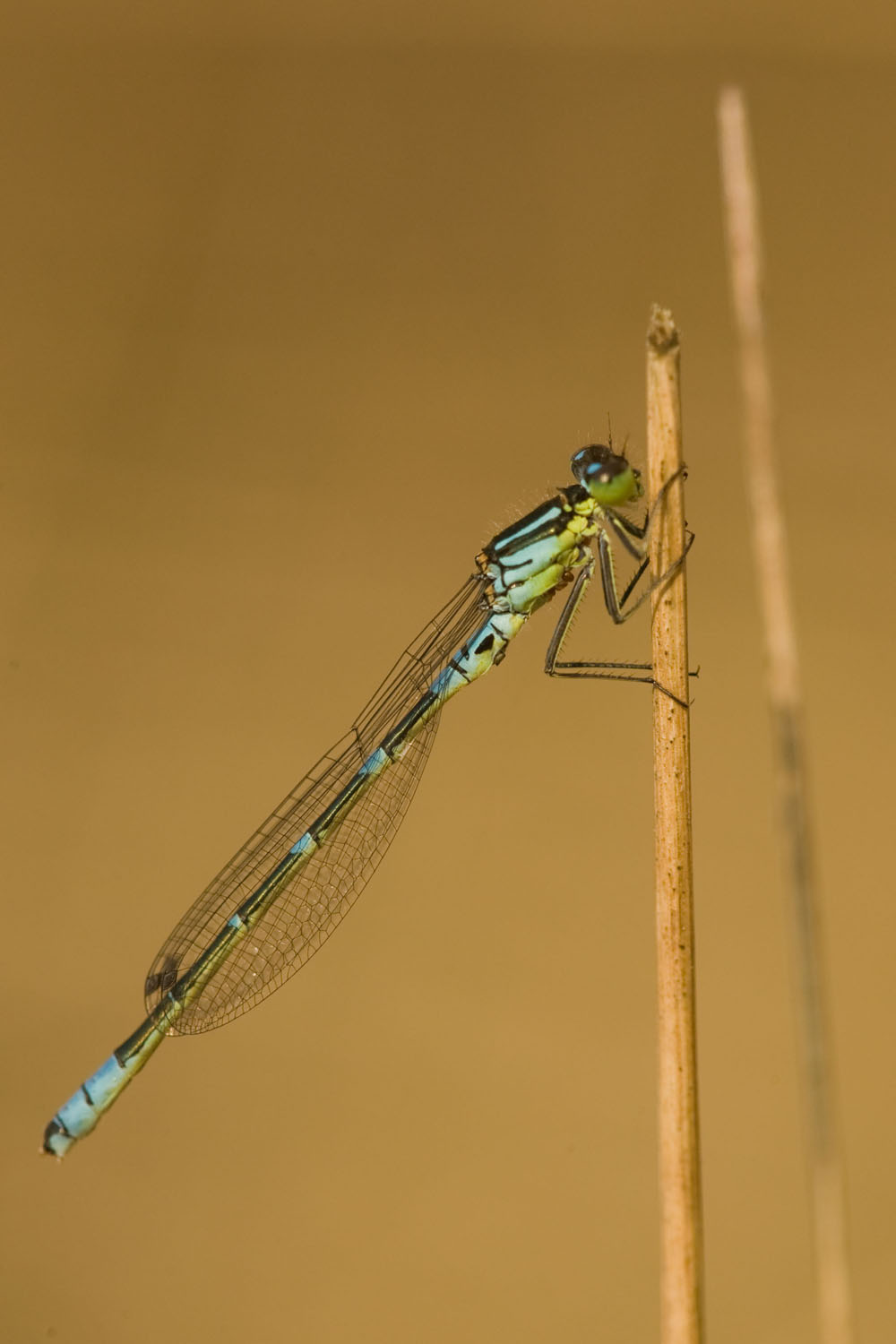

Conservation status
- Least Concern (IUCN 3.1)

Scientific classification
- Kingdom: Animalia
- Phylum: Arthropoda
- Class: Insecta
- Order: Odonata
- Suborder: Zygoptera
- Family: Coenagrionidae
- Genus: Coenagrion
- Species: C. lunulatum

Binomial name
- Coenagrion lunulatum (Charpentier, 1840)

= Irish damselfly =

Species of damselfly

The Irish damselfly or crescent bluet (Coenagrion lunulatum) is a damselfly found in northern Europe and Asia to north-eastern China;. It is common and widespread in northern Finland, scarce and local in the Netherlands and Ireland and rare elsewhere. The Irish damselfly name comes from the fact that it is found in Ireland but not in Great Britain. The alternative name, crescent bluet, refers to the shape of the markings on segment two of the male and its scientific name.

== Appearance ==
This species is similar to the azure damselfly (C. puella), the variable damselfly (C. pulchellum) and the common blue damselfly (Enallagma cyathigerum) with which it coexists. However, both the female and male are darker and shorter-bodied in comparison with other blue damselflies.

The species can be identified using the following features:

- In males the back of the abdomen is mostly black, whilst segments 8 and 9 are all blue.
- In males the underside is bright green especially on the head and thorax (see side view)
- The blue is of a darker shade than similar species
- Females are dull green with black markings
- In females the hind margin of the pronotum has a prominent raised point

== Status in Ireland ==
Coenagrion lunulatum is uncommon in Ireland and is confined to the midlands and north. It is listed as Vulnerable on the Red List of Irish dragonflies. Adults have been recorded from the beginning of May (County Tyrone on 1 May 2011) to late July. It is found on sheltered mesotrophic lakes and large pools, fens and cutover bogs.

It was first recorded in Ireland in County Sligo in 1981. The total number of sites known in Ireland at the beginning of 2013 was 94 in 16 counties. The range encompasses most of the northern half of the island. The northernmost site is in County Donegal at Lough Napaste north of Milford and the southern limit is on the eastern edge of the Burren in County Clare at Lough Skeardeen near Boston. The core of the range is in four counties: Fermanagh, Leitrim, Monaghan and Tyrone. These hold three-quarters of the recorded sites (71). The other counties have five or fewer known sites. One of the places it has been successfully recorded and photographed is Brackagh Moss, in County Armagh but it is probably extinct there.

Eutrophication is suggested as the most serious threat to the species.
