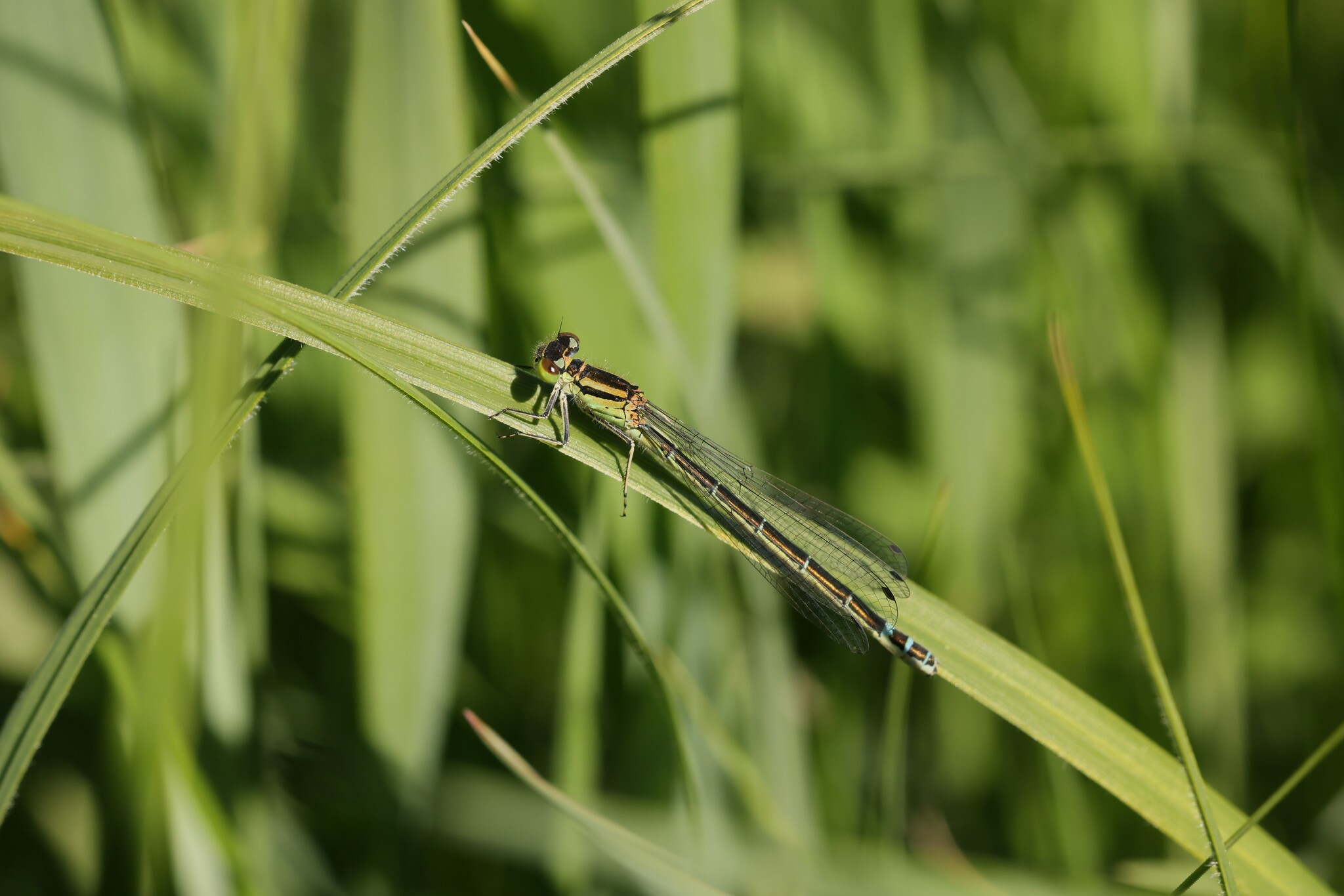

Conservation status
- Least Concern (IUCN 3.1)

Scientific classification
- Kingdom: Animalia
- Phylum: Arthropoda
- Class: Insecta
- Order: Odonata
- Suborder: Zygoptera
- Family: Coenagrionidae
- Genus: Coenagrion
- Species: C. angulatum

Binomial name
- Coenagrion angulatum Walker, 1912
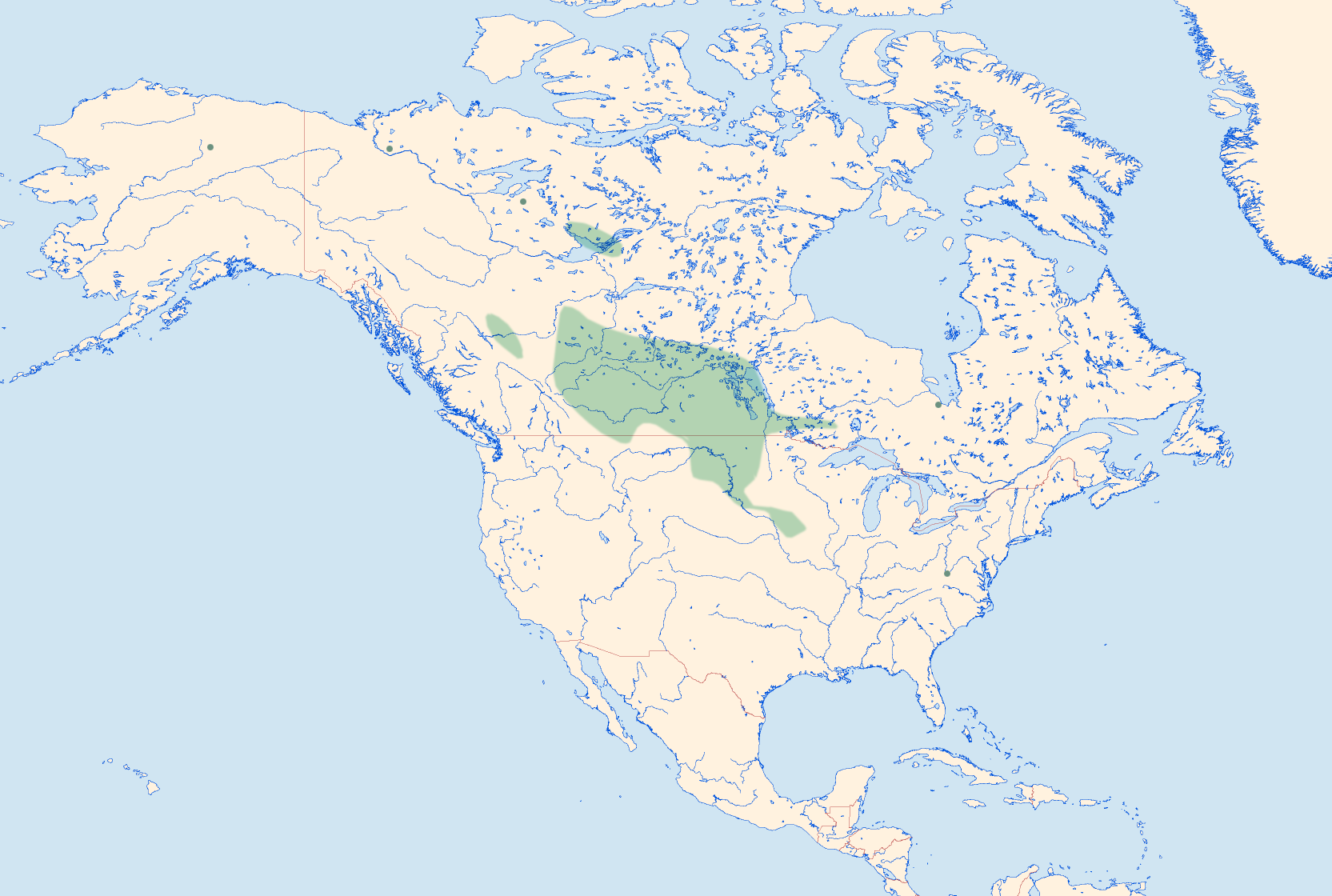
- Distribution of Coenagrion angulatum in North America

= Coenagrion angulatum =

Species of damselfly

Coenagrion angulatum, the prairie bluet, is a species of narrow-winged damselfly in the family Coenagrionidae. It is found in North America.

The IUCN conservation status of Coenagrion angulatum is "LC", least concern, with no immediate threat to the species' survival. The population is stable. The IUCN status was reviewed in 2017.
