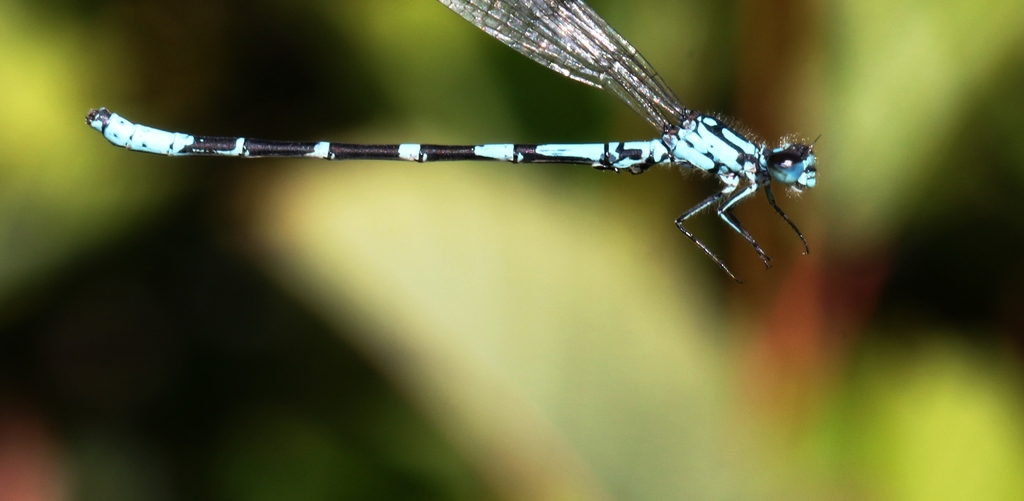

Scientific classification
- Kingdom: Animalia
- Phylum: Arthropoda
- Class: Insecta
- Order: Odonata
- Suborder: Zygoptera
- Family: Coenagrionidae
- Genus: Coenagrion
- Species: C. interrogatum

Binomial name
- Coenagrion interrogatum (Sélys, 1876)

= Coenagrion interrogatum =

Species of damselfly

Coenagrion interrogatum, the Subarctic bluet, is a blue and black, pond damselfly of the family Coenagrionidae. The species was first described by Edmond de Sélys Longchamps in 1876.

== Distribution ==
According to the University of Alberta E.H. Strickland Entomological Museum:

Most northerly range of the Eurasian bluets with records in Alaska, Yukon, Northwest Territories, throughout most of Canada and east to Newfoundland. Found in some northerly states towards the east and much of New England.
