= Coenagrion persicum =

Conservation status
- Data Deficient (IUCN 3.1)

Scientific classification
- Kingdom: Animalia
- Phylum: Arthropoda
- Class: Insecta
- Order: Odonata
- Suborder: Zygoptera
- Family: Coenagrionidae
- Genus: Coenagrion
- Species: C. persicum

Binomial name
- Coenagrion persicum Lohmann, 1993

Species of damselfly

Coenagrion persicum is a species of damselfly in the family Coenagrionidae. It is found in Iran, possibly Iraq, and possibly Turkey.
