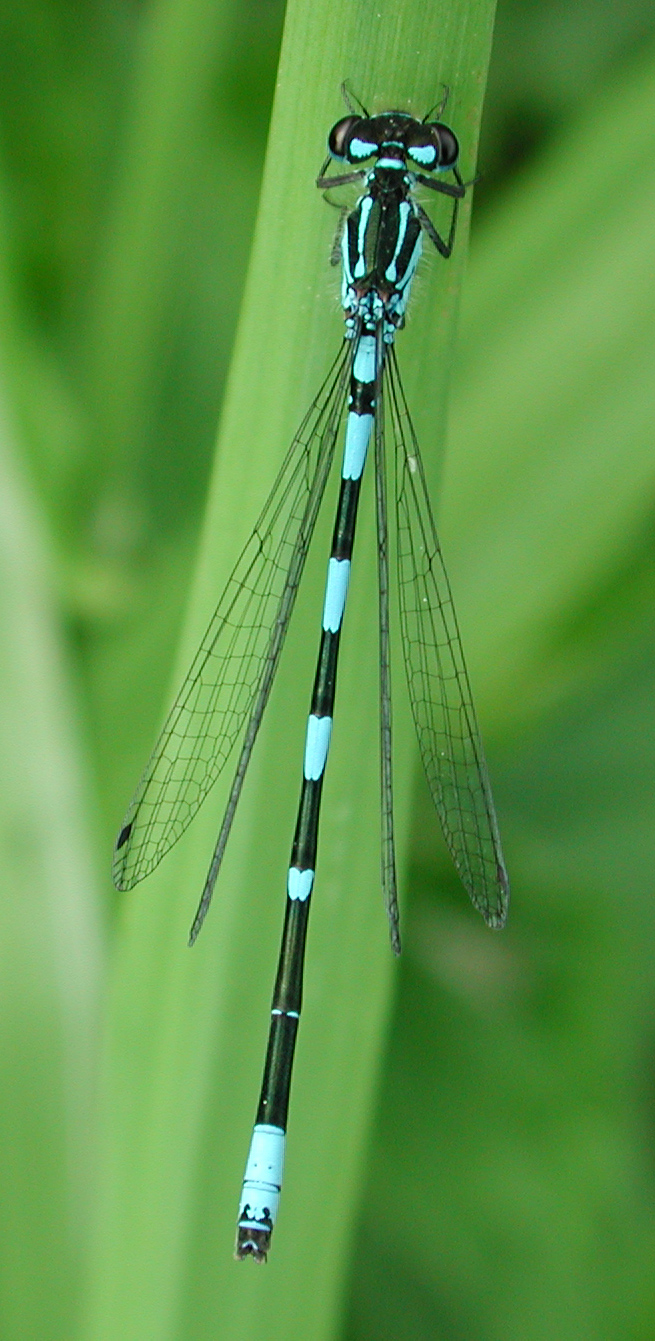
- Coenagrion pulchellum

Scientific classification
- Kingdom: Animalia
- Phylum: Arthropoda
- Clade: Pancrustacea
- Class: Insecta
- Order: Odonata
- Suborder: Zygoptera
- Family: Coenagrionidae
- Genus: Coenagrion; Kirby, 1890

= Coenagrion =

Genus of damselflies

Coenagrion is a genus of damselflies in the family Coenagrionidae. Species of Coenagrion occur throughout the Holarctic, including Europe, Asia and North America. They are commonly known as the Eurasian bluets, although several species also occur in North America.

Members of Coenagrion are small to medium-sized damselflies, typically blue and black in colour, and are often associated with ponds, lakes and slow-moving freshwater habitats. The genus includes some of the most widespread and familiar damselflies of the Northern Hemisphere, including Coenagrion puella, Coenagrion pulchellum and Coenagrion hastulatum.

== Description ==
Species of Coenagrion are slender damselflies with narrow wings held closed over the abdomen when at rest. Males are typically bright blue with black markings, while females may be blue, green, brown or pink depending on the species and colour form. Most species inhabit still or slow-flowing freshwater environments, where the larvae develop among submerged vegetation.

== Taxonomic history ==
The genus Coenagrion was established by Kirby in 1890 as part of his revision of the damselflies formerly included in the broadly defined genus Agrion. In the same work Kirby recognised the subfamily Coenagrioninae, from which the family name Coenagrionidae is derived.

Coenagrion remains the type genus of Coenagrionidae and is one of the principal genera of the family.

== Species ==
The following species are currently placed in Coenagrion:

- Coenagrion aculeatum Yu & Bu, 2007
- Coenagrion angulatum Walker, 1912 – Prairie Bluet
- Coenagrion armatum (Charpentier, 1840) – Norfolk Damselfly or Dark Bluet
- Coenagrion australocaspicum Dumont & Heidari, 1996
- Coenagrion caerulescens (Fonscolombe, 1838) – Mediterranean Bluet
- Coenagrion castellani Roberts, 1948
- Coenagrion daponshanensis (Zhou & Zhou, 2007)
- Coenagrion ecornutum (Selys in Selys & McLachlan, 1872)
- Coenagrion exclamationis (Fraser, 1919)
- Coenagrion glaciale (Hagen in Selys & McLachlan, 1872)
- Coenagrion hastulatum (Charpentier, 1825) – Northern Damselfly, Spearhead Bluet
- Coenagrion holdereri (Förster, 1900)
- Coenagrion hylas (Trybom, 1889) – Siberian Bluet
- Coenagrion intermedium Lohmann, 1990 – Cretan Bluet
- Coenagrion interrogatum (Selys, 1876) – Subarctic Bluet
- Coenagrion johanssoni (Wallengren, 1894) – Arctic Bluet
- Coenagrion lanceolatum (Selys in Selys & McLachlan, 1872)
- Coenagrion lunulatum (Charpentier, 1840) – Irish Damselfly,
- Coenagrion melanoproctum (Selys, 1876) (doubtful species)
- Coenagrion mercuriale (Charpentier, 1840) – Southern Damselfly, Mercury Bluet
- Coenagrion ornatum (Selys, 1850) – Ornate Bluet
- Coenagrion persicum Lohmann, 1993
- Coenagrion ponticum (Bartenev, 1929)
- Coenagrion puella (Linnaeus, 1758) – Azure Damselfly
- Coenagrion pulchellum (Vander Linden, 1825) – Variable Damselfly
- Coenagrion resolutum (Selys, 1876) – Taiga Bluet
- Coenagrion scitulum (Rambur, 1842) – Dainty Damselfly, Dainty Bluet
- Coenagrion syriacum (Morton, 1924) – Syrian Bluet
- Coenagrion terue (Asahina, 1949)

== Biology ==
=== Thermal adaptation ===
This genus's capacity for phenotypically plastic responses to the surface air temperature is important to species' ranges. These thermal responses will also decide a great deal of these species' responses to climate change. Nilsson-Örtman et al., 2012 find a high degree of thermal adaptation in high latitude populations of Coenagrion. They found similar plasticity even for various sympatric species at the same locations, and despite the highly variable weather at such latitudes.

== Etymology ==
The genus name Coenagrion combines the Greek κοινός (koinos, "common") with Agrion, the name of a related genus.
