= Cretan bluet =

Conservation status
- Endangered (IUCN 3.1)

Scientific classification
- Kingdom: Animalia
- Phylum: Arthropoda
- Clade: Pancrustacea
- Class: Insecta
- Order: Odonata
- Suborder: Zygoptera
- Family: Coenagrionidae
- Genus: Coenagrion
- Species: C. intermedium

Binomial name
- Coenagrion intermedium Lohmann, 1990

Synonyms
- Coenagrion ponticum intermedium

Species of damselfly

The Cretan bluet (Coenagrion intermedium) is a damselfly in the family Coenagrionidae. It used to be a subspecies of Coenagrion ponticum

== Size ==
- Length: 35 – 36 mm
- Length of abdomen: 26 – 32 mm
- Hindwing: 19 – 24 mm

== Description ==
The Cretan bluet is a typical Coenagrion species. Males have a vibrant blue-and-black colouration. Females come in two colour forms, either sharing the male's same blue-and-black colouration, or being different, typically brown to olive-coloured, and therefore easily distinguishable from the male. The dorsal part of the female's abdomen is largely black with a small blue-green area on the anterior part of each segment. No females in their restricted are all brown to olive-color. Female bluets are easily distinguishable from the males, which are predominantly blue with black areas.

== Distribution ==
The Cretan bluet is endemic to the Greek island of Crete.

== Habitat ==
This species is found in or around rivers, where larvae have been collected from between floating tree roots.

== Biology ==
The larval period of the Cretan bluet is thought to last around one year or less, by extrapolation of what occurs in the closest related species from the Mediterranean area. The flight period of Coenagrion intermedium is from the late April to mid-August. Adult bluets feed on small flying insects. Male damselflies are unlikely to defend their territories. Oviposition with the female is done in tandem with the male. Female bluets will lay their eggs in floating herbs, small roots along the river edge and rotten wood in the water, using their ovipositor to cut a slit in the substrate.

== Threats ==
This species is widespread and abundant in its restricted area, but its likely to become vulnerable in the near future due to water use, global warming and dryness.
