= Coenagrion australocaspicum =

Conservation status
- Data Deficient (IUCN 3.1)

Scientific classification
- Kingdom: Animalia
- Phylum: Arthropoda
- Class: Insecta
- Order: Odonata
- Suborder: Zygoptera
- Family: Coenagrionidae
- Genus: Coenagrion
- Species: C. australocaspicum

Binomial name
- Coenagrion australocaspicum Dumont & Heidari, 1995

Species of damselfly

Coenagrion australocaspicum is a species of damselfly in the family Coenagrionidae. It is found in Azerbaijan and Iran. Its natural habitats are rivers, swamps, and freshwater marshes. It is threatened by habitat loss.
