= Coenagrion ponticum =

Conservation status
- Least Concern (IUCN 3.1)

Scientific classification
- Kingdom: Animalia
- Phylum: Arthropoda
- Class: Insecta
- Order: Odonata
- Suborder: Zygoptera
- Family: Coenagrionidae
- Genus: Coenagrion
- Species: C. ponticum

Binomial name
- Coenagrion ponticum Bartenef, 1929

Species of damselfly

Coenagrion ponticum is a species of damselfly in the family Coenagrionidae. It is found in Azerbaijan, Georgia, and Turkey. Its natural habitats are rivers, freshwater lakes, and freshwater marshes. It is threatened by habitat loss.
