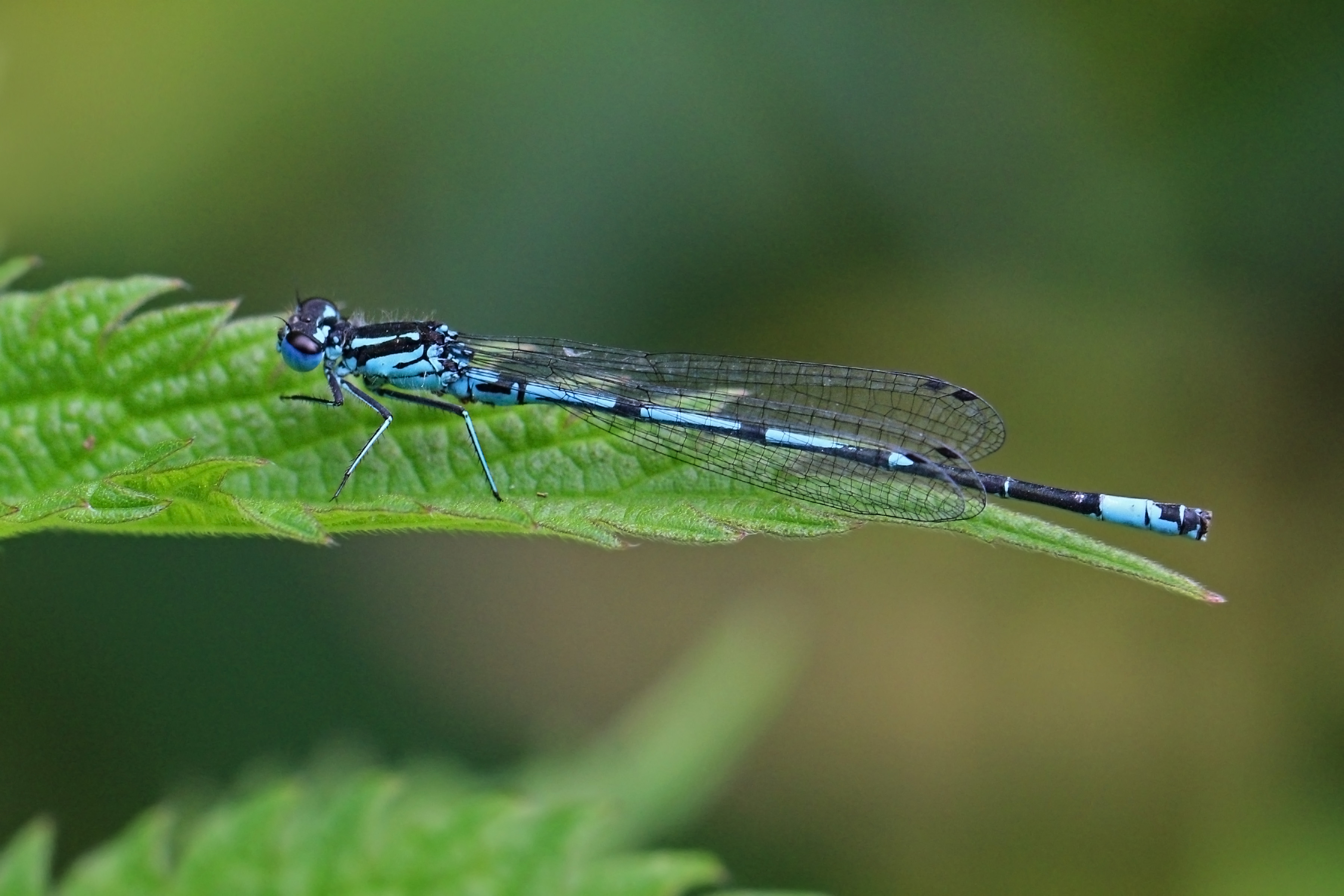
- Male, shoulder stripe just broken, UK
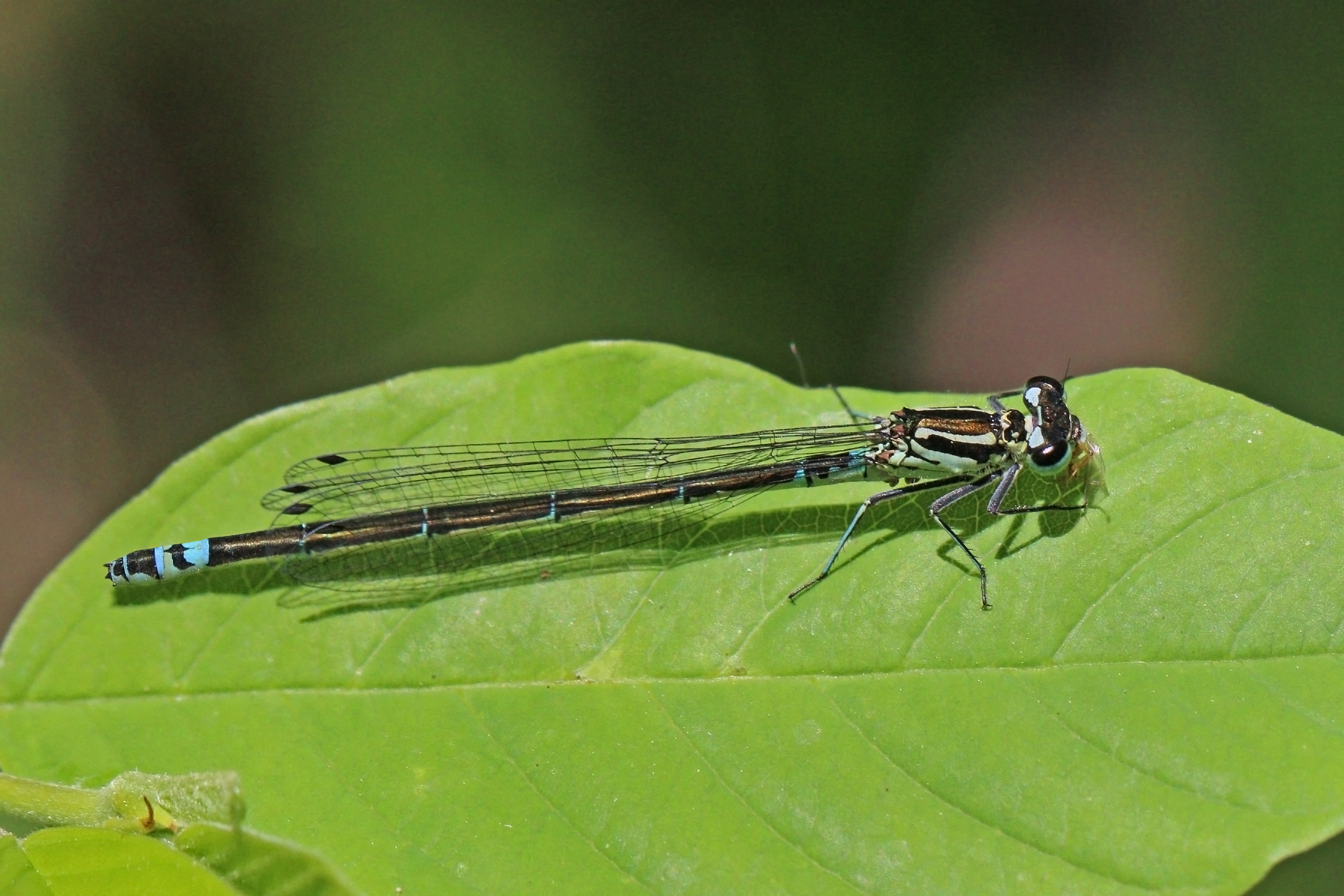
- Female, dark form, Estonia

Scientific classification
- Kingdom: Animalia
- Phylum: Arthropoda
- Clade: Pancrustacea
- Class: Insecta
- Order: Odonata
- Suborder: Zygoptera
- Family: Coenagrionidae
- Genus: Coenagrion
- Species: C. pulchellum

Binomial name
- Coenagrion pulchellum (Vander Linden, 1825)

= Variable damselfly =

Species of damselfly

The variable damselfly or variable bluet (Coenagrion pulchellum) is a European damselfly. Despite its name, it is not the only blue damselfly prone to variable patterning.

Its behaviour is much like that of the azure damselfly; it usually stays close to vegetation. Immatures are often found in adjacent meadows or uncut grassy areas.

== Description ==
The male variable damselfly has a distinctive "wine glass" marking on the second segment of the abdomen. This is a black U-shaped mark with a black line joining the segment's narrow terminal black band. (This distinguishes it from the azure damselfly which has the U-shape but no line connecting it to the terminal band.)

Male forms

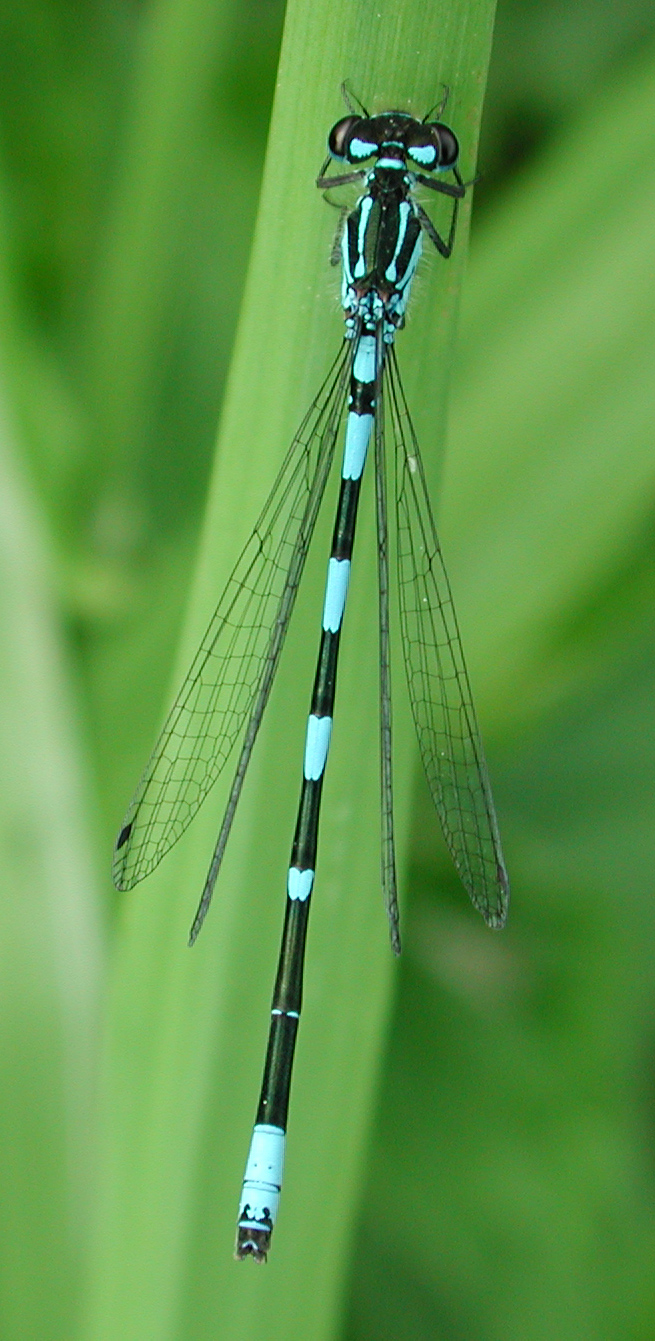
Male
S9 virtually unmarked

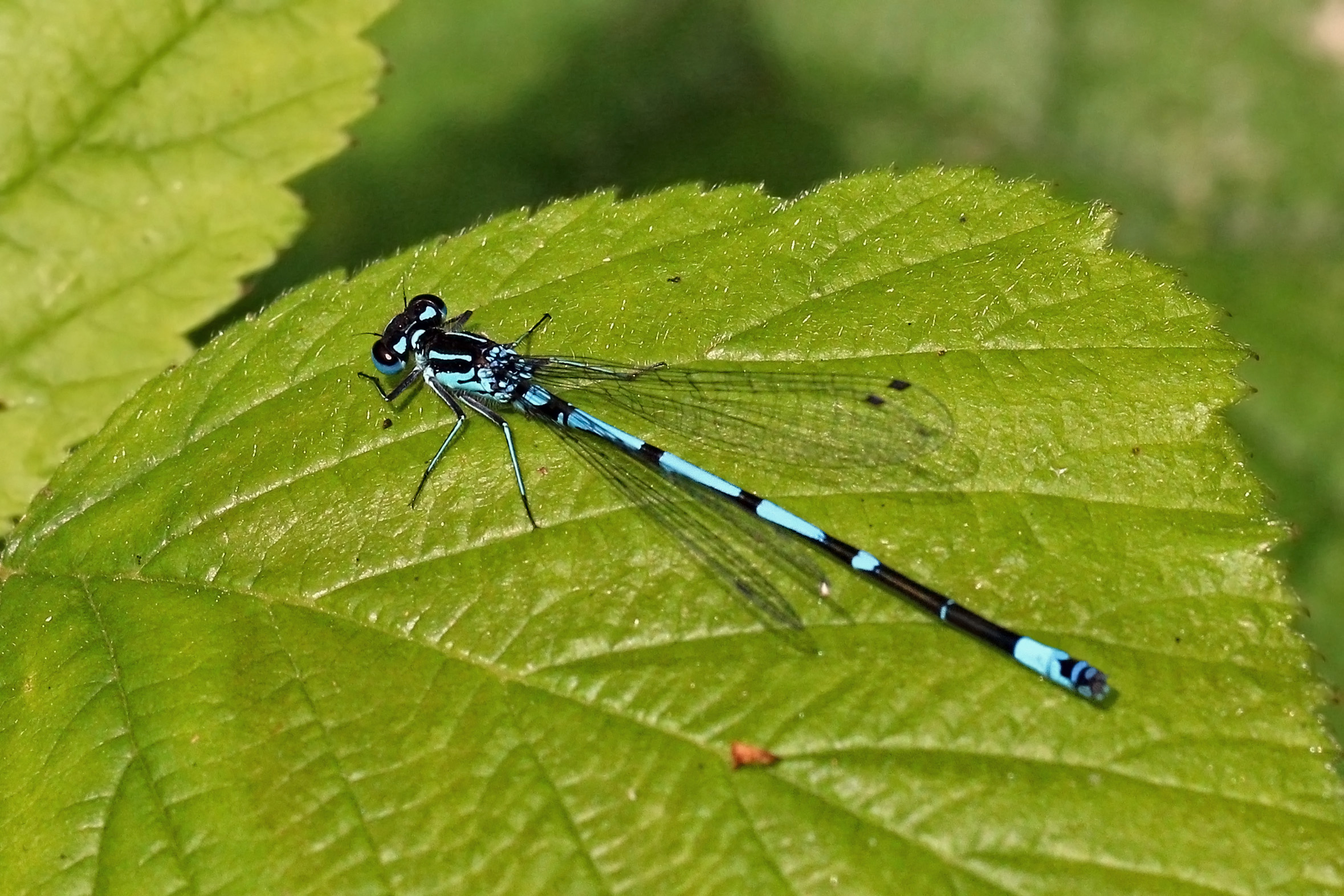
Male, shoulder stripe unbroken

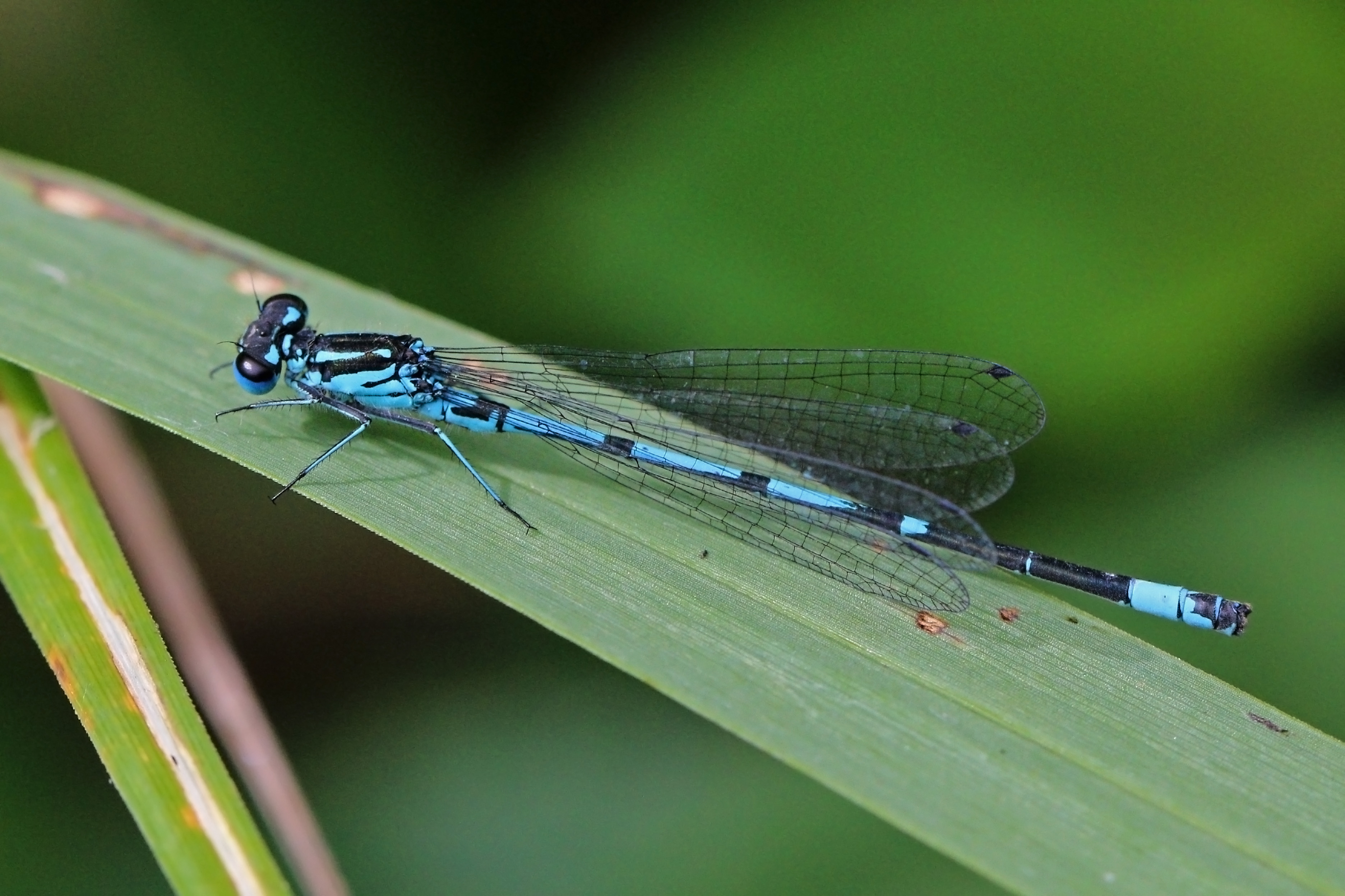
Male, shoulder stripe broken

Male, dark variant

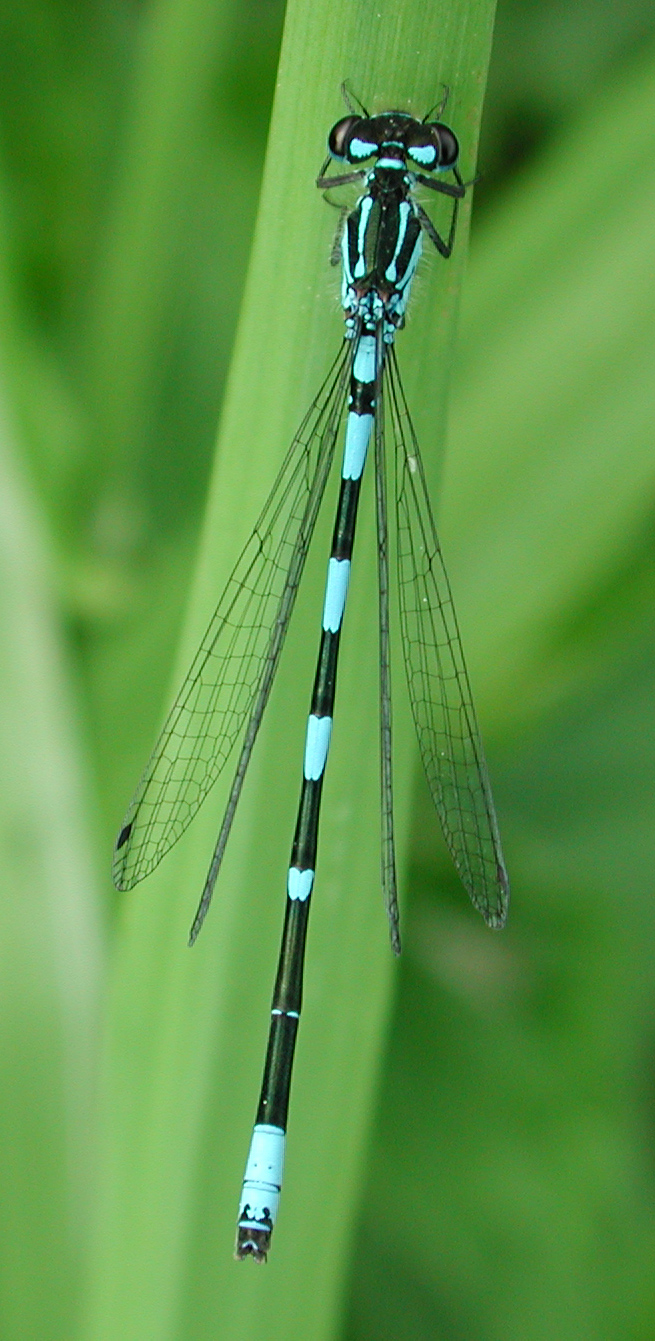
Male
S9 virtually unmarked
Female forms

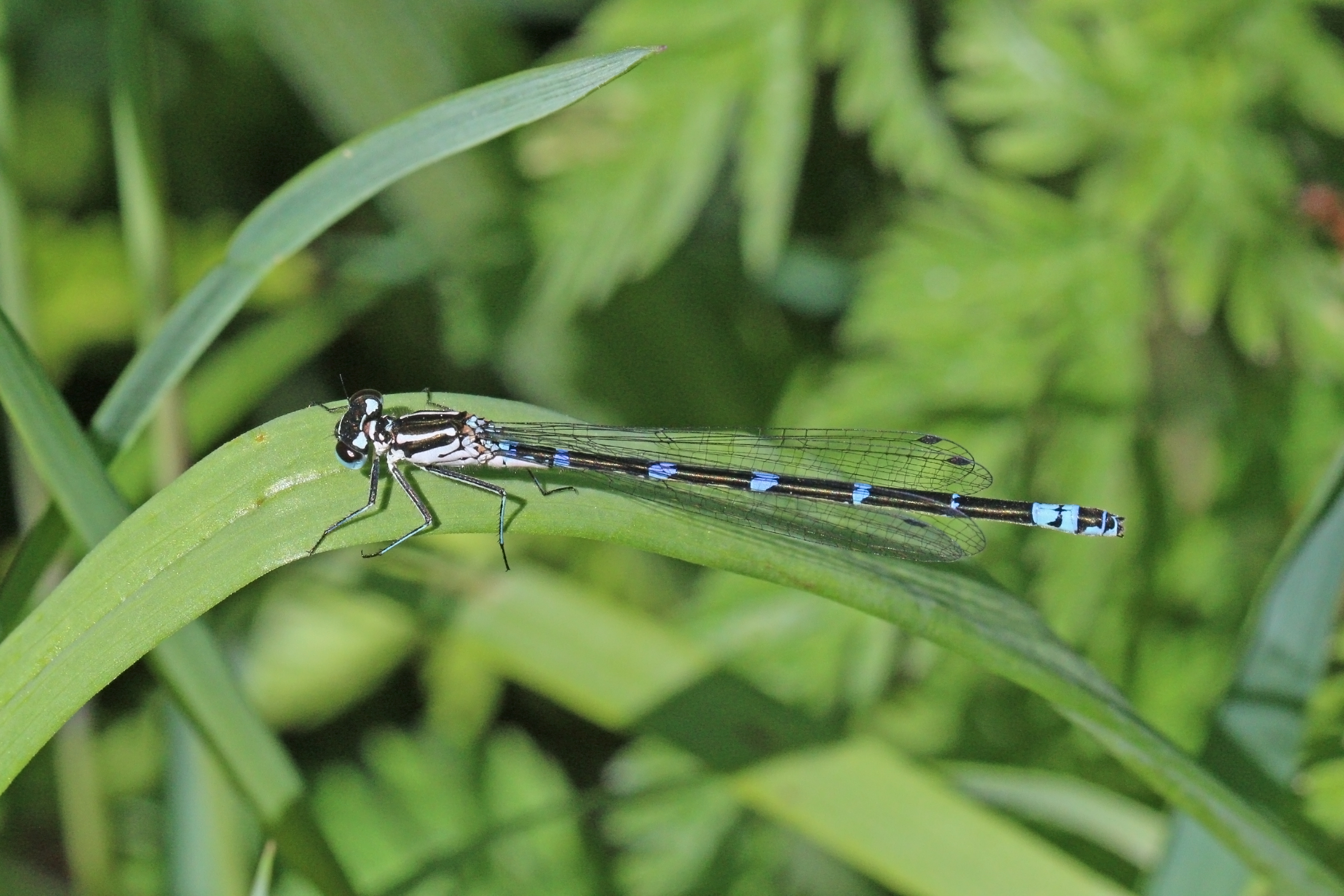
immature female, blue form

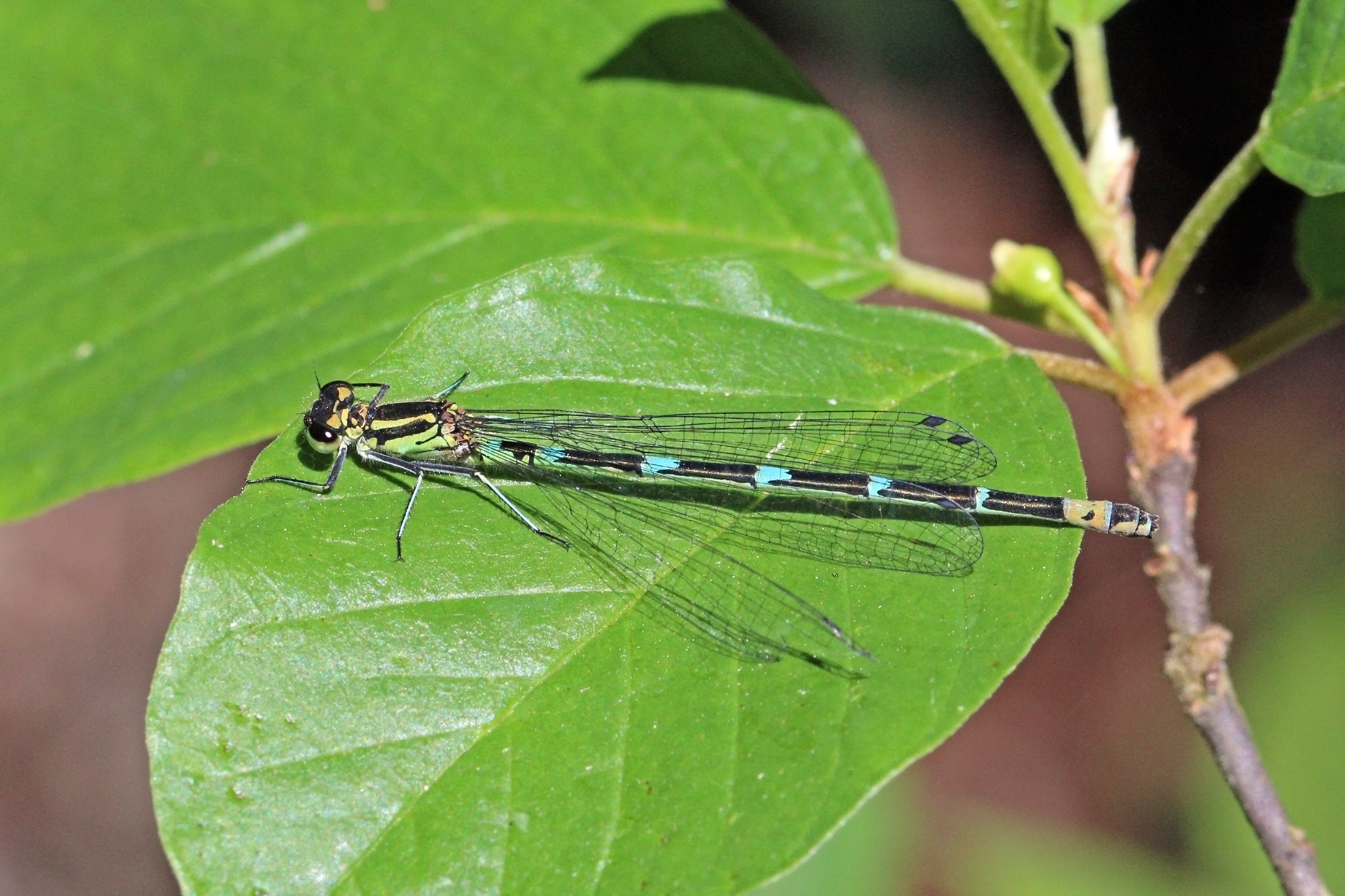
young adult female blue form

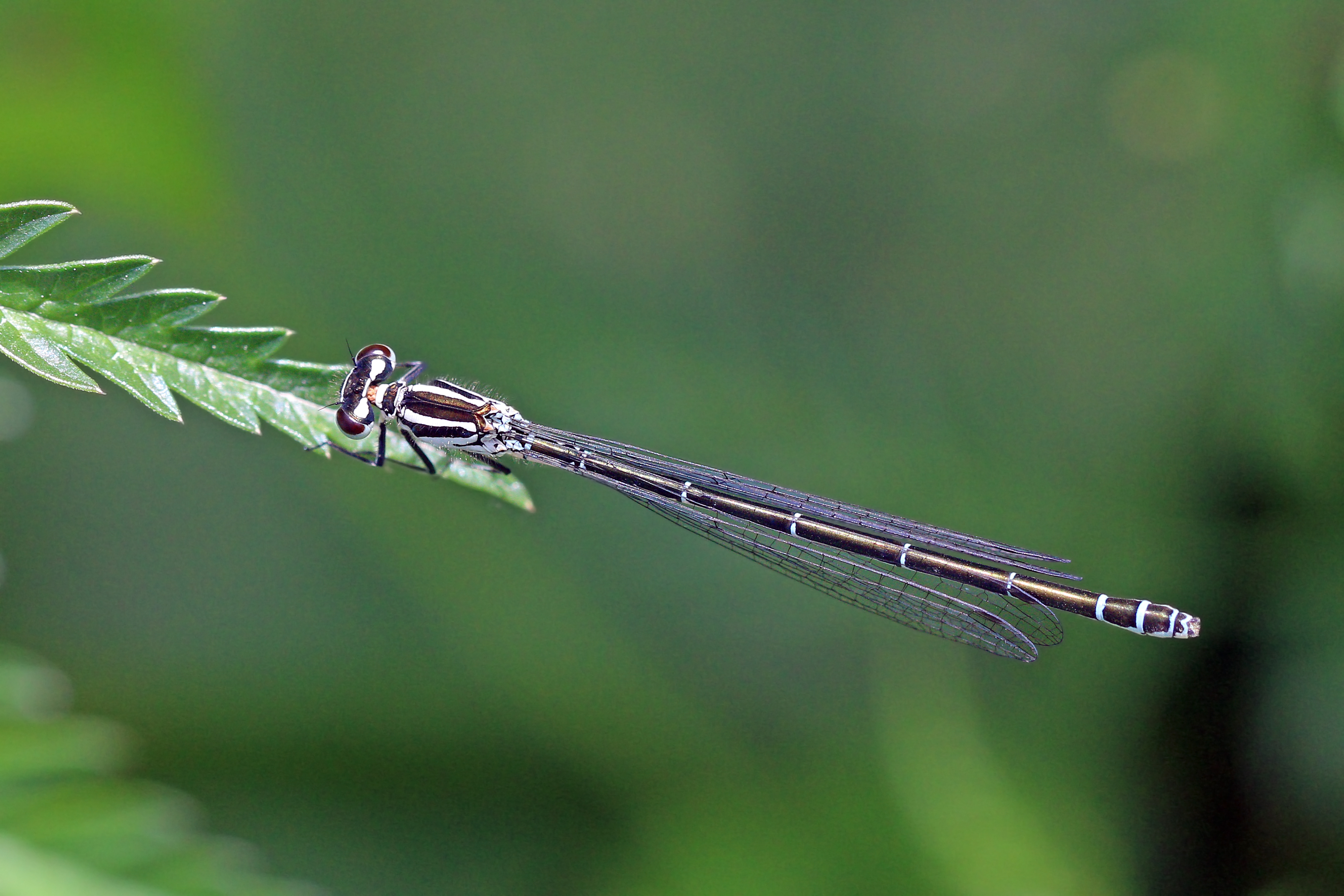
adult female, dark form
Mating

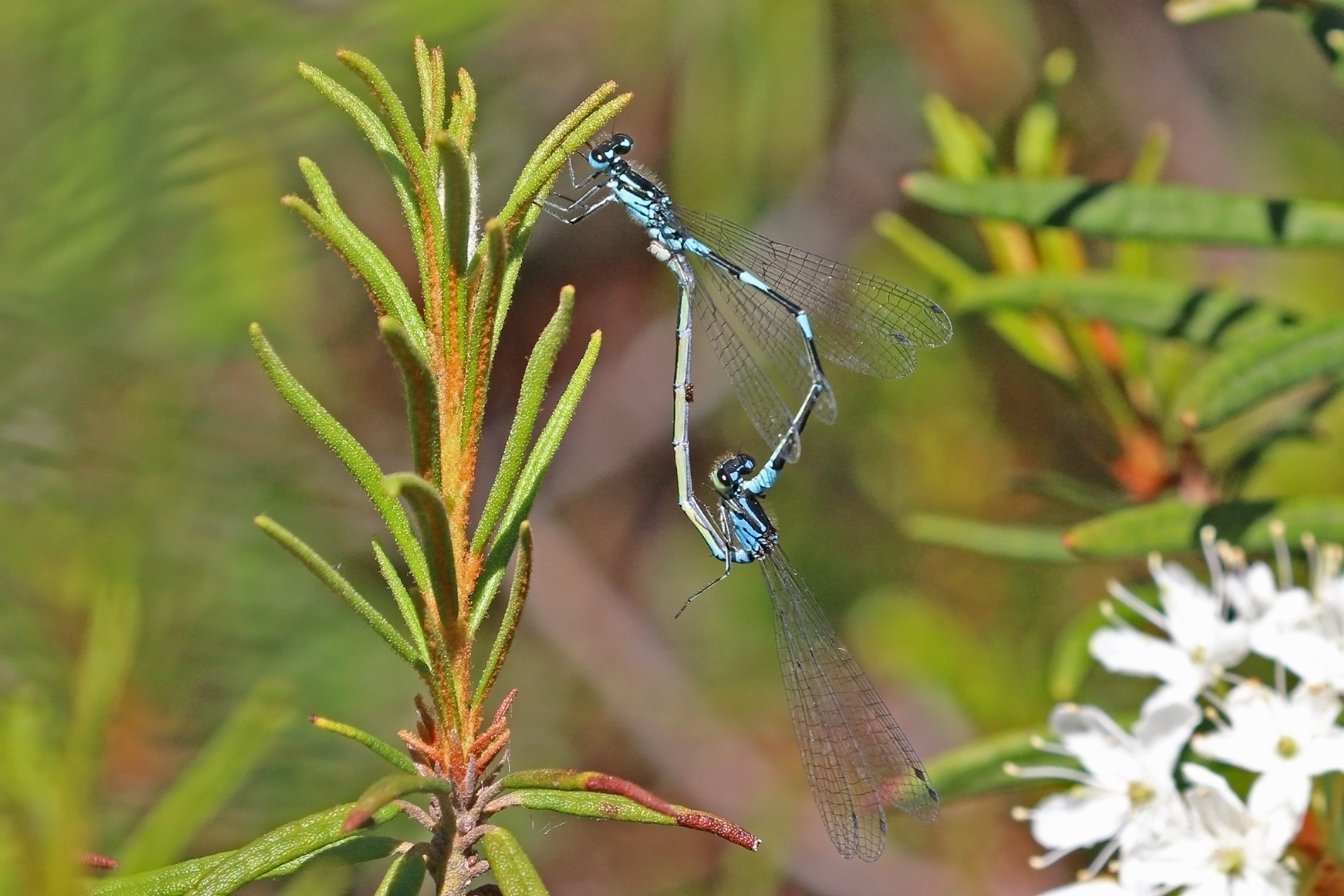
mating, with female blue form

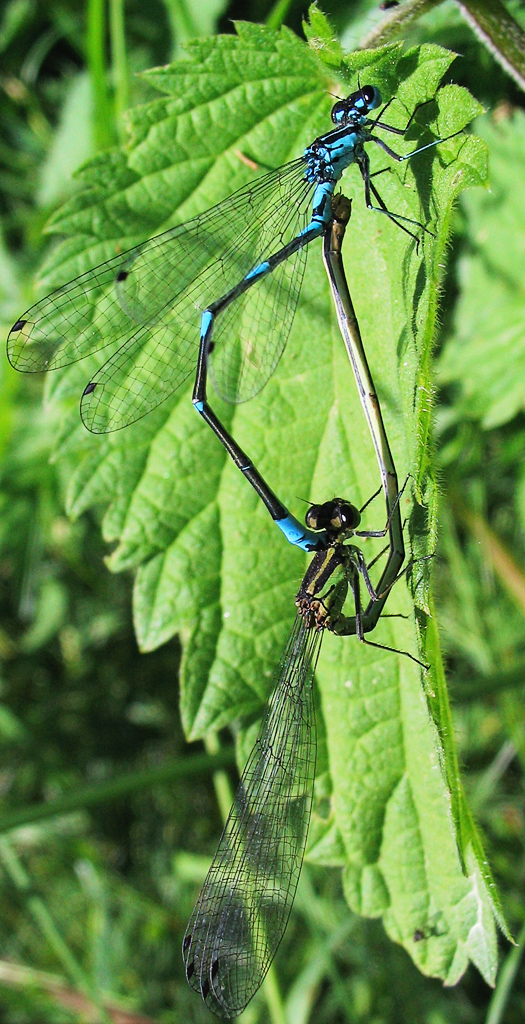
mating, with young adult female blue form

== Distribution ==
The variable damselfly occurs throughout Europe. Scattered and uncommon in mainland Britain but widespread and common in Ireland.
