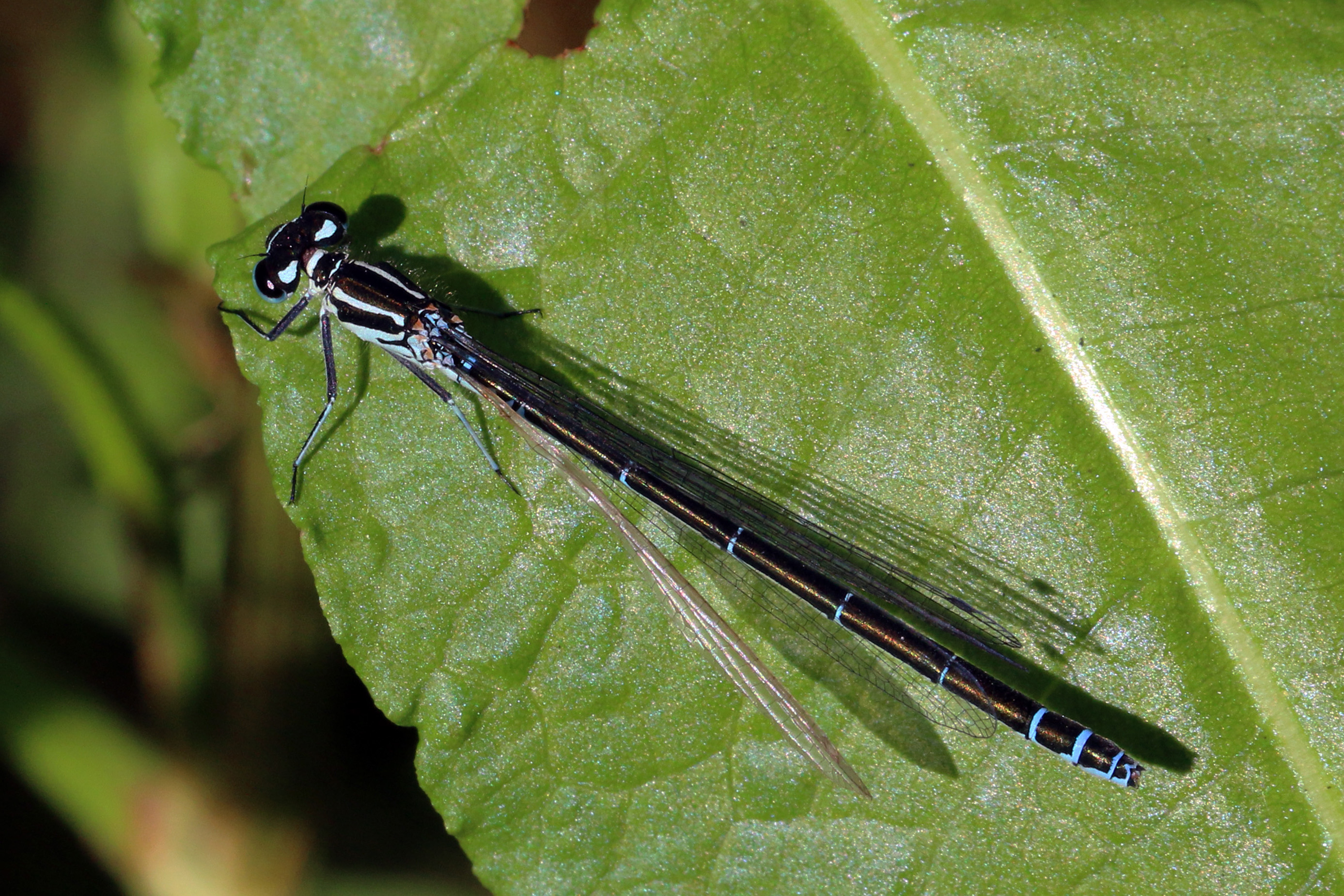
- female (blue phase)

Scientific classification
- Kingdom: Animalia
- Phylum: Arthropoda
- Clade: Pancrustacea
- Class: Insecta
- Order: Odonata
- Suborder: Zygoptera
- Family: Coenagrionidae
- Genus: Coenagrion
- Species: C. puella

Binomial name
- Coenagrion puella (Linnaeus, 1758)

= Azure damselfly =

- male

Species of damselfly

The azure damselfly (Coenagrion puella) is a species of damselfly found in most of Europe. It is notable for its distinctive black and blue colouring. They are commonly found around ponds and lakesides during the summer.

== Morphology ==
=== Adults ===
==== Males ====
Adult male azure damselflies have a head and thorax patterned with blue and black. They have an azure blue abdomen patterned with black markings. The marking on the second segment of the abdomen is U-shaped, separated from the segment's narrow terminal black band; this distinguishes it from the variable damselfly Coenagrion pulchellum where the U-shape is joined to the terminal band with a black line.

Segments three to five are blue with broader black terminal bands, lacking the forward-pointing projection the upper surface which adult male common blue damselfly has. Segment six has a similar pattern but with more restricted blue and a broader area of black, and segment seven is mostly black, with just a narrow blue area at the base. Segment eight and much of segment nine are sky-blue, forming a noticeable contrasting patch, but there are small dark markings on the rear upper side of segment nine, which adult male common blue damselfly does not possess.

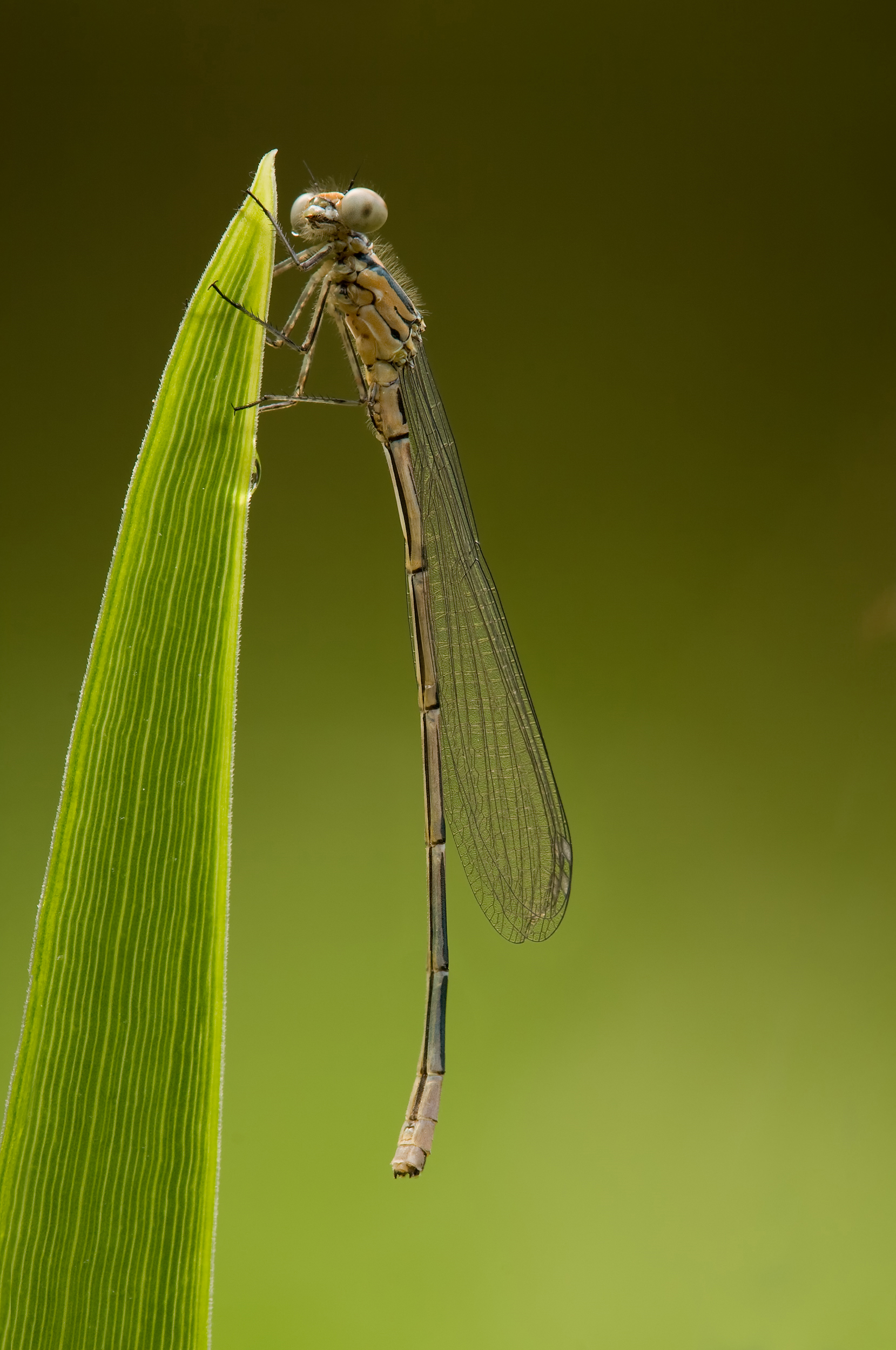
immature

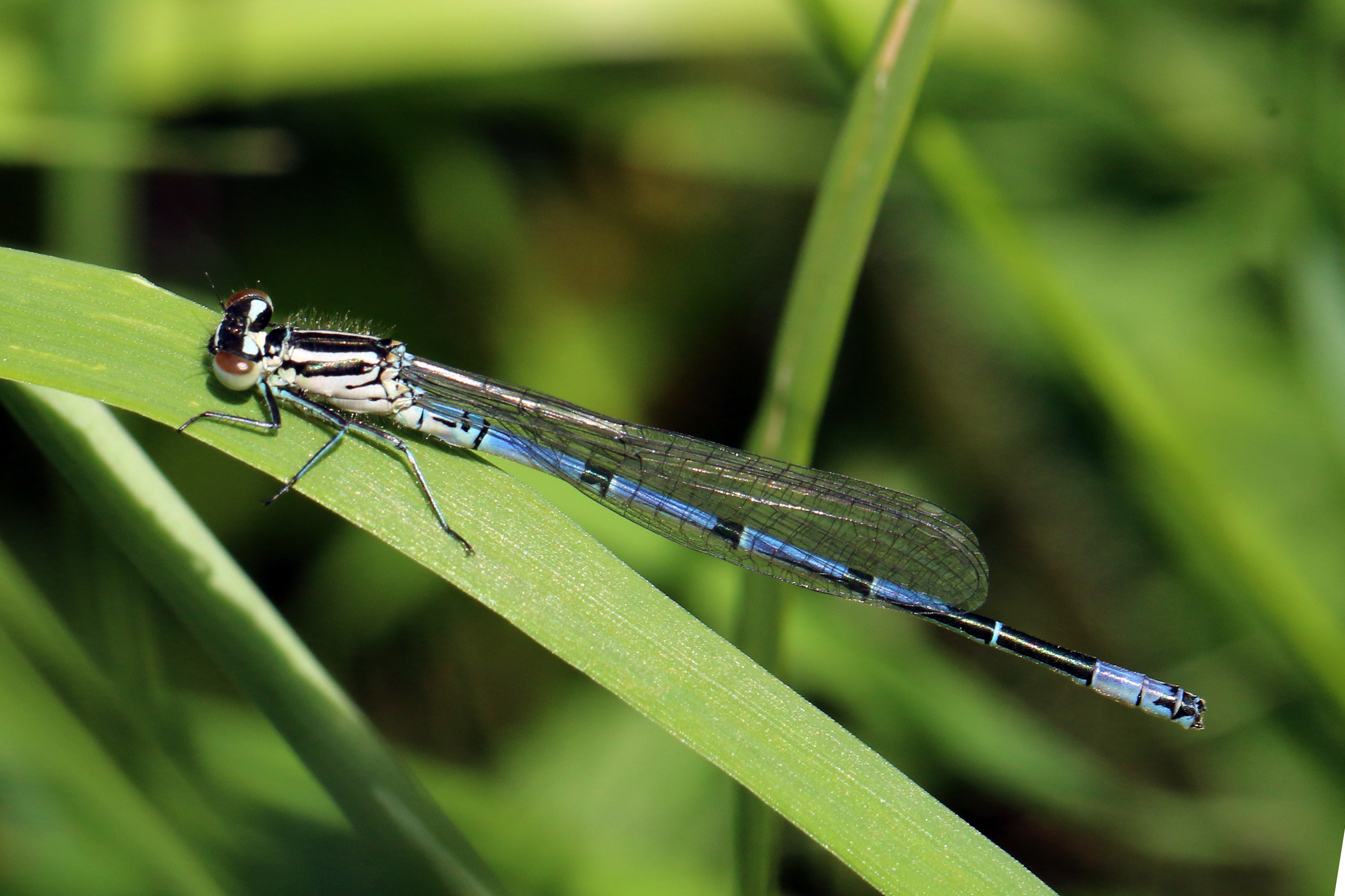
juvenile

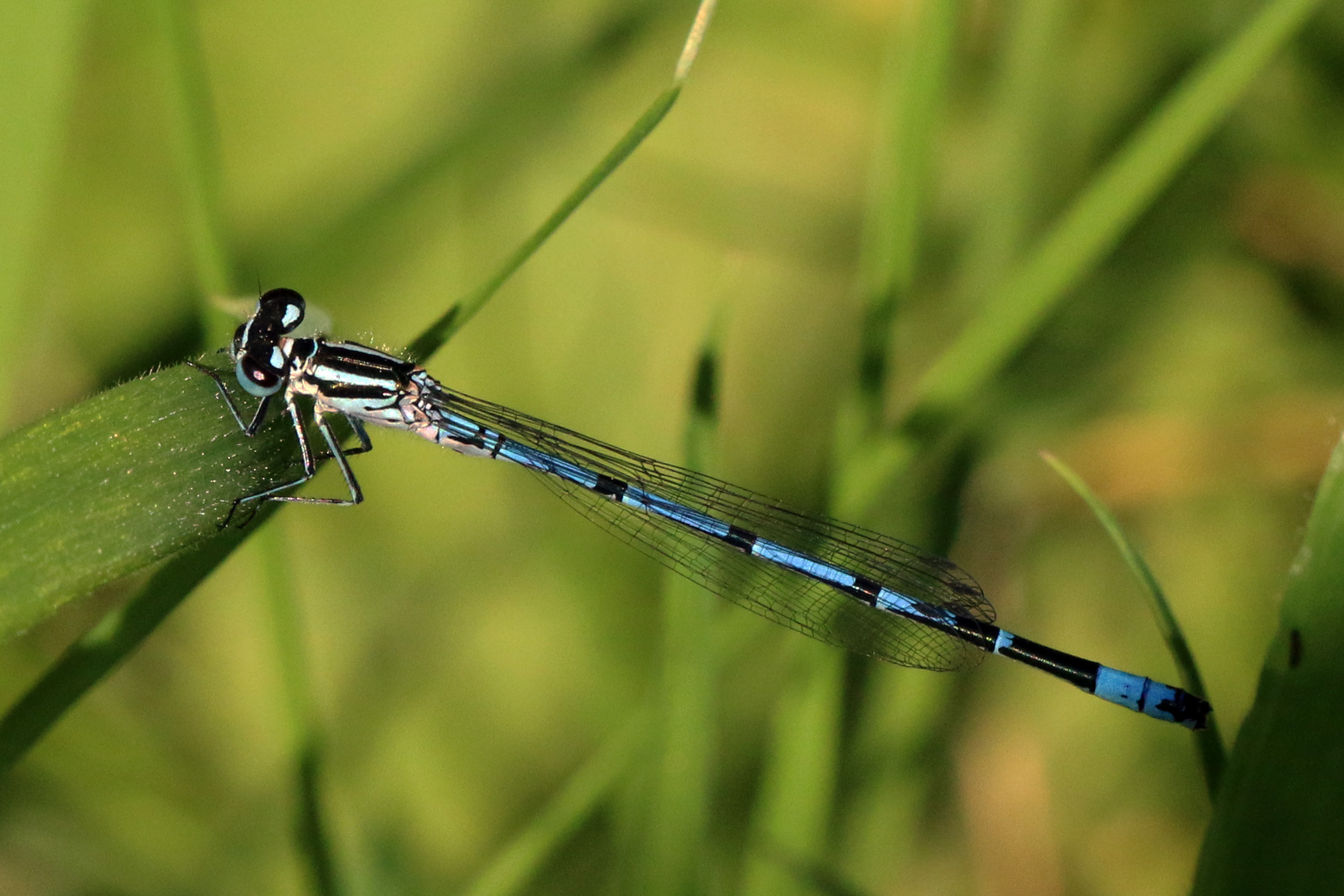
young adult male

==== Females ====
Adult female azure damselflies have a head and thorax pattern similar to that of the male, but with glittering, glossy green replacing the blue colouring. The abdominal segments are largely black in colouring, with narrow pale markings at the junction between each segment.

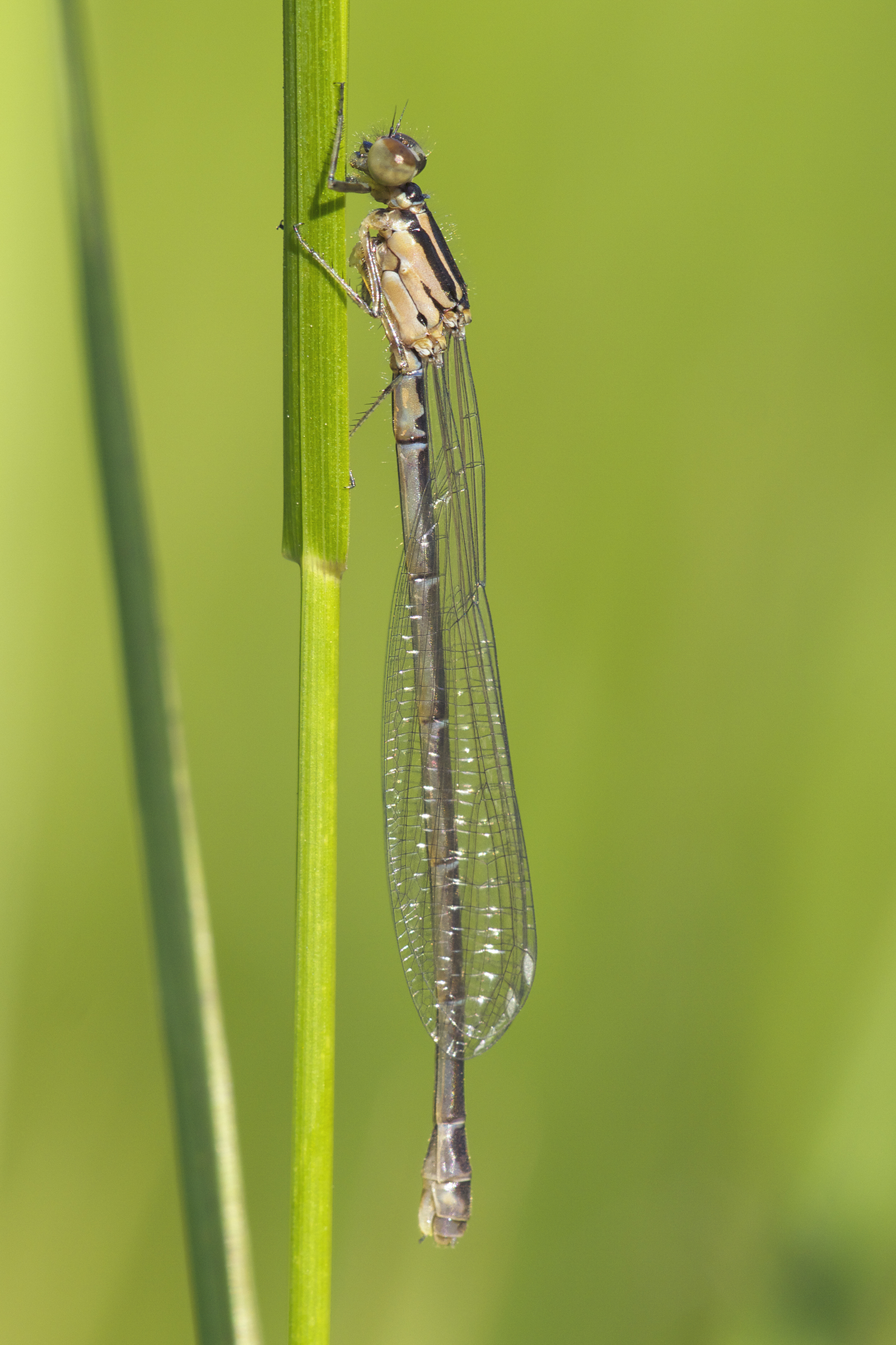
female newly emerged

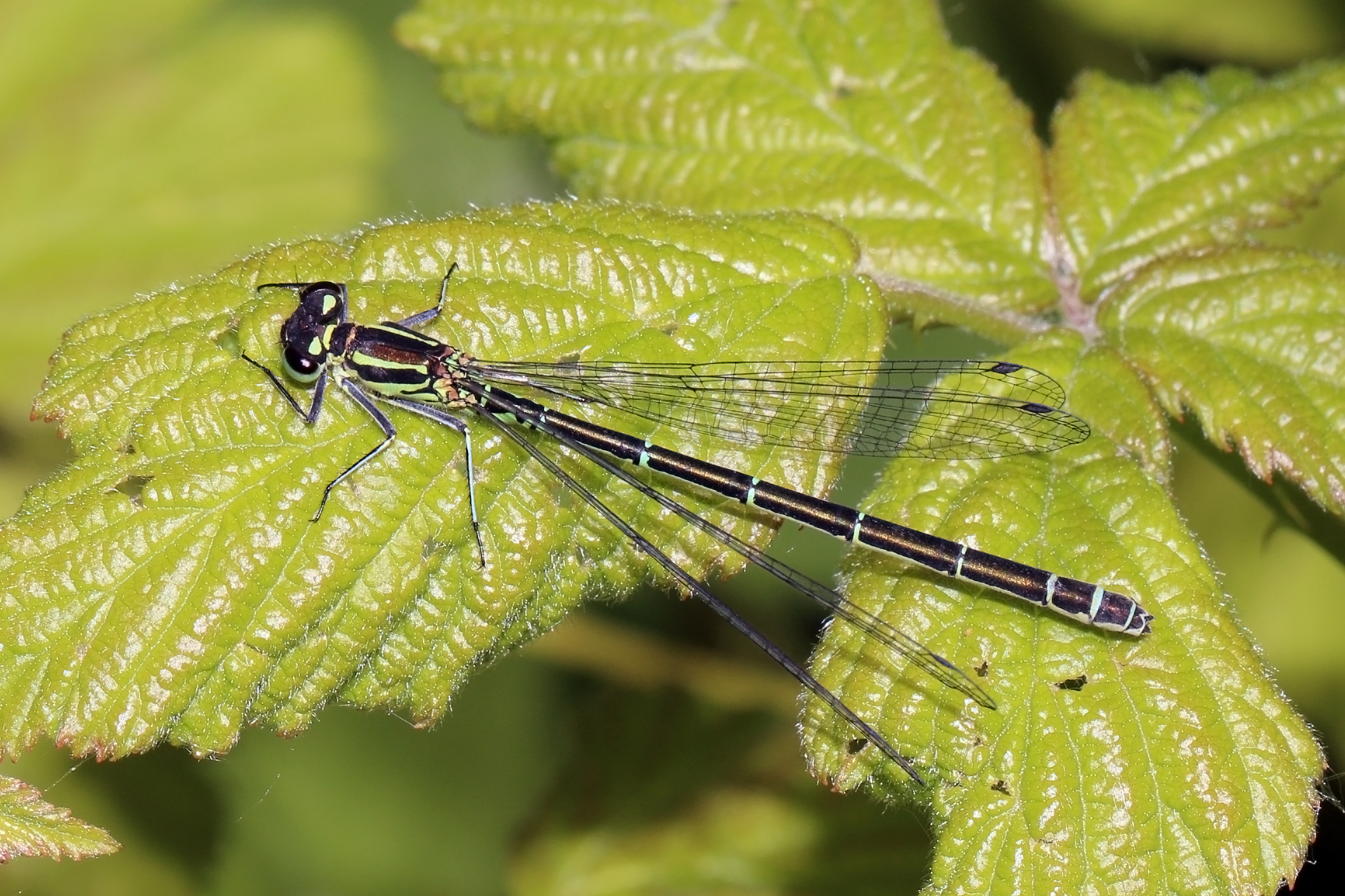
female, green form

=== Nymphs ===
The nymphs are usually green with browner wing buds and lamellae. They develop in one year (two in the north), feeding among submerged vegetation and on small invertebrates.

== Behaviour ==
Mature adults are seen frequently mating and laying eggs. It usually stays close to the vegetation around the pond or lake and flies from May to September.

This common damselfly looks very like a common blue damselfly. The behaviour is also different - unlike common blues, they rarely fly out over large stretches of water. They are not normally as common around August and September, June and July being the peak of their populations.

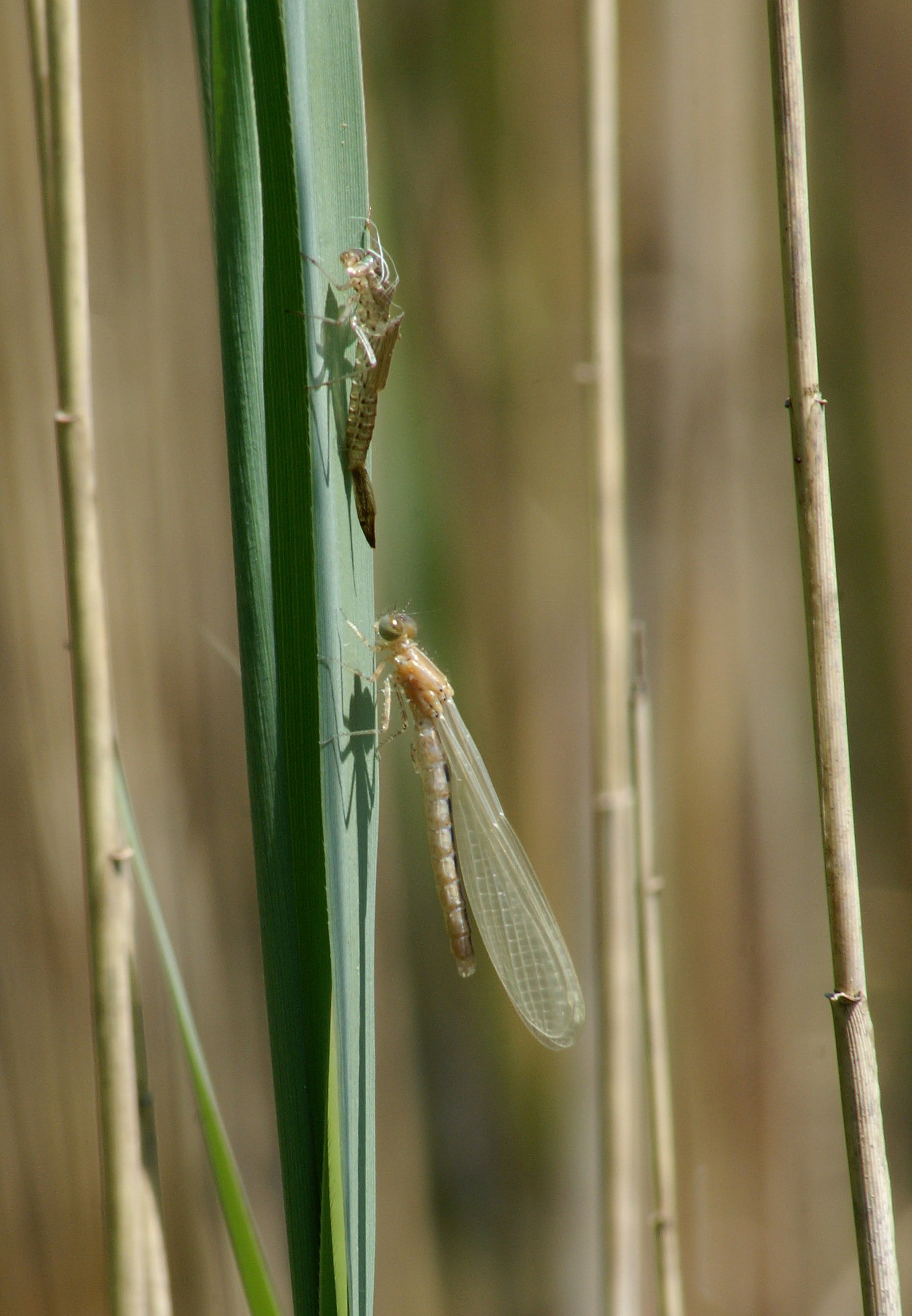
Freshly emerged with exuvia

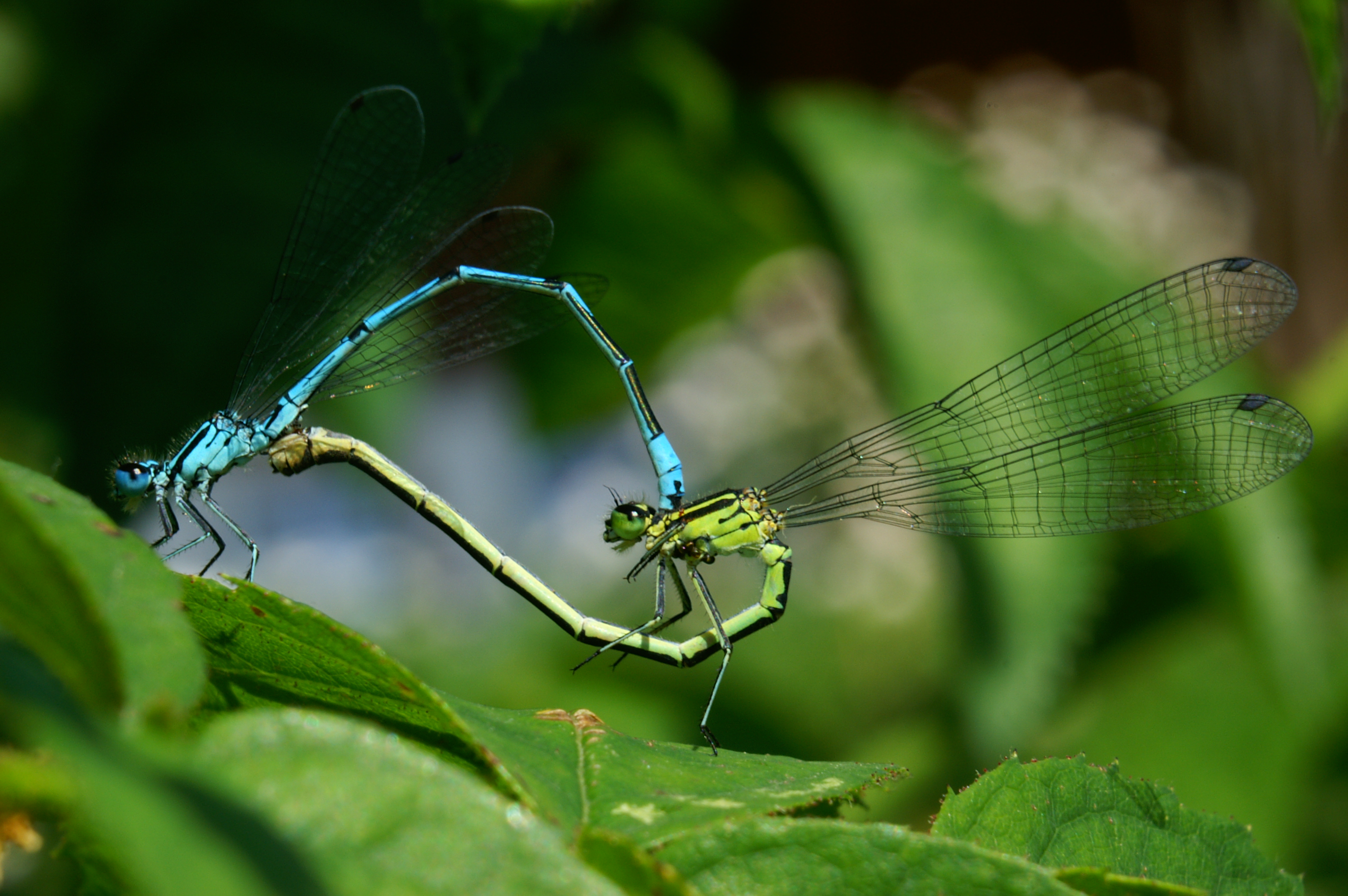
mating, female green form

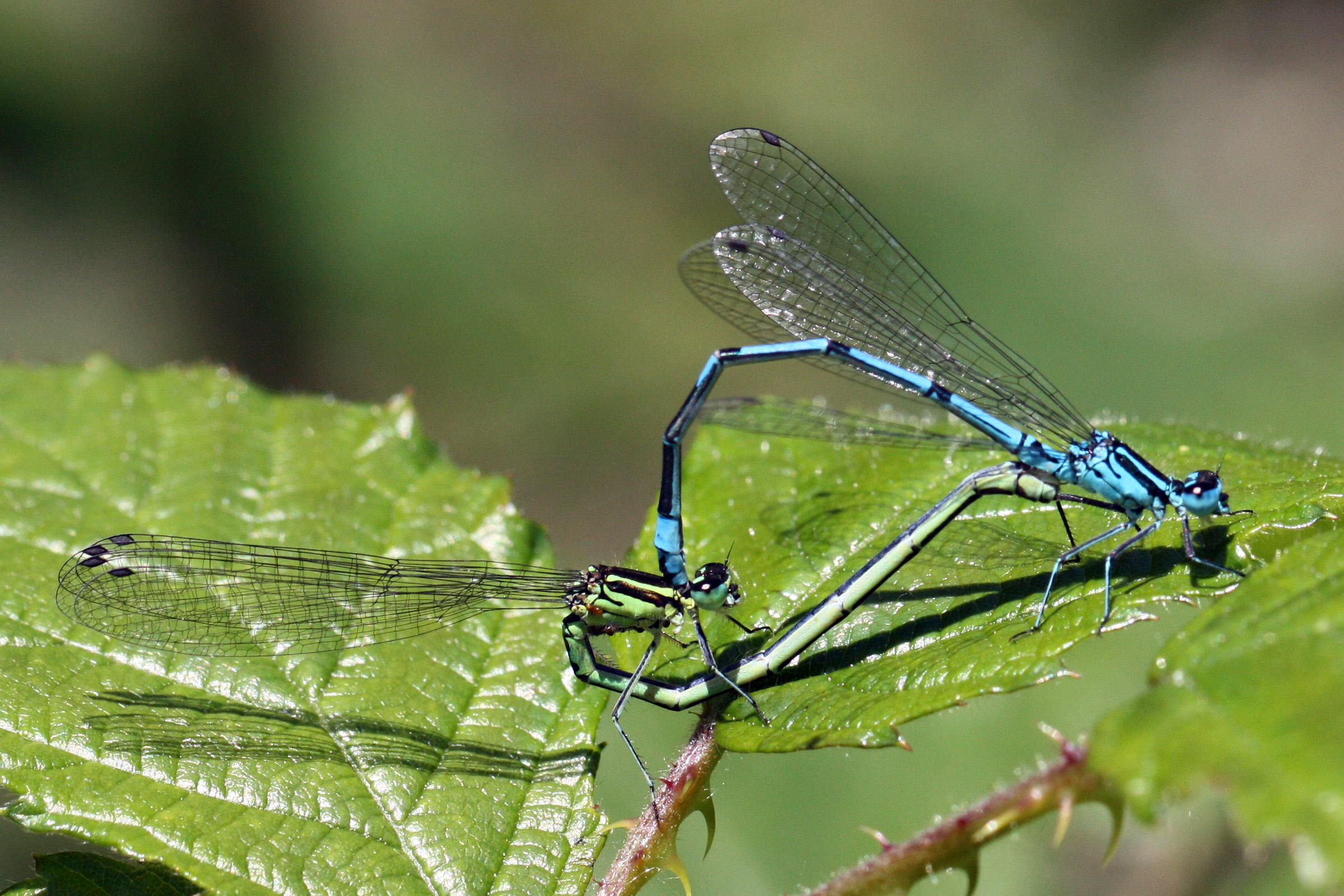
mating, female green form

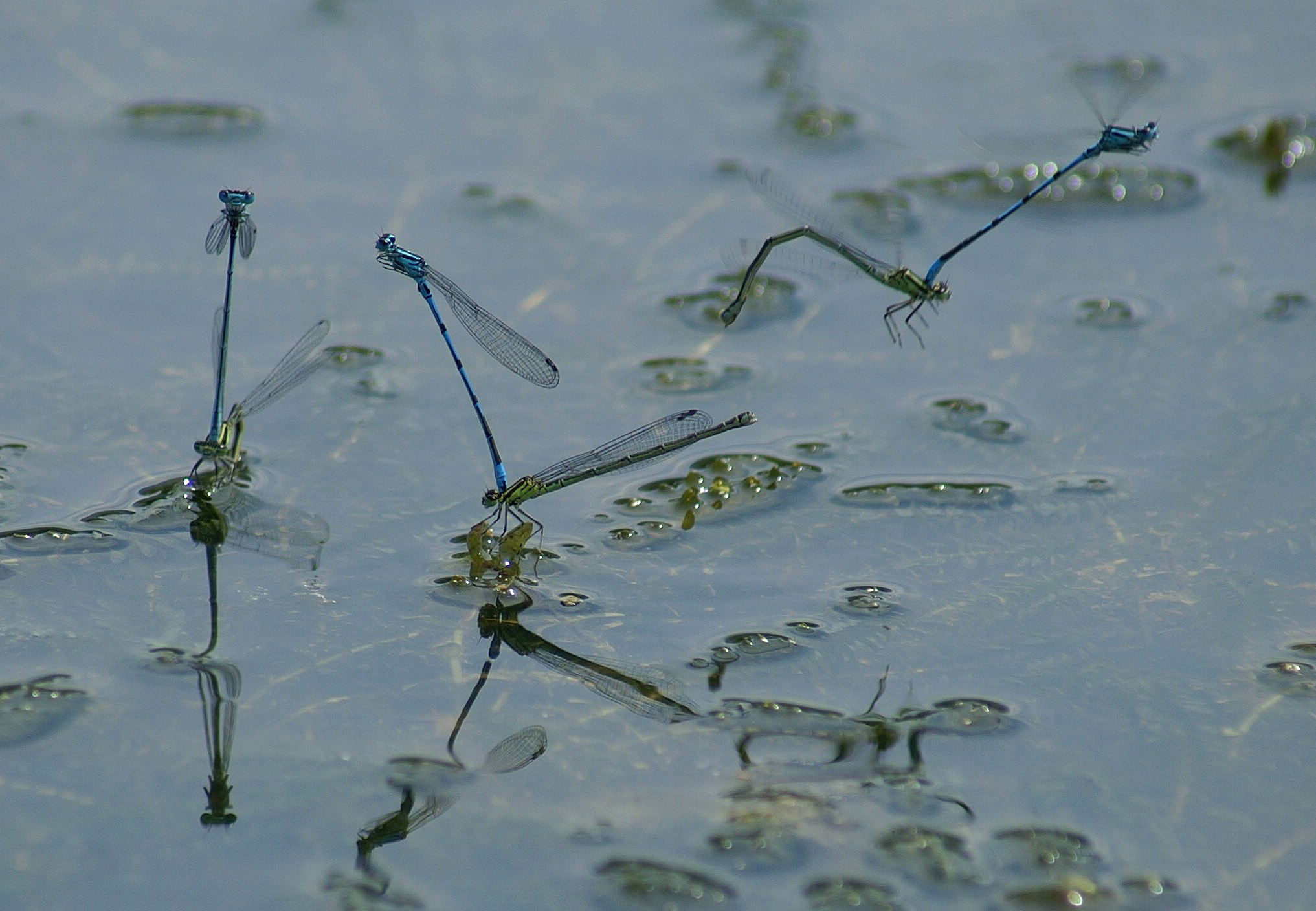
laying eggs, ovipositing

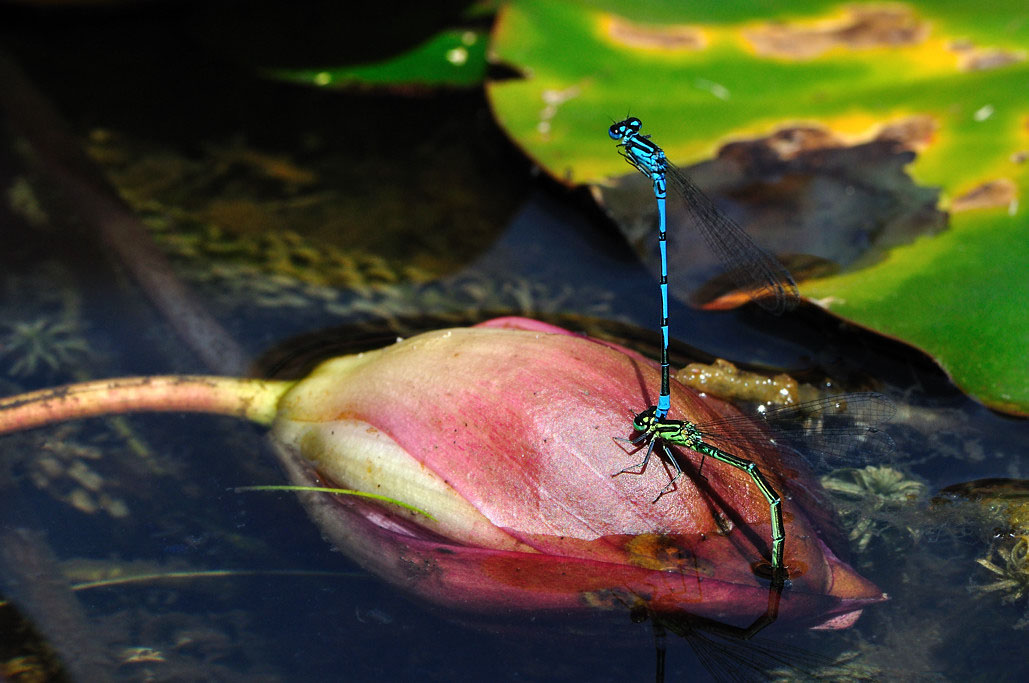
laying eggs, ovipositing

mating
