= Bake =

Bake is the verb form of baking, a method of preparing food. It may also refer to:

== People ==
- Bake (surname)
- Bake McBride (born 1949), American baseball player
- Bake Turner (born 1940), American Football League and National Football League player
- Valentine Baker (1888–1942), nicknamed "Bake," British First World War fighter pilot and co-founder of the Martin-Baker Aircraft Company

== Places ==
- Bake, Chongqing, People's Republic of China, a town
- Bake, Cornwall, England, a hamlet
- Bake Fishing Lakes, also known as Bake Lakes, Cornwall

== Other uses ==
- Casserole, also referred to as a "bake" in British English
- Bloggers Association of Kenya, community organization of bloggers in Kenya
- Caching the results of a computer graphics calculation in a Texture map or Vertex attributes

== See also ==
- Bäke (disambiguation)
- Fried bake, a flour-based product
- David Baker (poker player, born 1986), American professional poker player nicknamed "Bakes"
