= Baake =

Baake is a German surname. Notable people with this name include:

- Ellen Baake (born 1961), German mathematical biologist
- Franz Baake (born 1931), Academy Award nominated German documentary film director
- Hans-Jürgen Baake (born 1954), German footballer
- Werner Baake (1918–1964), German World War II flying ace
- Wolfgang Baake (1950–2025), German theologian and journalist

== See also ==
- Bake (surname)
