= Niaje =

Kenyan digital media website

- Industry: Online Media
- Founded: 2006
- Headquarters: Kenya
- Number of employees: 8 (2006)
- Website: Niaje.com

Niaje is a Kenyan digital media website founded in 2006 by David Mugo. It shared content in the entertainment, lifestyle and sports categories. Niaje.com is the oldest entertainment blog in Kenya; it was registered on November 1, 2006 and is among Kenya's top blogs.

== Lifestyle & Event Photography ==
Niaje made a buzz in 2013 as the main photography partner in almost all major entertainment events in Nairobi, including events sponsored by the mainstream media like Nation Media Group, capturing moments of party goers and publishing them on their Facebook page.

== Awards and recognition ==
In 2013, Niaje won 2 awards at the Bloggers Association of Kenya (BAKE) Awards—The Best Entertainment Blog and The Overall Best Blog in 2013. In 2014, Niaje won the Webfluential African Blog of the Year Award. Niaje also won the 2017 Entertainment blog of the year award at BAKE Awards 2017.
