= Bake (surname) =

Bake or Bäke is a surname. Notable people with these surnames include:

- Dek Bake (born 1984), American football player
- Franz Bäke (1898–1978), German Army officer and Panzer commander
- Jan Bake (1787–1864), Dutch philologist and critic
- Joseph Theodore Bake (1950–2017), Tanzanian orthopedics surgeon
- Laurens Bake (1629–1702), Dutch poet

== See also ==
- Martin Bakes (1937–2025), English footballer
- Baake, a German surname
