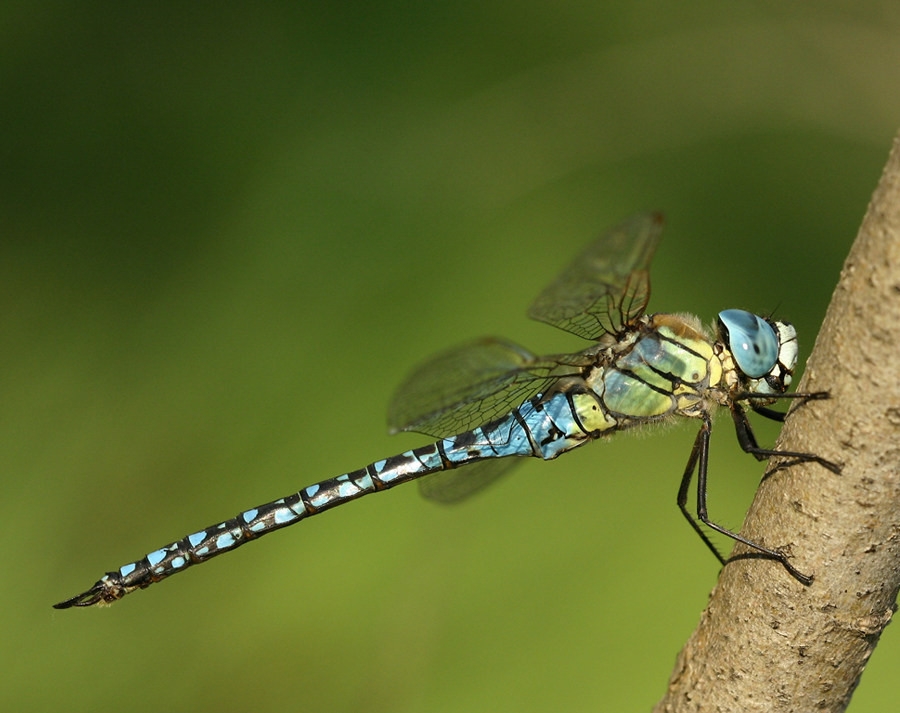
- Male A. affinis
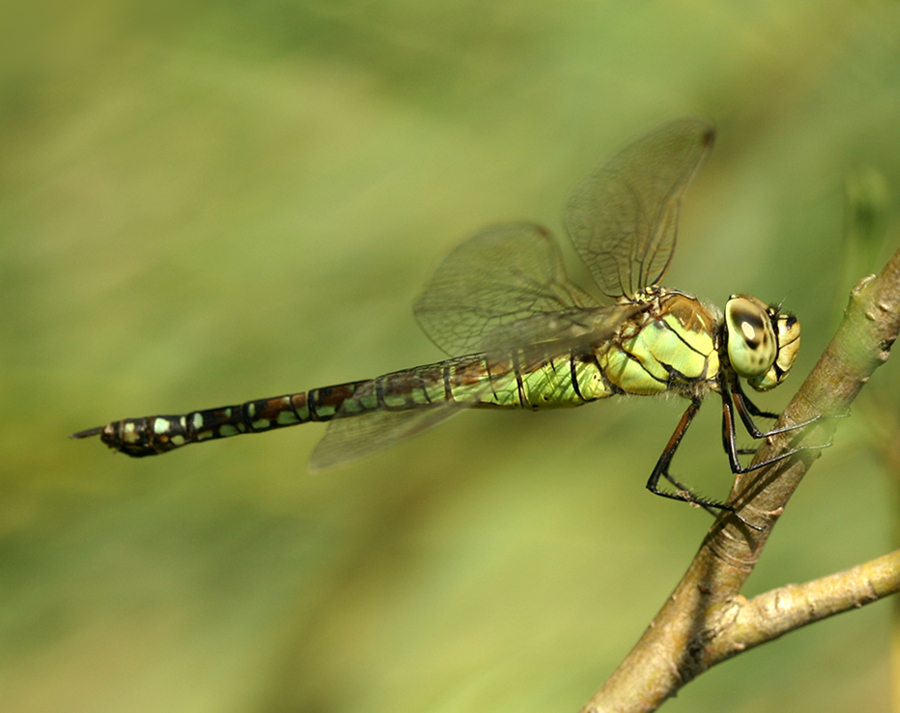
- Female A. affinis

Scientific classification
- Domain: Eukaryota
- Kingdom: Animalia
- Phylum: Arthropoda
- Class: Insecta
- Order: Odonata
- Infraorder: Anisoptera
- Family: Aeshnidae
- Genus: Aeshna
- Species: A. affinis

Binomial name
- Aeshna affinis Vander Linden, 1820

= Aeshna affinis =

Migrant hawker

Species of dragonfly

Aeshna affinis, the southern migrant hawker or blue-eyed hawker, is a dragonfly found in southern Europe and Asia. It is in the family Aeshnidae and is very similar in appearance to A. mixta.

== Identification ==
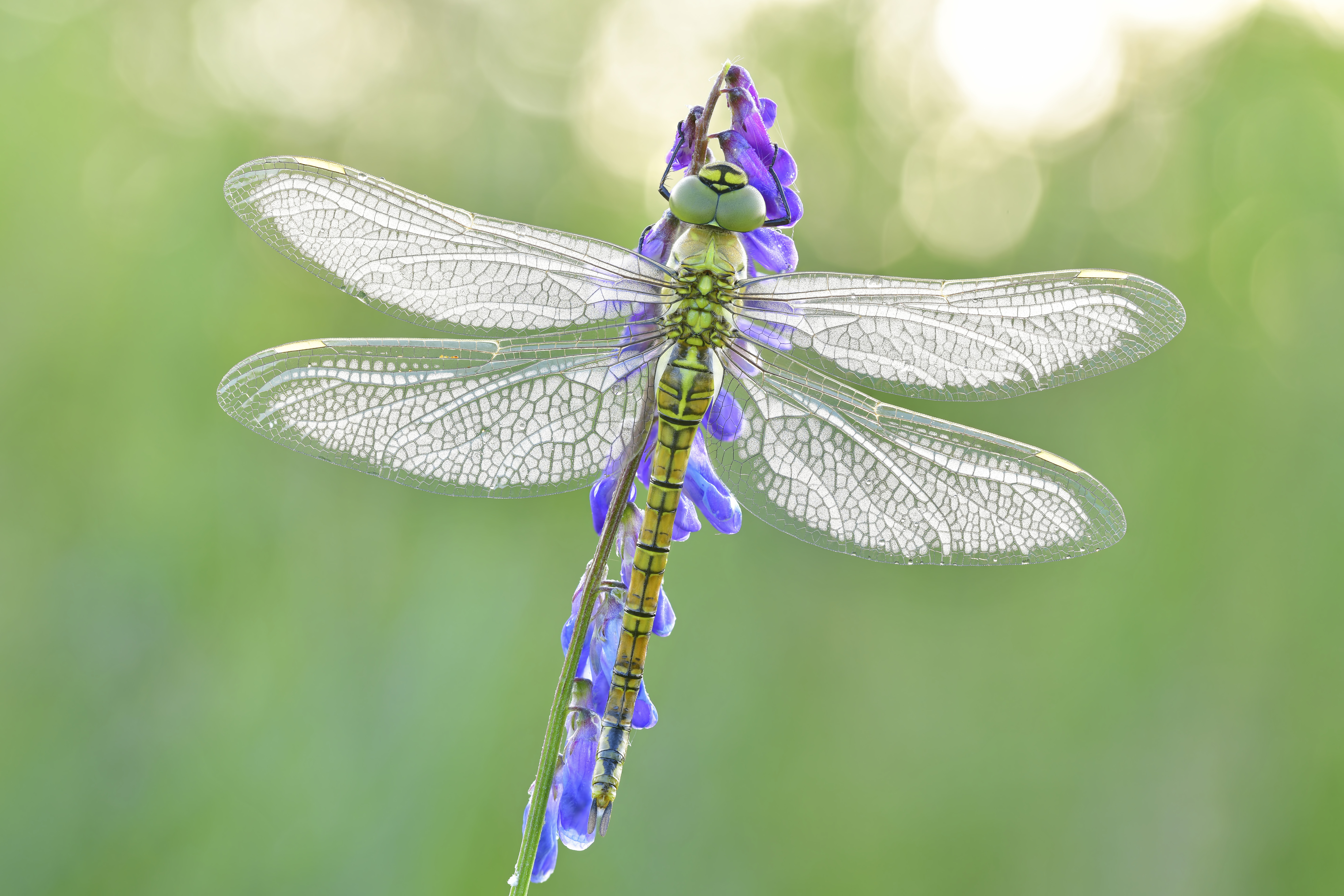
Top view, female

Aeshna affinis is a small Aeshna and very similar to the related A. mixta with which it is easily confused. As its name suggests the male has blue eyes and also blue marking on the abdomen. A. affinis lacks the yellow T-shaped mark which is found on the top of the second abdomen segment in A. mixta. The markings on the side of the thorax are also different in A. affinis and A. mixta. In A. affinis the sides of the thorax are greeny yellow with fine black lines along the sutures. In A. mixta the sides of the thorax are similar in colour but the yellow is separated by dark brown areas so it gives the appearance of having two broad yellow stripes

== Distribution and habitat ==
Aeshna affinis is found in southern and central Europe and all around the Mediterranean, in North Africa and the Middle East and across Asia to China. It is found on many Mediterranean islands including Menorca, Corsica, and Sicily. Where it occurs with A. mixta, which has a more northerly distribution, it is less common. It is a migrant species and so is found further northwards in good years.

== Behaviour ==
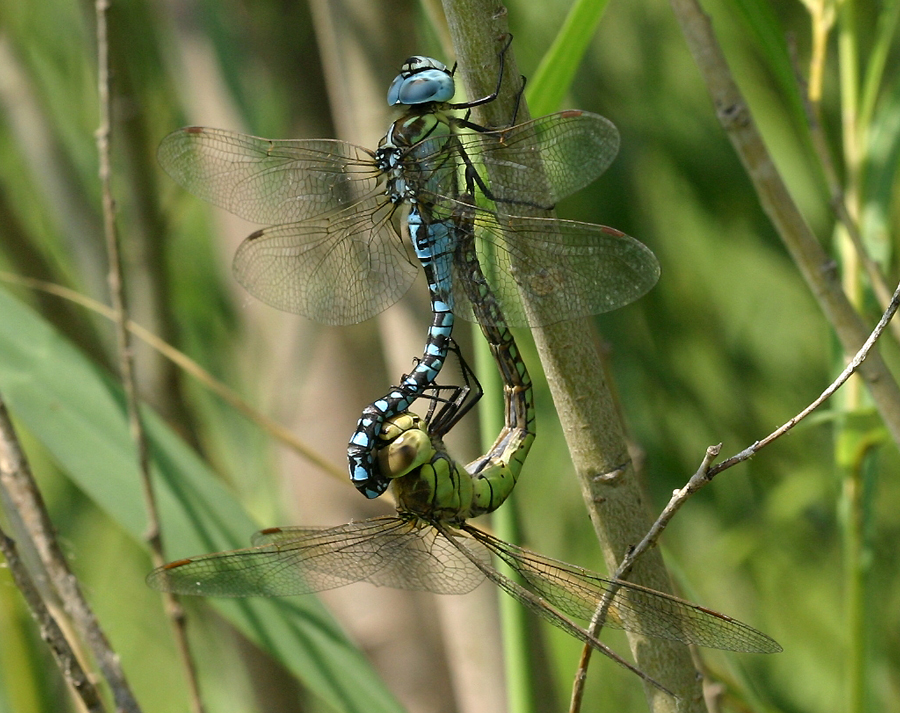
A. affinis in copula.

Adults emerge in May and are on the wing until September. After emergence the immature adults move away from water and spend a time feeding and becoming sexually mature. This period will last 10 days to many weeks. Males are often seen patrolling low down whereas A. mixta tends to patrol higher up in the trees. After maturation the males patrol well vegetated ponds and lakes looking for females. The female will be grabbed and the pair will copulate. After sperm is transferred the male A. affinis stays with the female for egg laying which is usually in vegetation. A. affinis is the only European Aeshna to lay its eggs in tandem; the only other European hawker to lay eggs in tandem is Anax parthenope. The larval stage usually lasts two years.
