= Bake Fishing Lakes =

Group of lakes in Cornwall, England

Coordinates: 50.40404°N 4.36827°W

Bake Fishing Lakes (grid reference SX318587); also known as Bake Lakes, Bake Farm Lakes or Bake Pools; is the name for a group of lakes at Bake Farm, near Trerulefoot, Cornwall, England, UK.

There are seven lakes in total; they are used for angling, and are stocked with a variety of fish species.

The site is known among dragonfly enthusiasts as one of the first sites in Britain where the Lesser Emperor was recorded as breeding, in 1999 (Pellow 2000).
