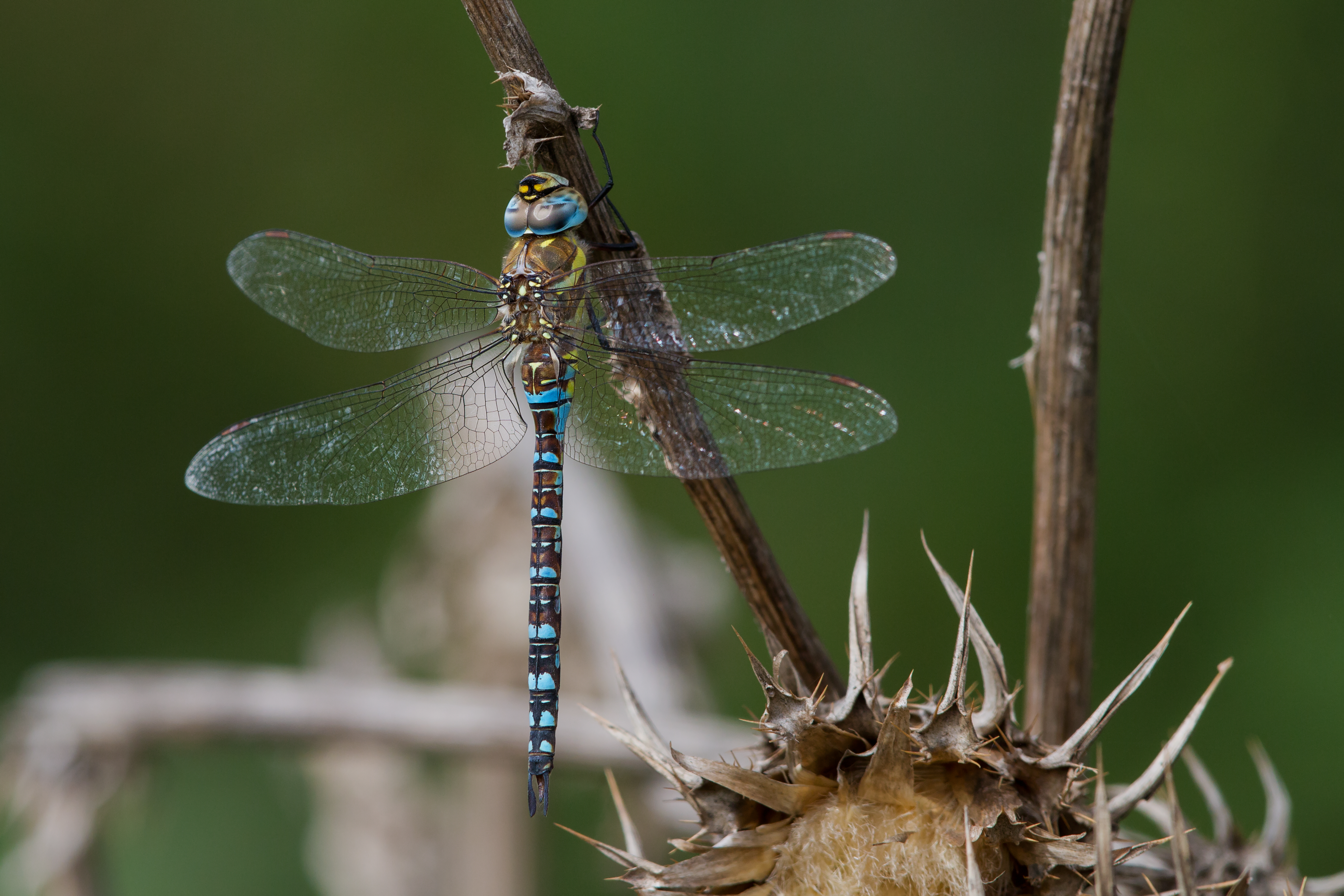
- Male
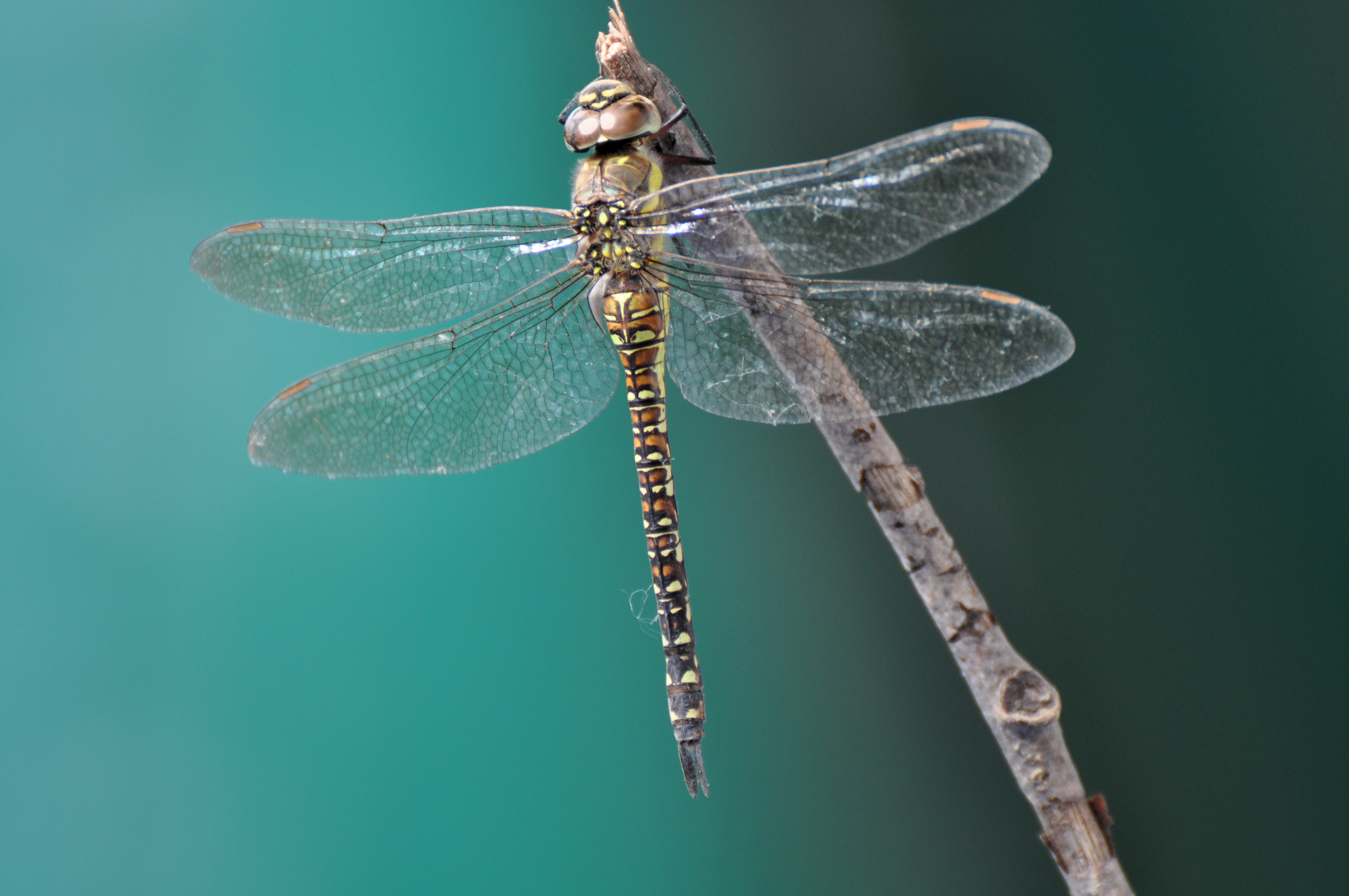
- Female

Scientific classification
- Kingdom: Animalia
- Phylum: Arthropoda
- Class: Insecta
- Order: Odonata
- Infraorder: Anisoptera
- Family: Aeshnidae
- Genus: Aeshna
- Species: A. mixta

Binomial name
- Aeshna mixta Latreille, 1805
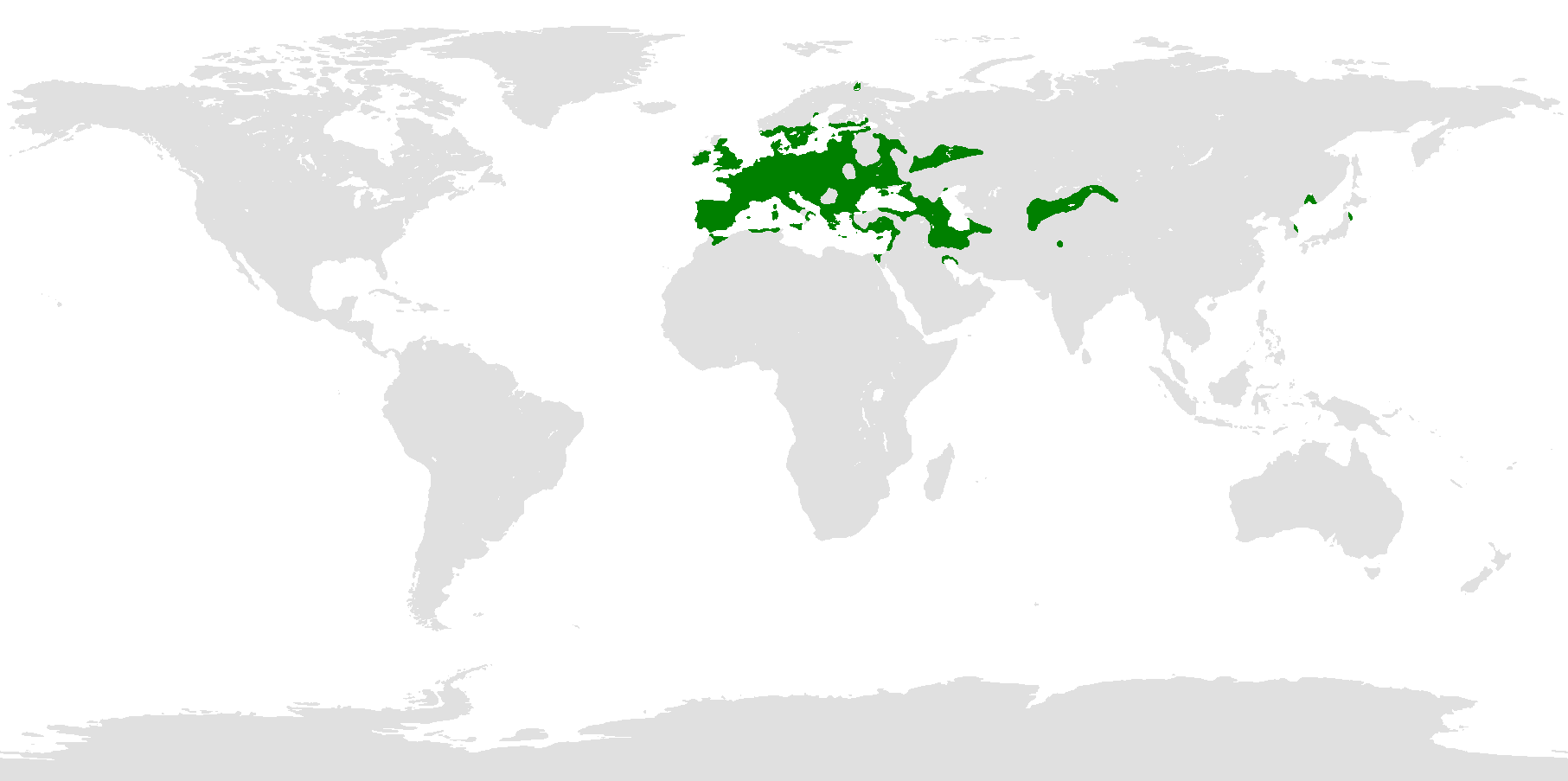
- Range of Aeshna mixta

= Migrant hawker =

Species of dragonfly

The migrant hawker or autumn hawker (Aeshna mixta) is one of the smaller species of hawker dragonflies. It can be found away from water but for breeding it prefers still or slow-flowing water and can tolerate brackish sites. The flight period is from July to the middle of November. A. mixta occurs in North Africa, southern and central Europe to southern Scandinavia and the Baltic region.

== Identification ==
A. mixta is a small Aeshna which appears dark in flight. It is similar in appearance to other Aeshna species but has a characteristic "golf-tee" shaped mark on the second segment of the abdomen (S2) which is diagnostic. In flight it looks like a small Emperor dragonfly with a blue abdomen which, when seen from the side, curves down. The main identification problem in the field is distinguishing this species from A. affinis where the two species fly together. The markings on the side of the thorax are different in A. affinis and A. mixta. In A. affinis the sides of the thorax are greeny yellow with fine black lines along the sutures. In A. mixta the sides of the thorax are similar in colour but the yellow is separated by dark brown areas so it gives the appearance of having two broad yellow stripes.

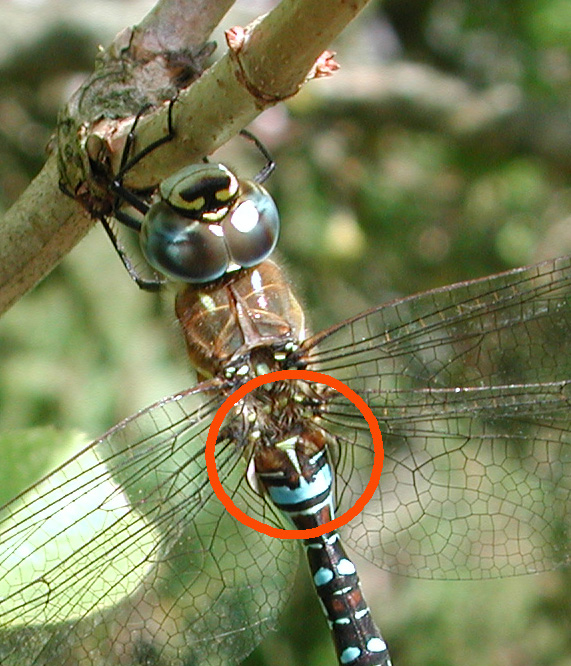
Male, showing markings

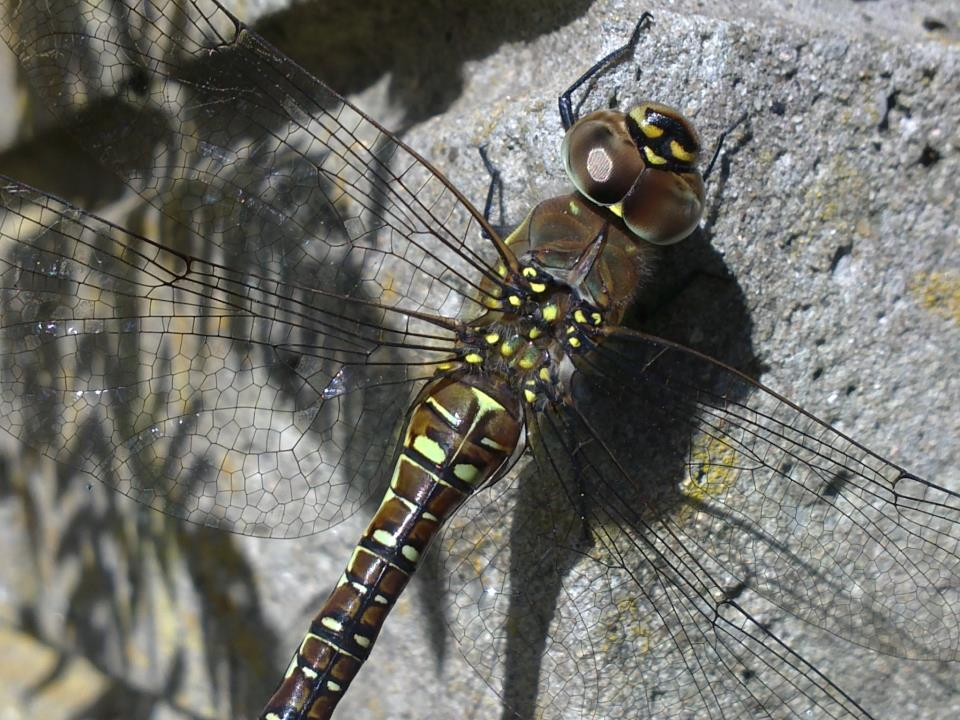
Female, showing markings

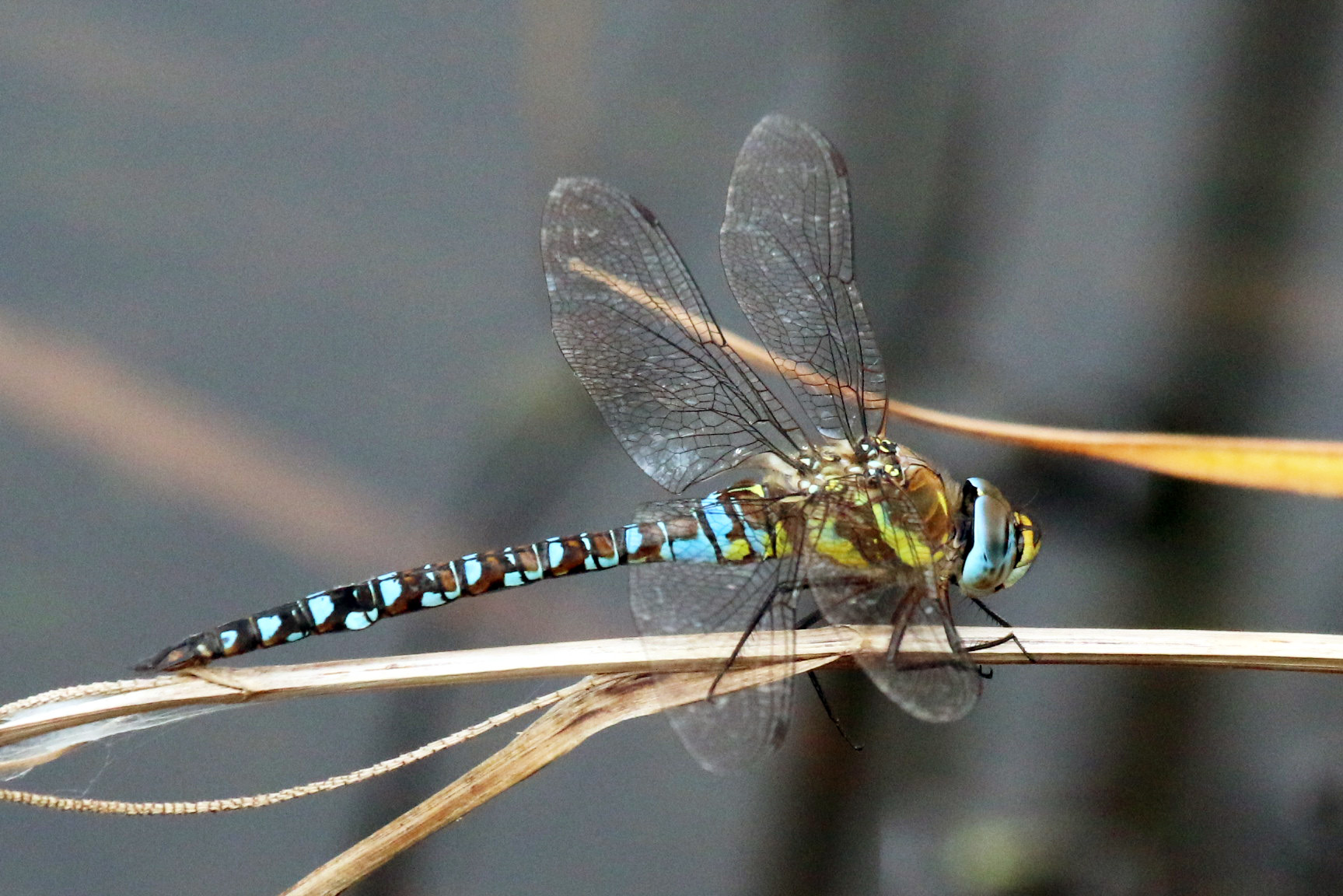
Male

== Distribution and habitat ==
A. mixta is found throughout central and southern Europe, north Africa, the Middle East and across Asia to China and Japan. As it is a migratory species it can occur outside its normal range and in recent years it has been spreading northwards. For example in the United Kingdom this insect was rare until the 1940s when it began migrating from the continent in large numbers. It continues to do so and is now a resident breeding species throughout England, Wales, and southern Scotland, with scattered records north to Orkney. It reached the Isle of Man in 1998 and Ireland in 2000. It breeds in lakes and ponds and is tolerant of brackish water. It is also found away from water hawking high amongst trees and bushes, but often resting low on vegetation.

== Behaviour ==
A. mixta has been seen on the wing in all months of the year but most commonly from July to early or even late November. After emergence, the immature adults fly away from water and spends their time feeding and becoming sexually mature. They are not territorial and they are often seen feeding or resting in groups, occasionally forming large feeding swarms. They can be found around trees and bushes quite high up. Once mature, they return to water and begin mating behaviour with the males patrolling looking for females. A. mixta males are less territorial than other male Aeshna. Males form a tandem pairing with a female on the wing and copulate. After mating the male and female split up and the female oviposits alone. The eggs develop and then enter dipause and it is as diapause eggs that A. mixta overwinter. In spring the eggs hatch into a prolarva which only lasts from a few seconds to a few minutes, the prolarva then moults into a stadium 2 larva. Larval development is rapid and adults emerge in summer. A. mixta is a univoltine species, completing its life-cycle in one year.

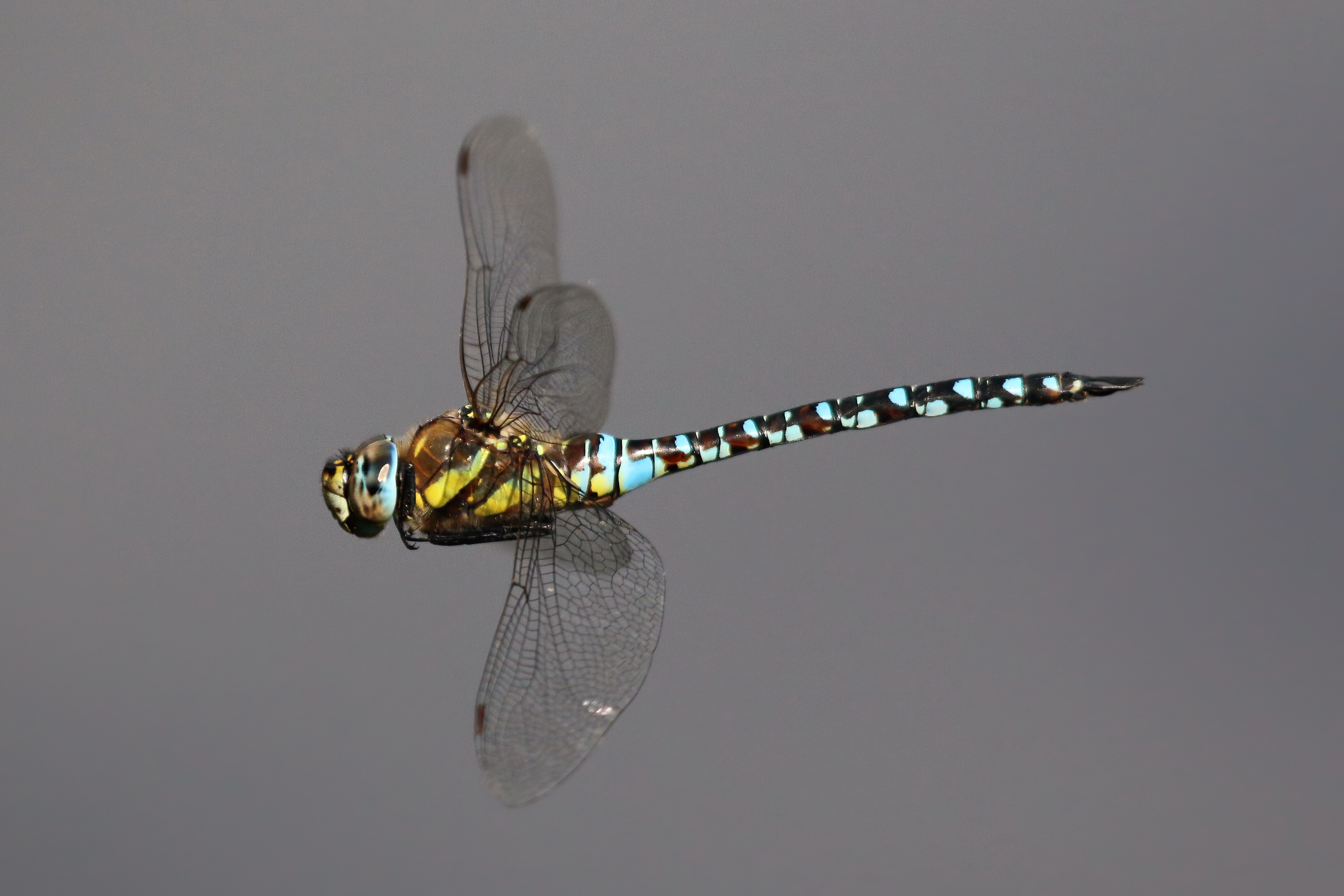
Male in flight

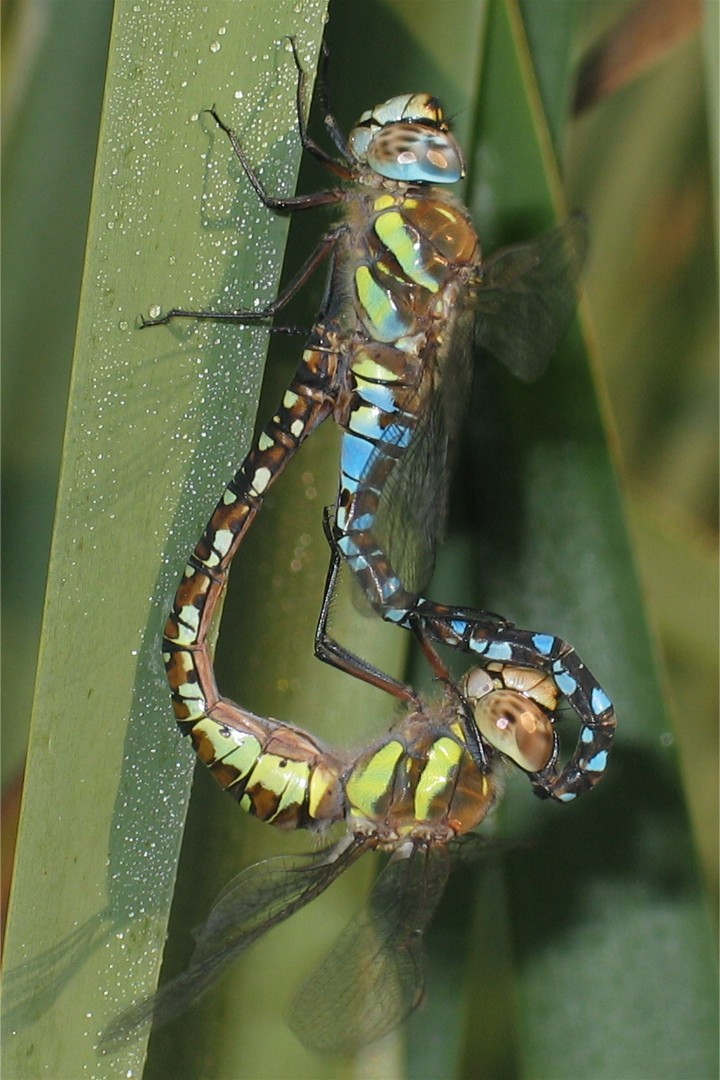
In copula (mating)

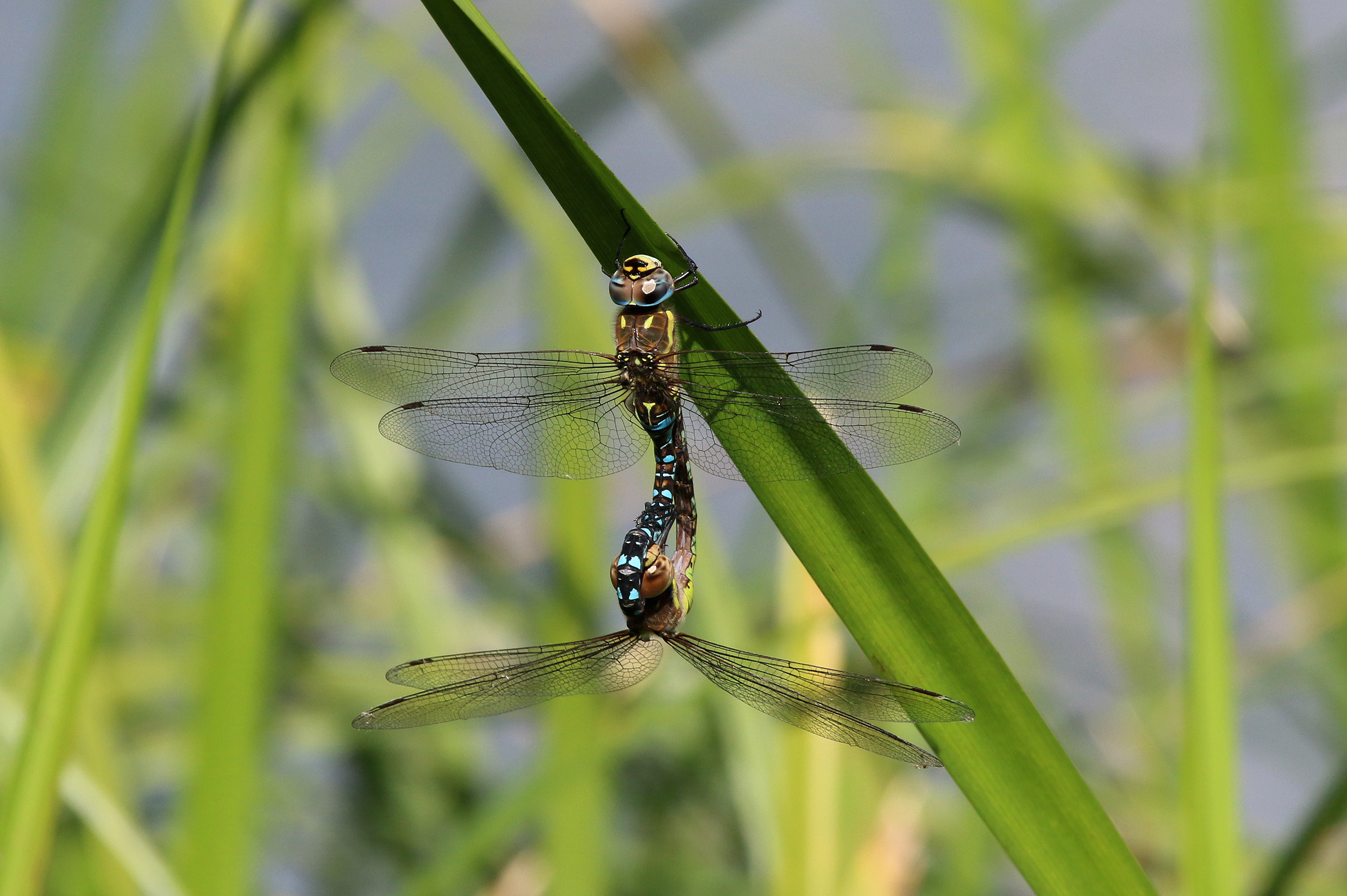
In copula

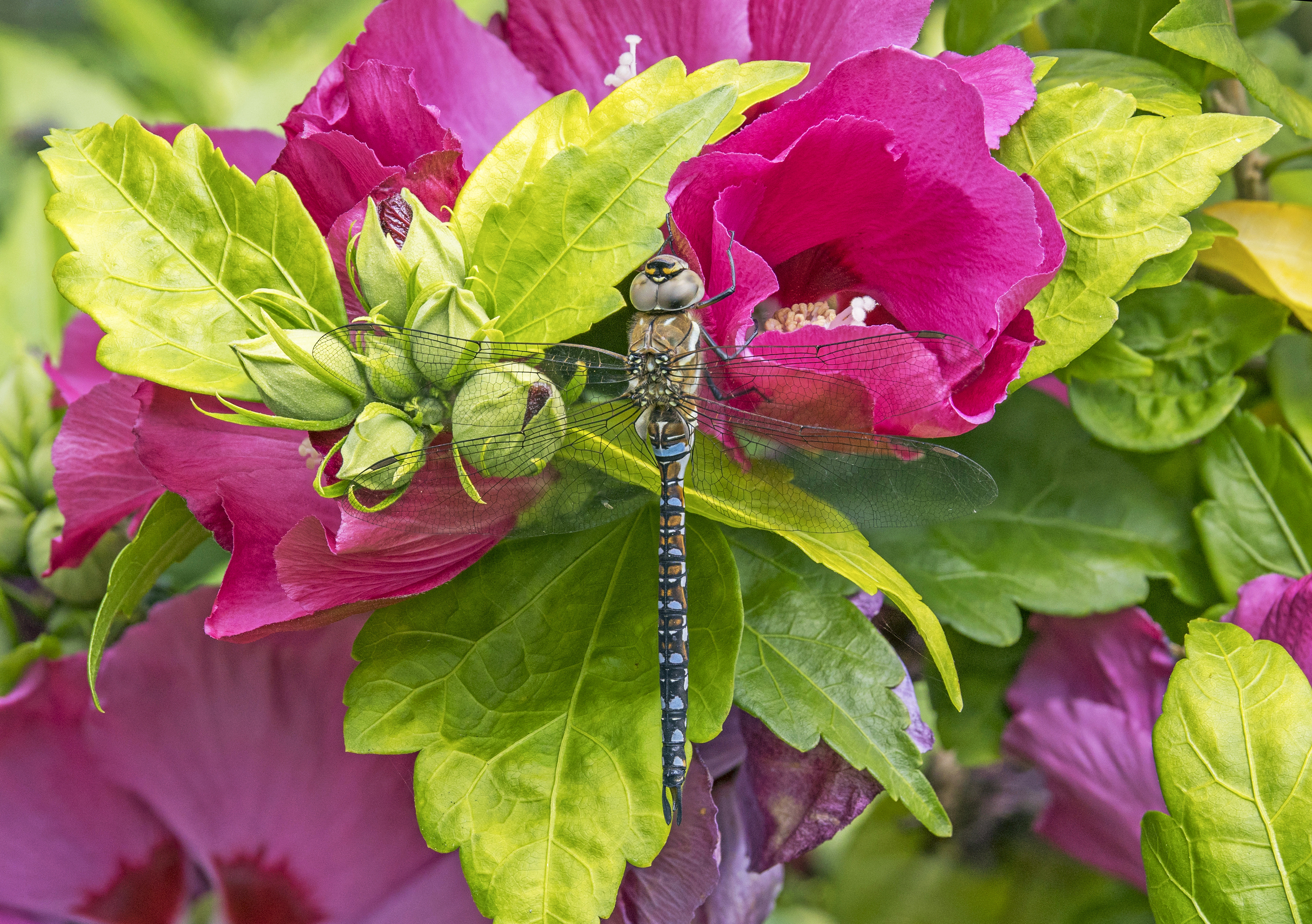
Male on Hibiscus syriacus
