= Wolfgang Baake =

German journalist and author (1950–2025)

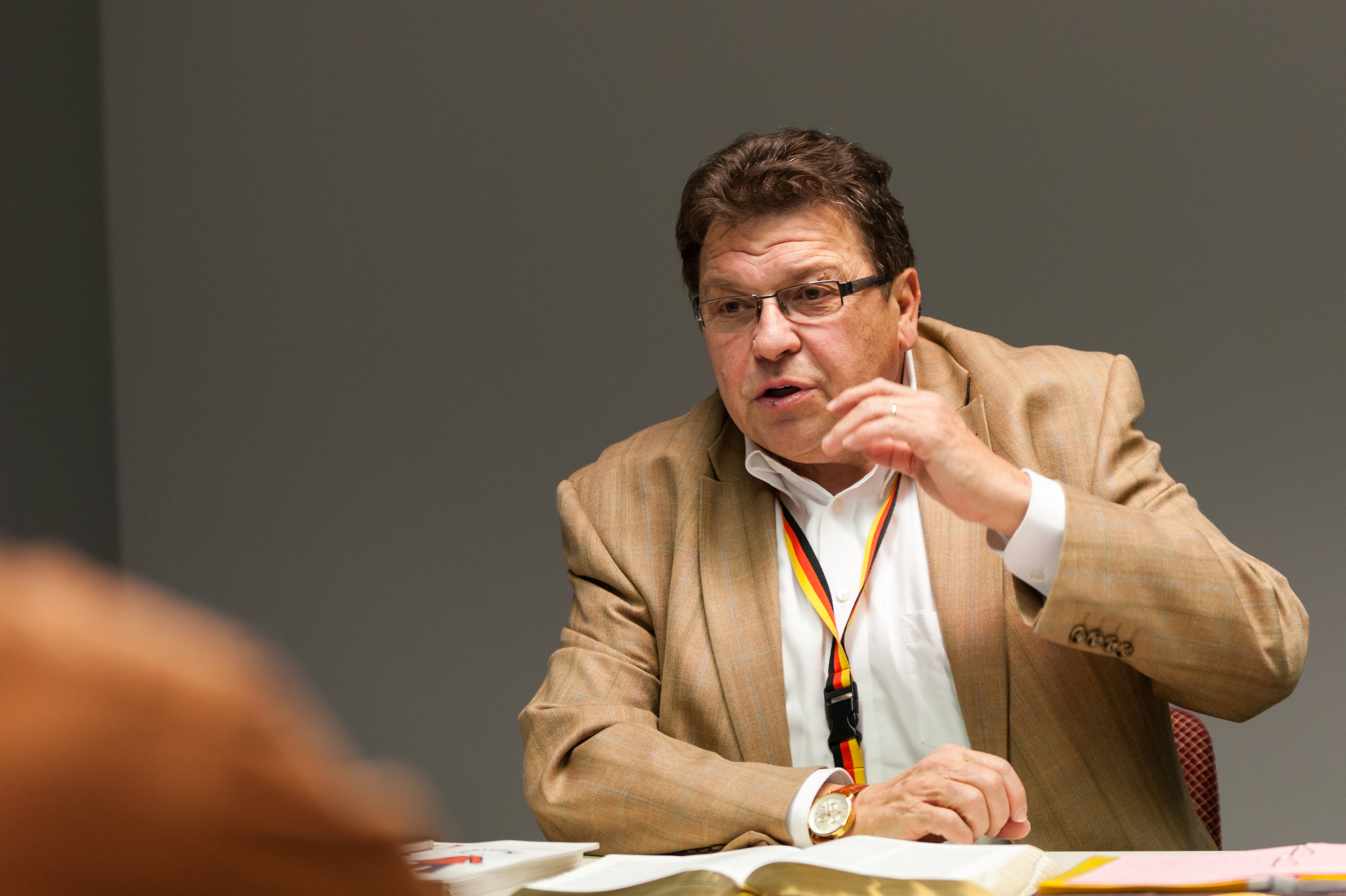
- Baake in 2012
- Born: 6 December 1950; Warburg, North Rhine-Westphalia, Germany
- Died: 8 December 2025 (aged 75)
- Occupations: Journalist; Theologian

Wolfgang Baake (6 December 1950 – 8 December 2025) was a German theologian and journalist.

== Life and career ==
Baake was born in Warburg, North Rhine-Westphalia on 6 December 1950. He worked for ten years as an industrial clerk at Volkswagen.

He studied theology at the Marburg University from 1976 to 1982. After passing his second theological examination in June 1982, he completed a traineeship of just under a year in the newsroom of the NDR's Tagesschau and Tagesthemen programs in Hamburg.

Baake died on 8 December 2025, at the age of 75.
