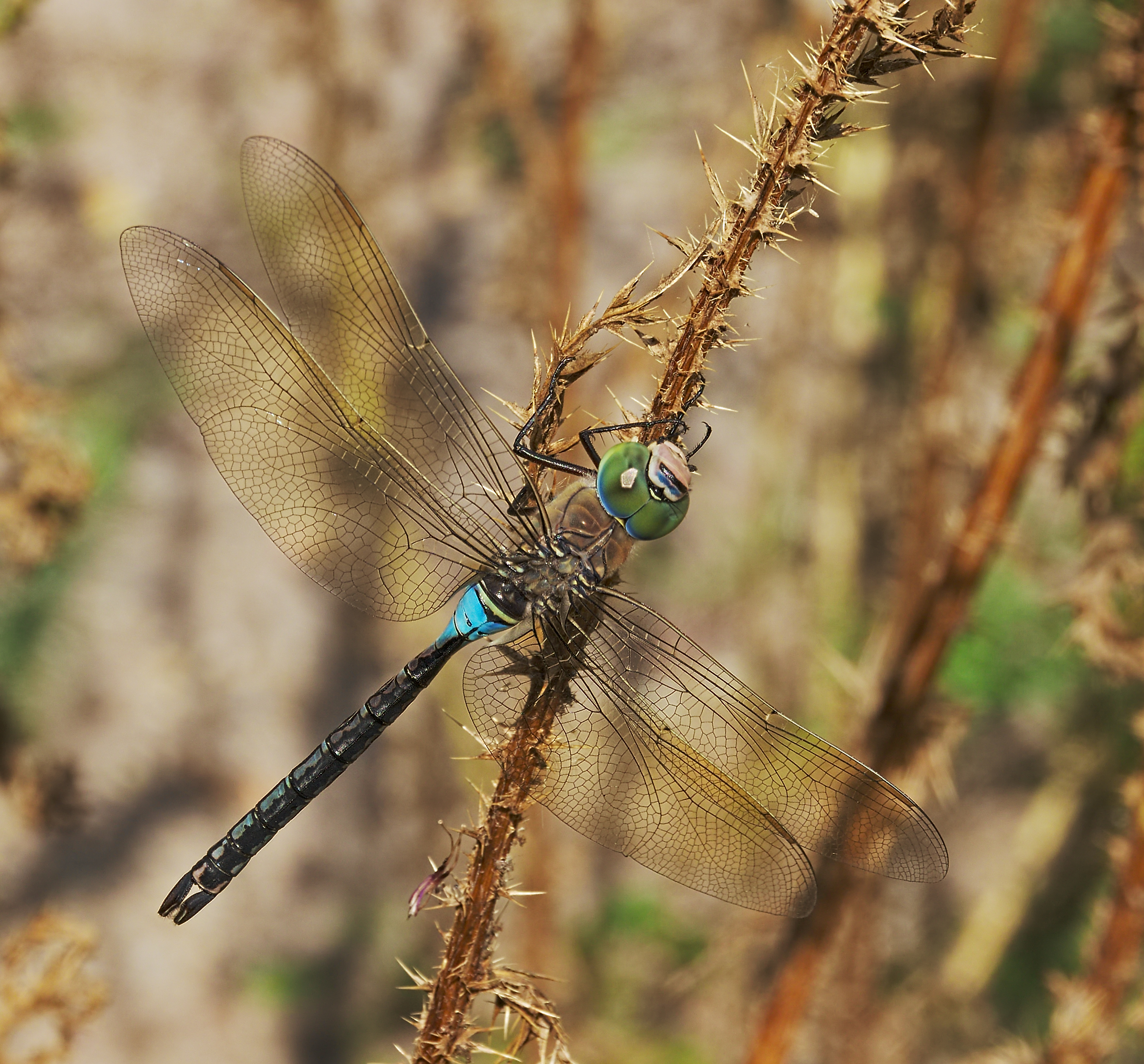
- Male
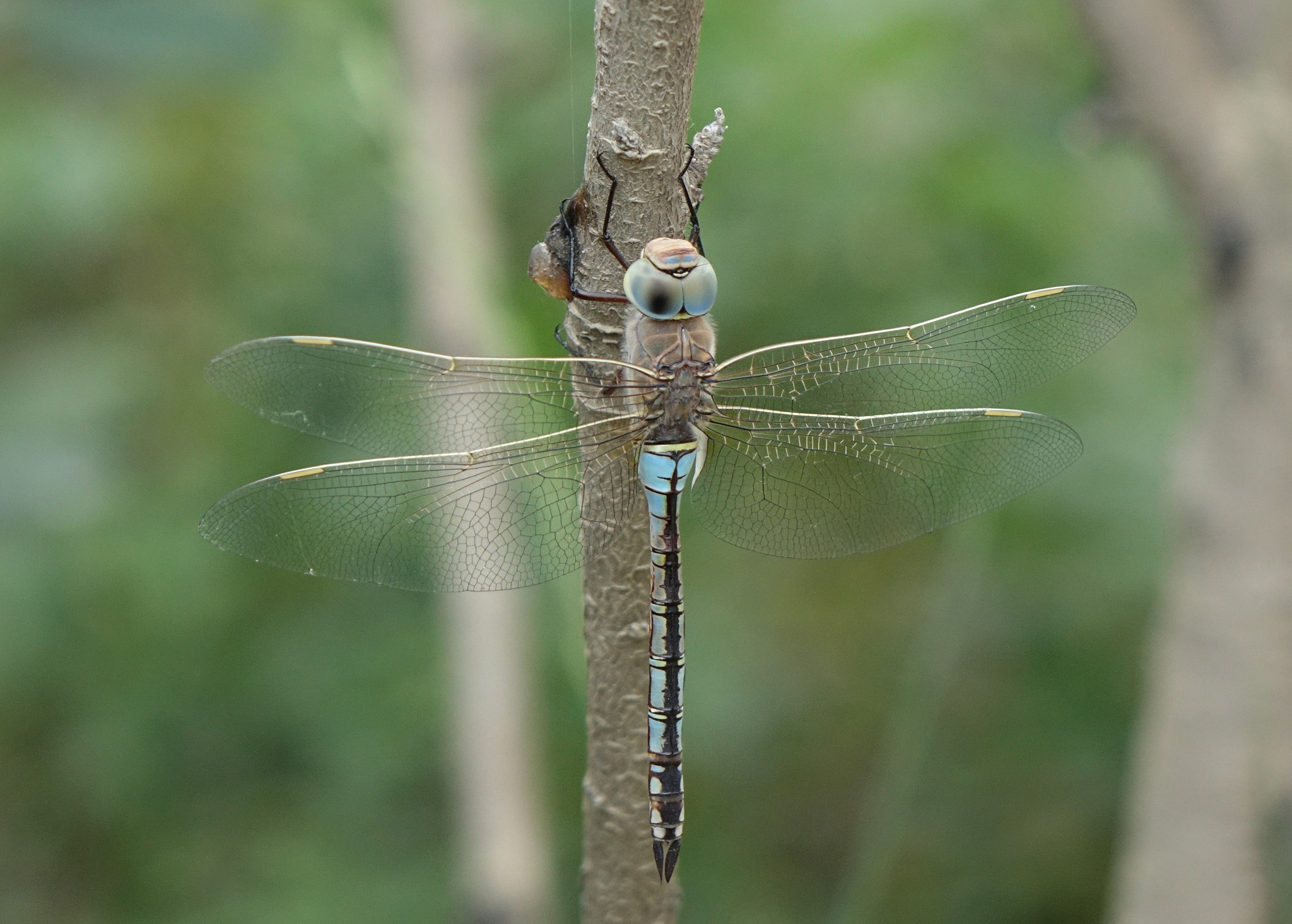
- Female, Russia

Conservation status
- Least Concern (IUCN 3.1)

Scientific classification
- Kingdom: Animalia
- Phylum: Arthropoda
- Clade: Pancrustacea
- Class: Insecta
- Order: Odonata
- Suborder: Anisoptera
- Family: Aeshnidae
- Genus: Anax
- Species: A. parthenope

Binomial name
- Anax parthenope (Sélys, 1839); Original genus: Aeshna

= Anax parthenope =

Lesser emperor

Species of dragonfly

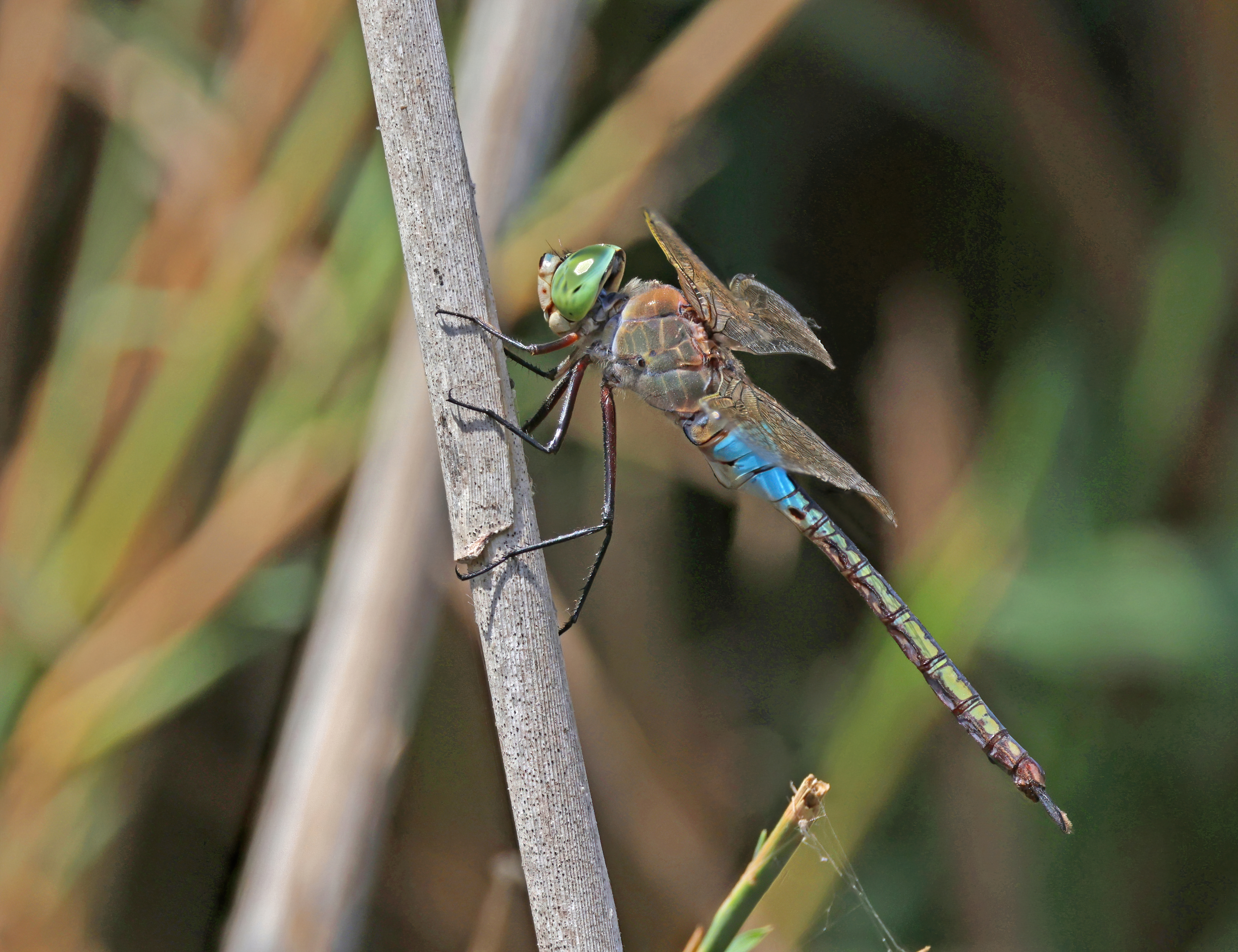
male, Cyprus

Anax parthenope, the lesser emperor, is a dragonfly of the family Aeshnidae. It is found in Southern Europe, North Africa, West Asia.

== Description ==
It is a crepuscular dragonfly, active in the dusk. This species can be easily distinguished by the multicolored upper surface of frons and by the shape and relative lengths of the anal appendages. Its labium and labrum are golden-yellow and face and frons are greenish yellow and eyes are green, bluish when aged. Its thorax is pale olivaceous brown with dark brown sutures. Its segment two of the abdomen is turquoise blue. Segment three has a large blue patch at each side. Segments 4 to 9 have an irregular black middorsal stripe. Segment 10 is black.

== Comparison with Anax imperator ==
A. parthenope is smaller and less colourful than Anax imperator. In general appearance, especially when seen on the wing, A. parthenope is similar to A. imperator, but A. parthenope tends to hold its abdomen straighter than A. imperator. A large dragonfly seen in flight with a bent abdomen is most likely to be A. imperator rather than A. parthenope. A. parthenope has a blue saddle at S2 and S3 which can be seen in flight, which is in contrast to the rest of the abdomen, which is brown. A yellow ring is at the base of S2. The eyes are green. It is similar to A. ephippiger, although A. ephippiger is slightly smaller and slenderer and its blue saddle does not wrap around S2, but is mostly blue on top. A. ephippiger has brown eyes.

== Distribution and habitat ==
This species occurs in much of southern and central Europe, including most Mediterranean islands, across Asia to Japan, the Korean Peninsula, and China, and on to North Africa. It has been found on the Canary Islands and the Madeira Archipelago. It is spreading north and was first seen in Great Britain in 1996, where it has since bred.

== Behaviour ==
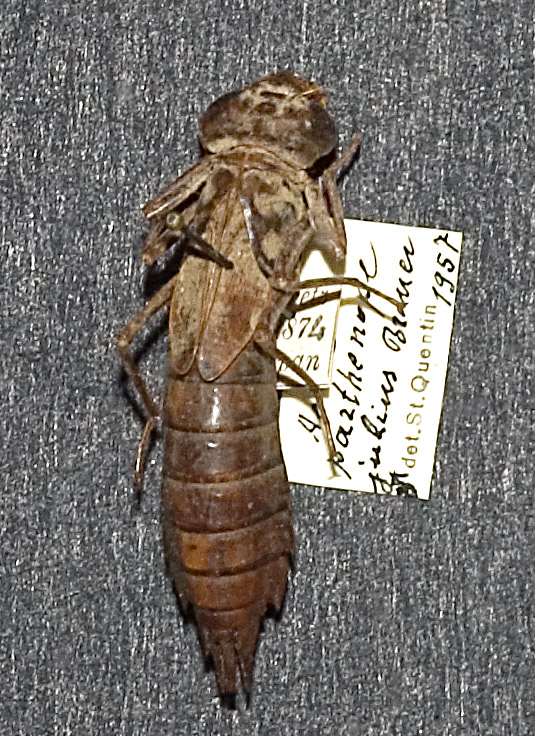
Larva of A. parthenope

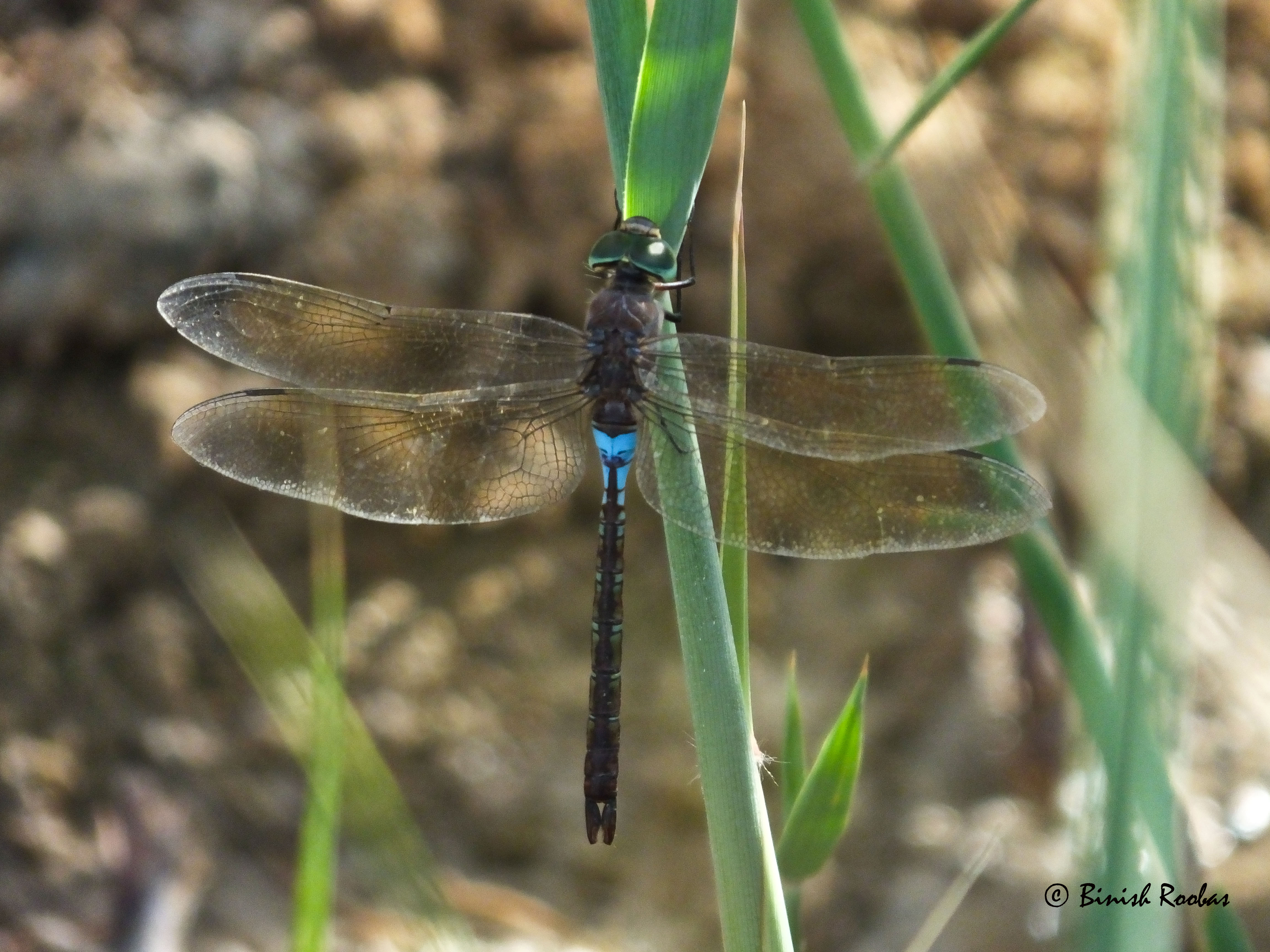
Anax parthenope from Dubai, United Arab Emirates

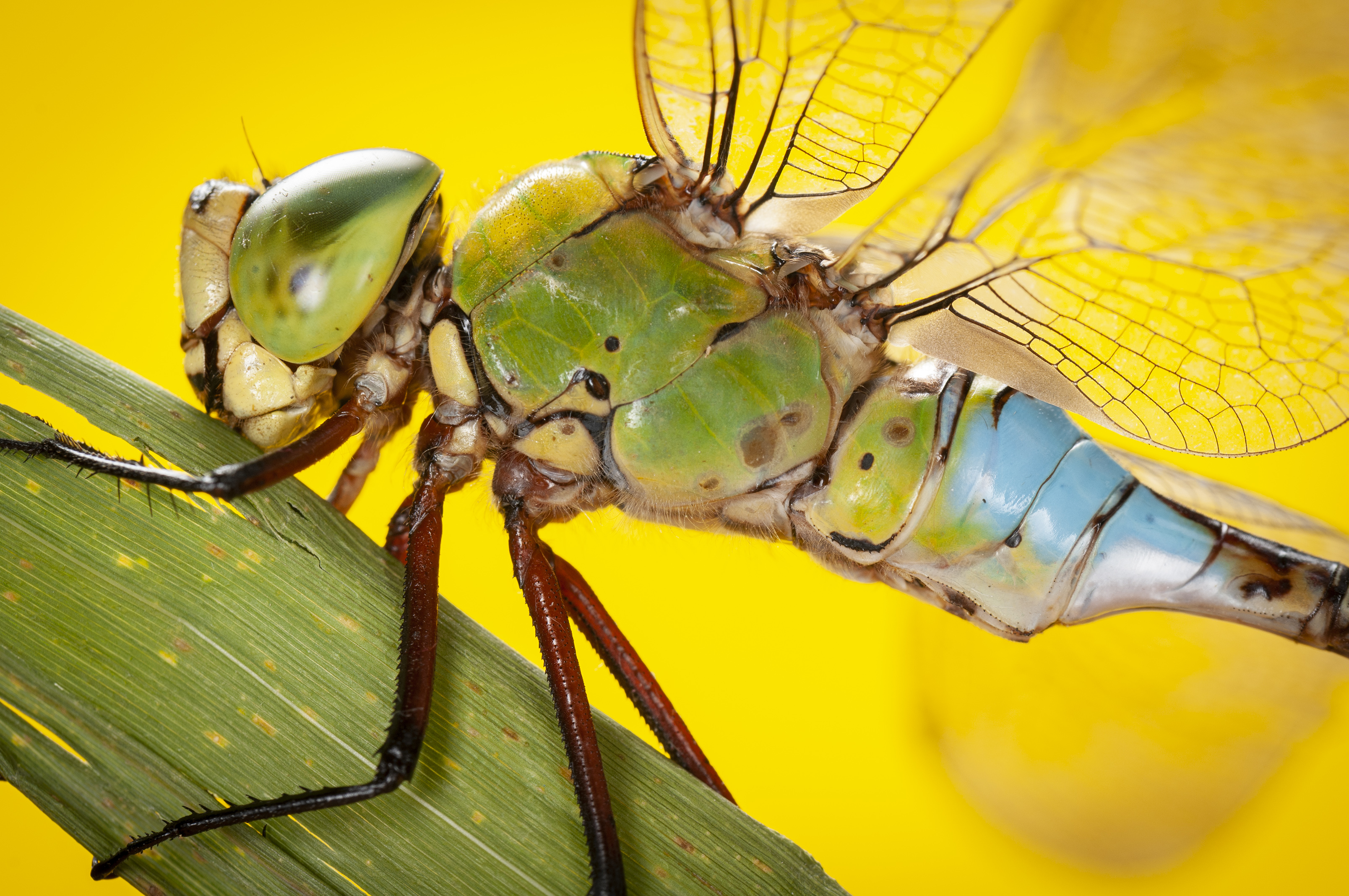
Anax parthenope julius, Adult, from South Korea

In the south of its range A. parthenope can be on the wing in March. It is most commonly seen from June to September, but can still be around in November. Often seen patrolling around ponds, lakes, and other still water, it occurs with A. imperator, but it is usually less abundant. When A. parthenope and A. imperator occur at the same ponds, A. imperator is dominant. Males and females mate in the normal dragonfly manner and after mating, the pair stay in tandem and egg-laying usually occurs whilst still in tandem. This behaviour is not seen in other European hawkers with the exception of Aeshna affinis, although two migrants to Europe, A. ephippiger and A. junius also oviposit in tandem. Eggs are inserted into plants or in mud and hatch out in two months. Larval development takes two years.
