= Ellen Baake =

German mathematical biologist (born 1961)

Ellen Baake (born 1961) is a German mathematical biologist who works as a professor of biomathematics and theoretical bioinformatics at Bielefeld University. Her research uses probability theory and differential equations to study biological evolution; she has also studied mathematical immunobiology and the mathematical modeling of photosynthesis.

== Biography ==
Baake earned a diploma in biology in 1985 from the University of Bonn, and completed her Ph.D. there in theoretical biology in 1989. Her dissertation, Ein Differentialgleichungsmodell zur Beschreibung der Fluoreszenzinduktion (OIDP-Kinetik) der Photosynthese, was supervised by Wolfgang Alt. She earned a habilitation at LMU Munich in 1999. In 2007, she was a visiting researcher on a Kloosterman Chair at Leiden University and she held faculty positions at several other universities before joining Bielefeld University. In 2004, she was named an associate professor of biomathematics and theoretical bioinformatics at the Faculty of Engineering, and since 2012, she has been a full professor there, jointly affiliated with the Faculty of Mathematics.

Baake was an invited speaker at the 2010 International Congress of Mathematicians in Hyderabad, India. In 2011, she declined an offer of a W3 professorship in Biomathematics at the Department of Mathematics at the University of Erlangen-Nuremberg. Her research focuses on the mathematical foundations of population genetics and mathematical immunobiology, where she further develops the necessary stochastic methods and uses them to investigate specific questions in evolutionary theory.

== Selected publications ==
- Baake, Ellen, Michael Baake, H. G. Bock, and K. M. Briggs. "Fitting ordinary differential equations to chaotic data." Physical Review A 45, no. 8 (1992): 5524.
- Baake, Ellen, and Johannes P. Schlöder. "Modelling the fast fluorescence rise of photosynthesis." Bulletin of Mathematical Biology 54, no. 6 (1992): 999-1021.
- Baake, Ellen, Michael Baake, and Holger Wagner. "Ising quantum chain is equivalent to a model of biological evolution." Physical Review Letters 78, no. 3 (1997): 559-562.
- Baake, Ellen, and Holger Wagner. "Mutation–selection models solved exactly with methods of statistical mechanics." Genetics Research 78, no. 1 (2001): 93-117.
- Baake, Ellen, and Wilfried Gabriel. "Biological evolution through mutation." Annual reviews of computational physics VII 7 (2000): 203-264.
