= Bäke =

Bäke may refer to:

- Bäke (Telte), a river of Berlin and Brandenburg, Germany
- Franz Bäke (1898–1978), German officer and tank commander during World War II

== See also ==
- Varreler Bäke, a river in north Germany
