= Martin Bakes =

English footballer (1937–2025)

Personal information
- Date of birth: 8 February 1937
- Place of birth: Bradford, England
- Date of death: 26 July 2025 (aged 88)
- Place of death: Scunthorpe, England
- Position: Left winger

Youth career
- –1953: Bradford City

Senior career*
Years	Team	Apps	(Gls)
1953–1959	Bradford City	72	(7)
1959–1963	Scunthorpe United	77	(5)
Total		149	(12)
- * Club domestic league appearances and goals

Martin Bakes (8 February 1937 – 26 July 2025) was an English professional footballer who played as a left winger. Bakes made a total of 149 appearances in the English Football League between 1953 and 1963, scoring 12 goals.

== Career ==
Born in Bradford, Bakes began his career in the youth team of Bradford City, before making his professional debut in the 1953–1954 season. Bakes later played for Scunthorpe United, before retiring in 1963.

== Death ==
Bakes died on 26 July 2025, at the age of 88.
