= Bloggers Association of Kenya =

Kenyan community association

The Bloggers Association of Kenya (BAKE) is a community association of Kenyan bloggers and content creators that promotes online content creation and free expression in Kenya.

Formed in 2011, the association also carries out trainings and organises the annual BAKE Awards where leading content creators are awarded. The first BAKE Awards was held in 2012 and by May 2017, featured 23 categories. BAKE also runs iFreedoms Kenya, a program that promotes human rights and media rights. iFreedoms Kenya documents important occurrences affecting freedom of expression and engagement. It also engages in public interest litigation, policy intervention, advocacy and training.

== State of the Internet Reports ==
Since 2015, BAKE produces an annual State of the Internet Report. The reports document significant events in digital rights and the internet in Kenya. The 2017 report covered the ways in which the internet played a leading role in the 2017 Kenyan general election. It also covered fears that there would be an internet shutdown during the election, as well as a significant case where the charge of criminal defamation was ruled unconstitutional. It also covered cases of cyberbullying, focusing on the suicide of a 29-year-old woman who had been bullied on Facebook.

== Litigation ==
In February 2018, BAKE moved to court seeking conservatory orders freezing criminal proceedings against Paul Ongili (Babu Owino), the then Member of Parliament for Embakasi East. BAKE questioned the validity of sections 77 and 94 of the Penal Code, saying that they violate the right to freedom of expression.

Ongili had been charged with the offence of subversion and offensive conduct for a speech he made in Dagoretti North on 24 September 2017.

== Leadership ==
The current chair of BAKE is Kennedy Kachwanya. Other members of the association include James Wamathai (Director, Partnerships), Jane Muthoni (General Manager), Victoria Wangui (Digital Communications Manager), Monica Ng'ang'a (accountant), and Ansel Melly (IT Manager).
