= Austroaeschna ingrid =

Grampians darner

Conservation status
- Endangered (IUCN 3.1)

Scientific classification
- Kingdom: Animalia
- Phylum: Arthropoda
- Clade: Pancrustacea
- Class: Insecta
- Order: Odonata
- Suborder: Anisoptera
- Family: Aeshnidae
- Genus: Austroaeschna
- Species: A. ingrid

Binomial name
- Austroaeschna ingrid Theischinger, 2008

Species of dragonfly

Austroaeschna ingrid is a species of large dragonfly in the family Aeshnidae, known as the Grampians darner. It is known only from the Grampians in western Victoria, Australia, where it inhabits small streams and bogs.

Austroaeschna ingrid is a very dark dragonfly with pale markings. It appears similar to the S-spot darner, Austroaeschna christine, the multi-spotted darner, Austroaeschna multipunctata, and the Sydney mountain darner, Austroaeschna obscura.

== Etymology ==
The genus name Austroaeschna combines the prefix austro- (from Latin auster, meaning “south wind”, hence “southern”) with Aeshna, a genus of dragonflies.

In 2008, Günther Theischinger named this species ingrid, honouring his granddaughter Ingrid.

== Gallery ==
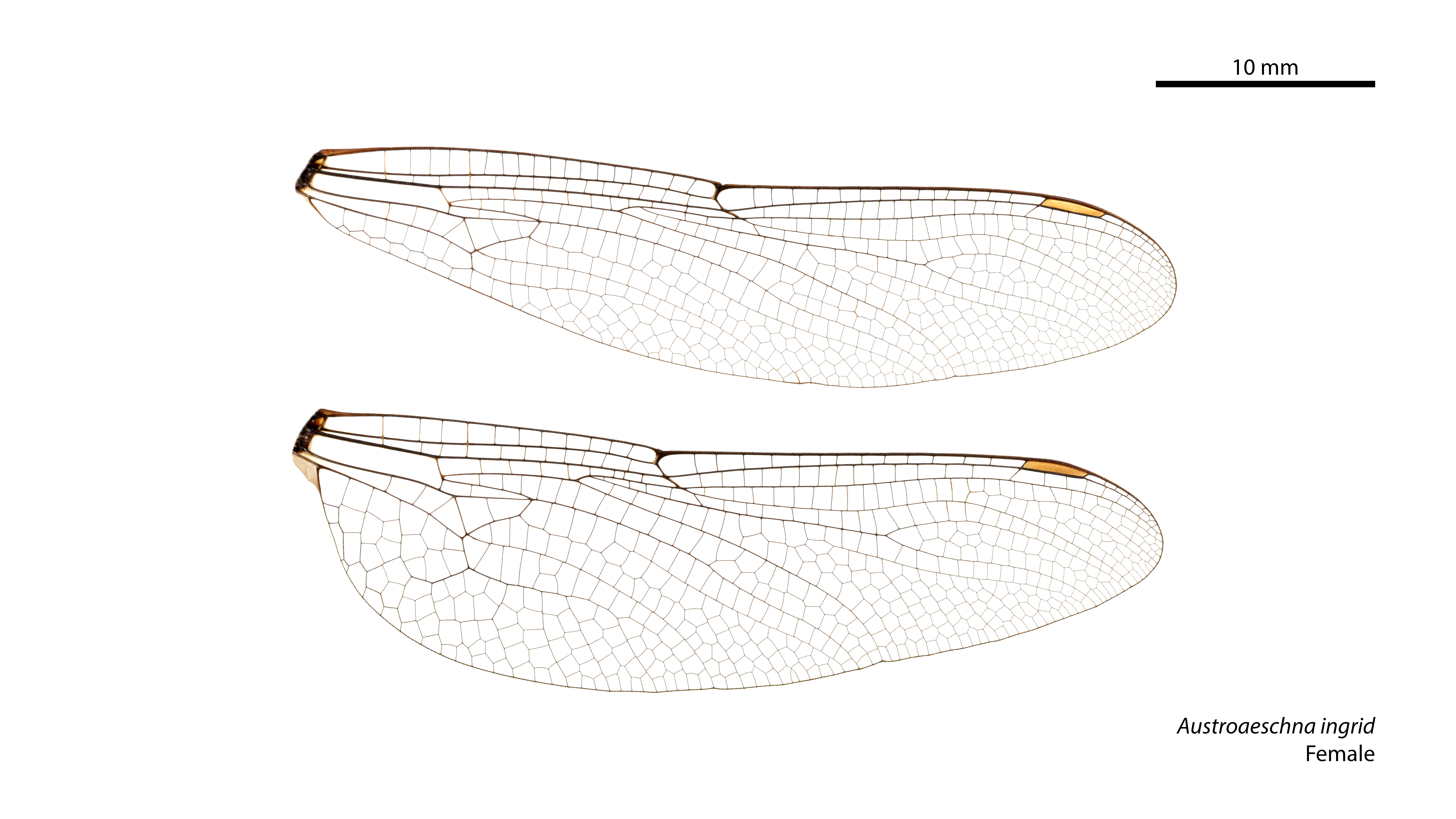
Female wings

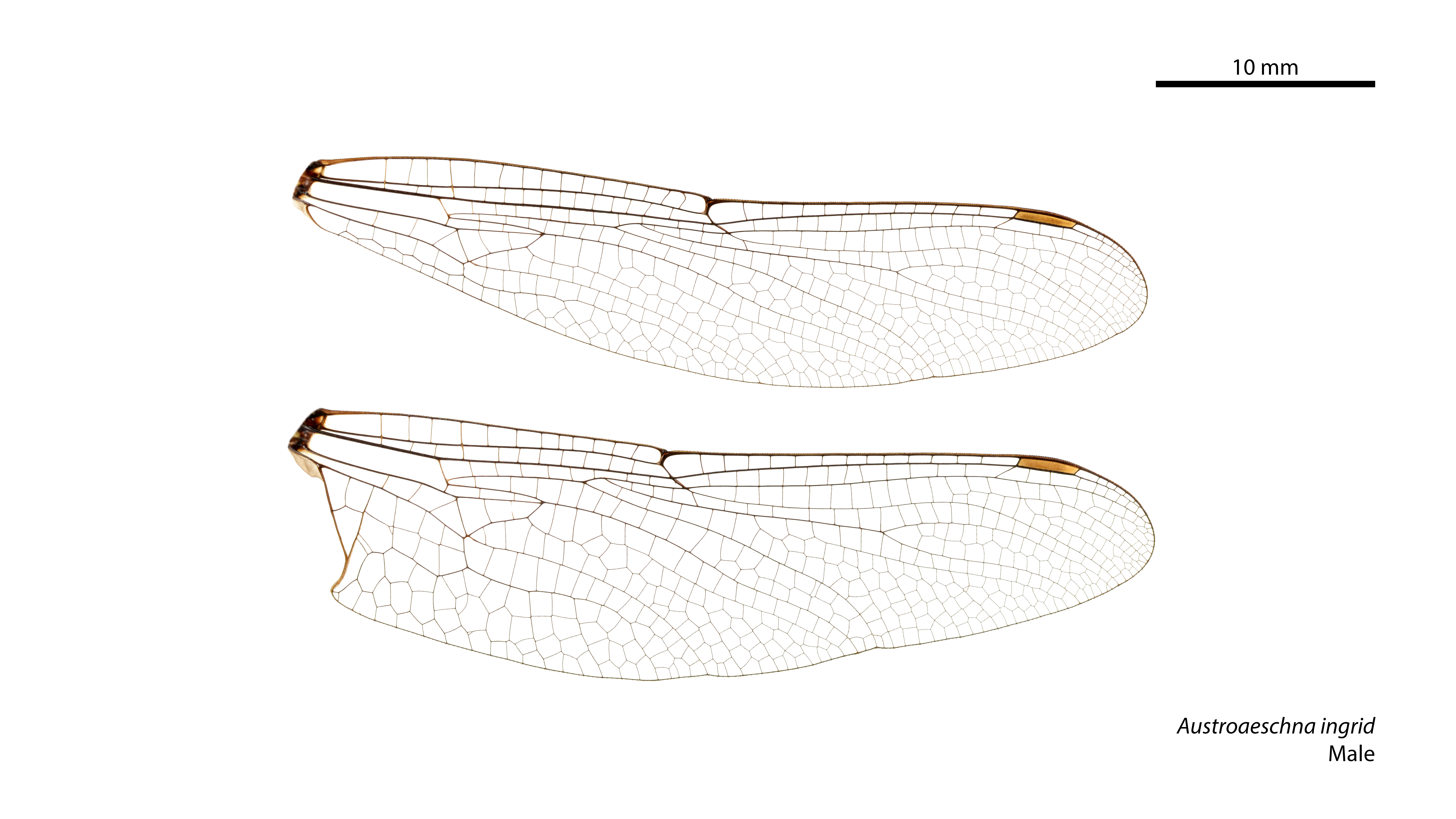
Male wings

== See also ==
- List of dragonflies of Australia
