= Telephlebiidae =

Scientific classification
- Kingdom: Animalia
- Phylum: Arthropoda
- Clade: Pancrustacea
- Class: Insecta
- Order: Odonata
- Infraorder: Anisoptera
- Superfamily: Aeshnoidea
- Family: Telephlebiidae; Cockerell, 1913

Historical grouping of damselflies

Telephlebiidae was once regarded as a separate family of dragonflies that were endemic to eastern and south-western Australia. However, recent taxonomic revisions have resulted in the classification of species that were previously placed in Telephlebiidae to now be part of the family Aeshnidae.

== Taxonomy ==
The family Telephlebiidae was previously recognized as an independent family within the order Odonata. However, recent research and taxonomic updates have integrated the species that were once categorized under Telephlebiidae into the family Aeshnidae. Consequently, the family Telephlebiidae is now considered unnecessary.

Species that were part of Telephlebiidae are now acknowledged in both the Australian Faunal Directory and the World Odonata List maintained at the Slater Museum of Natural History, and they are classified as members of the Aeshnidae family.

== Genera ==
The family included the following genera:

- Acanthaeschna Selys, 1883
- Antipodophlebia Fraser, 1960
- Austroaeschna Selys, 1883
- Austrophlebia Tillyard, 1916
- Dromaeschna Förster, 1908
- Notoaeschna Tillyard, 1916
- Spinaeschna Theischinger, 1982
- Telephlebia Selys, 1883
