= Austroaeschna christine =

S-spot darner

Scientific classification
- Kingdom: Animalia
- Phylum: Arthropoda
- Clade: Pancrustacea
- Class: Insecta
- Order: Odonata
- Suborder: Anisoptera
- Family: Aeshnidae
- Genus: Austroaeschna
- Species: A. christine

Binomial name
- Austroaeschna christine Theischinger, 1993

Species of dragonfly

Austroaeschna christine is a species of large dragonfly in the family Aeshnidae, known as the S-spot darner. It is found in the vicinity of Eungella National Park in North Queensland, Australia, where it inhabits the upper reaches of small streams.

Austroaeschna christine is a dark dragonfly with pale markings. It appears similar to the sigma darner, Austroaeschna sigma, which is found in mountainous areas of northern New South Wales and southern Queensland and the multi-spotted darner, Austroaeschna multipunctata, which is found in the mountains of southern New South Wales and Victoria.

== Etymology ==
The genus name Austroaeschna combines the prefix austro- (from Latin auster, meaning “south wind”, hence “southern”) with Aeshna, a genus of dragonflies.

In 1993, Günther Theischinger named this species christine, an eponym honouring his wife Christine.

== See also ==
- List of dragonflies of Australia
