= Austroaeschna subapicalis =

Conehead darner

Conservation status
- Least Concern (IUCN 3.1)

Scientific classification
- Kingdom: Animalia
- Phylum: Arthropoda
- Clade: Pancrustacea
- Class: Insecta
- Order: Odonata
- Suborder: Anisoptera
- Family: Aeshnidae
- Genus: Austroaeschna
- Species: A. subapicalis

Binomial name
- Austroaeschna subapicalis Theischinger, 1982

Species of dragonfly

Austroaeschna subapicalis is a species of large dragonfly in the family Aeshnidae, known commonly as the conehead darner. It inhabits mountain streams in New South Wales and Victoria, Australia.

Austroaeschna subapicalis is a very dark dragonfly with indistinct pale markings. It appears similar to the mountain darner, Austroaeschna atrata, which is found in alpine areas of southern New South Wales and Victoria.

== Etymology ==
The genus name Austroaeschna combines the prefix austro- (from Latin auster, meaning “south wind”, hence “southern”) with Aeshna, a genus of dragonflies.

The species name subapicalis is derived from the Latin sub ("under" or "beneath") and apicalis ("at the tip"), referring to teeth located well short of the end of the male appendage.

== Gallery ==
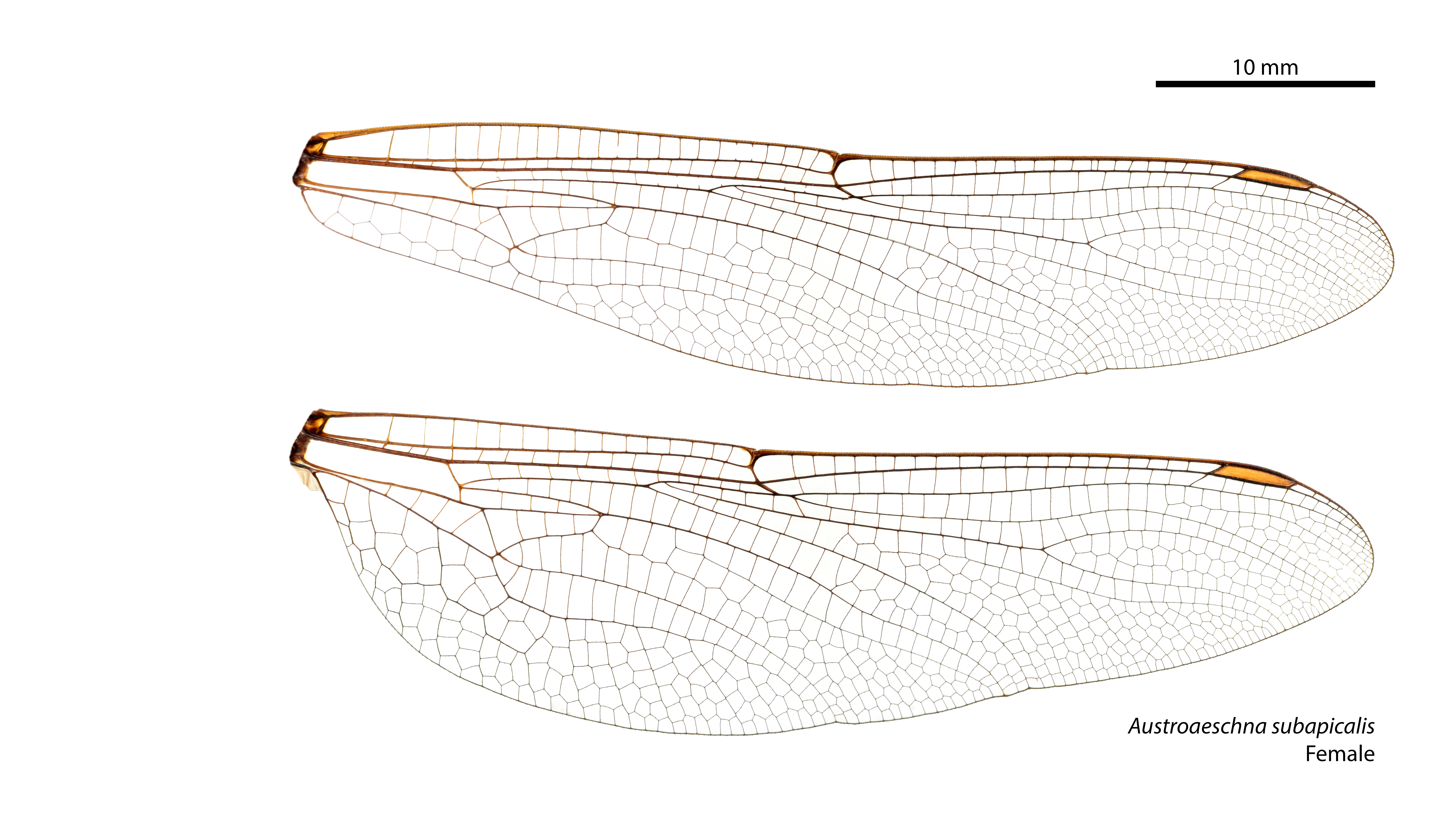
Female wings

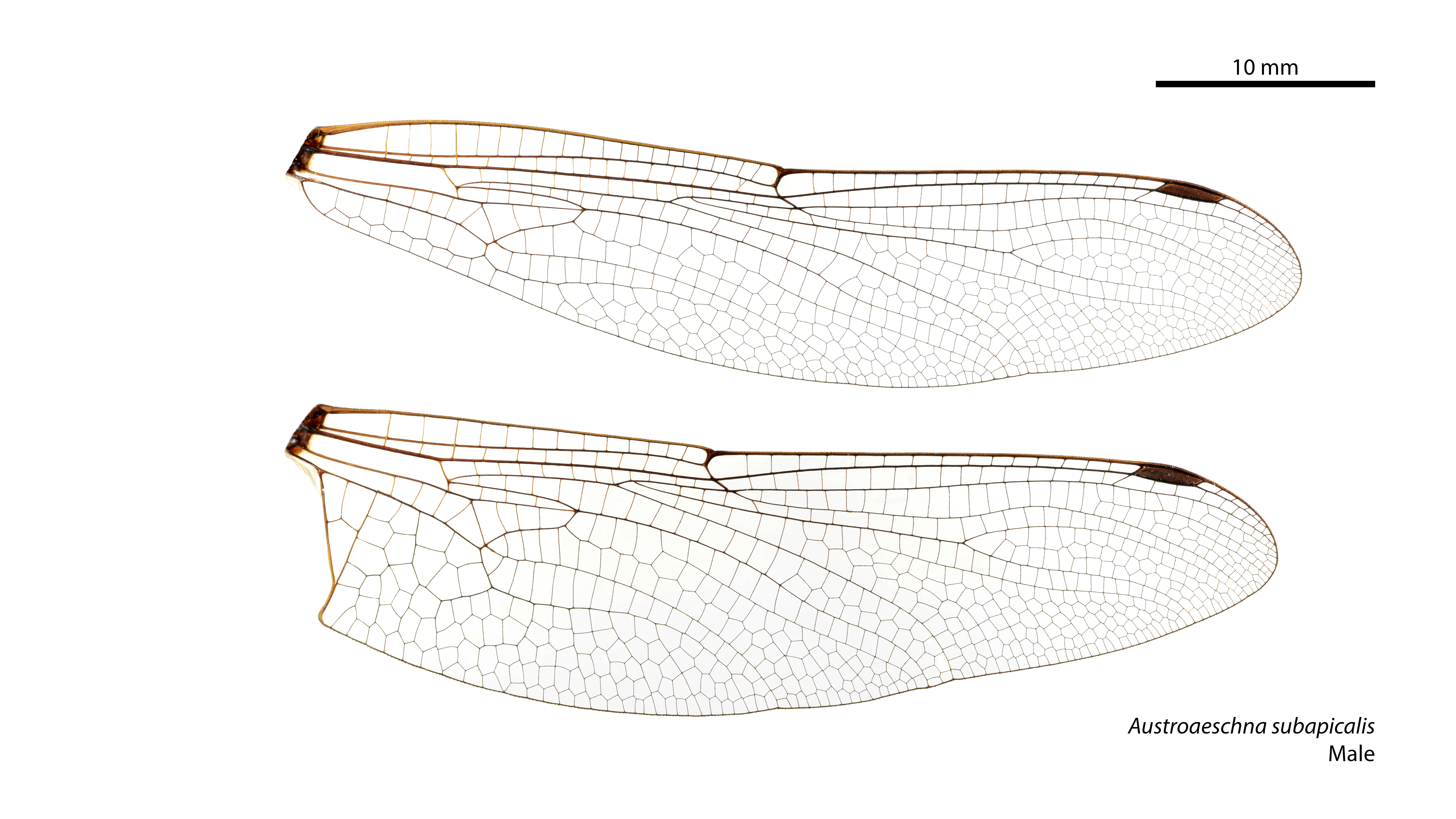
Male wings

== See also ==
- List of dragonflies of Australia
