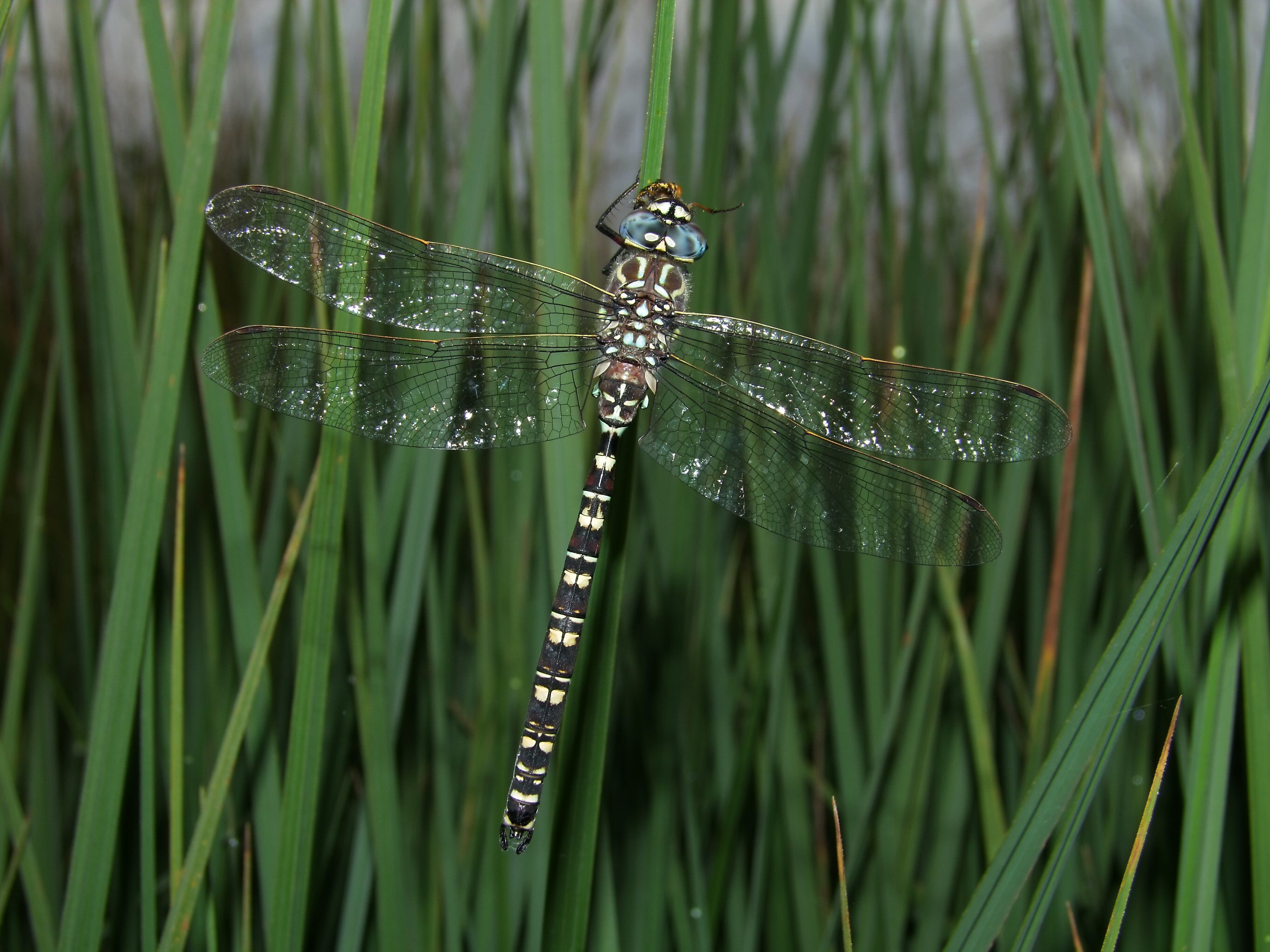
- Male Austroaeschna inermis

Conservation status
- Least Concern (IUCN 3.1)

Scientific classification
- Kingdom: Animalia
- Phylum: Arthropoda
- Clade: Pancrustacea
- Class: Insecta
- Order: Odonata
- Suborder: Anisoptera
- Family: Aeshnidae
- Genus: Austroaeschna
- Species: A. inermis

Binomial name
- Austroaeschna inermis Martin, 1901

= Austroaeschna inermis =

Whitewater darner

Species of dragonfly

Austroaeschna inermis is a species of large dragonfly in the family Telephlebiidae, known as the whitewater darner. It inhabits fast-flowing mountain streams in southern New South Wales and eastern Victoria, Australia.

Austroaeschna inermis is a brown or black dragonfly with pale blue markings. It appears similar to the more widespread unicorn darner, Austroaeschna unicornis, which is found in eastern Australia, from Brisbane to Tasmania and around Adelaide in South Australia.

== Etymology ==
The genus name Austroaeschna combines the prefix austro- (from Latin auster, meaning “south wind”, hence “southern”) with Aeshna, a genus of dragonflies.

The species name inermis is Latin for "unarmed", "without spines", referring to the absence of a spine on abdominal segment 10, in contrast to the otherwise similar Austroaeschna parvistigma.

== Gallery ==
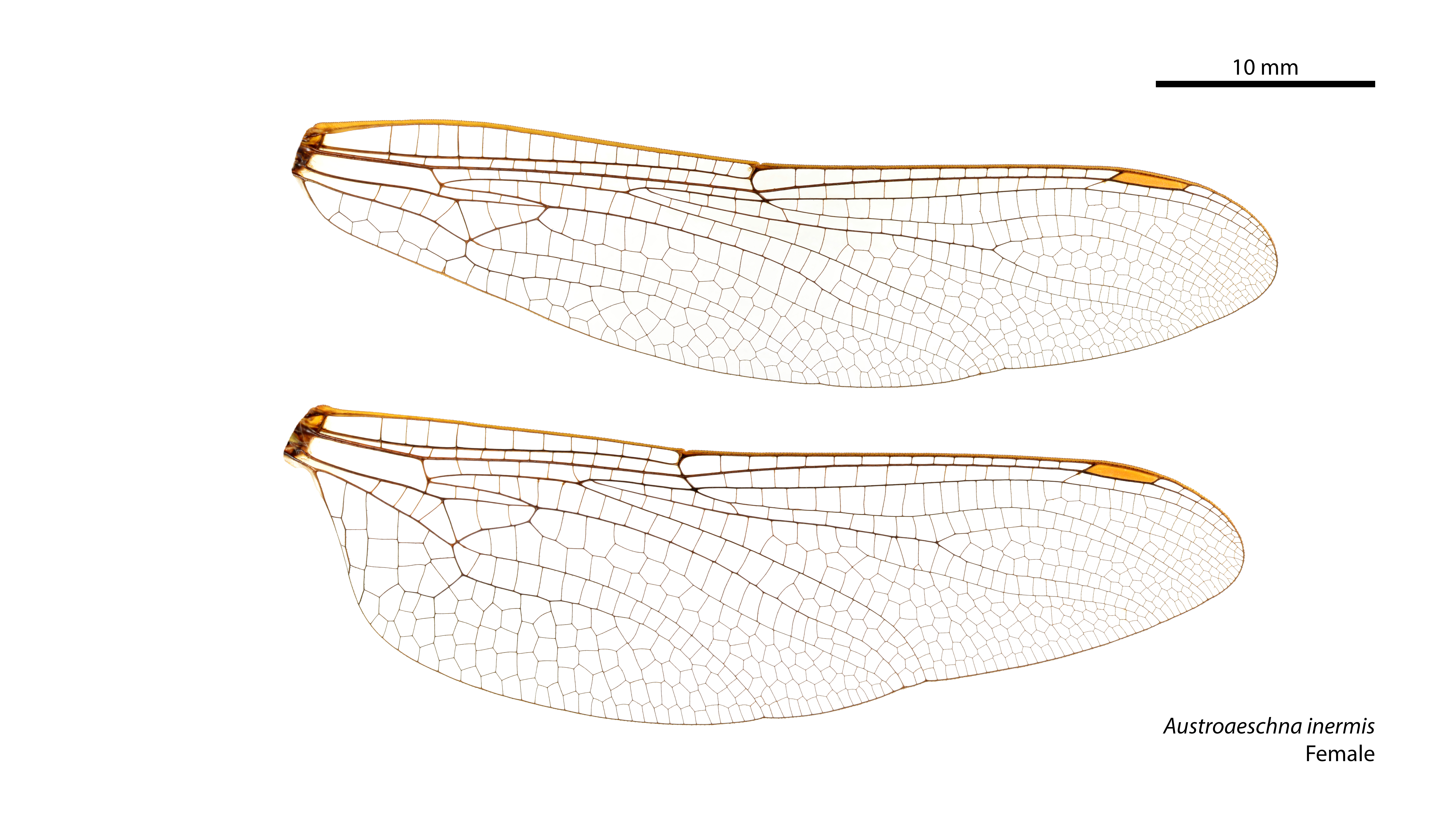
Female wings

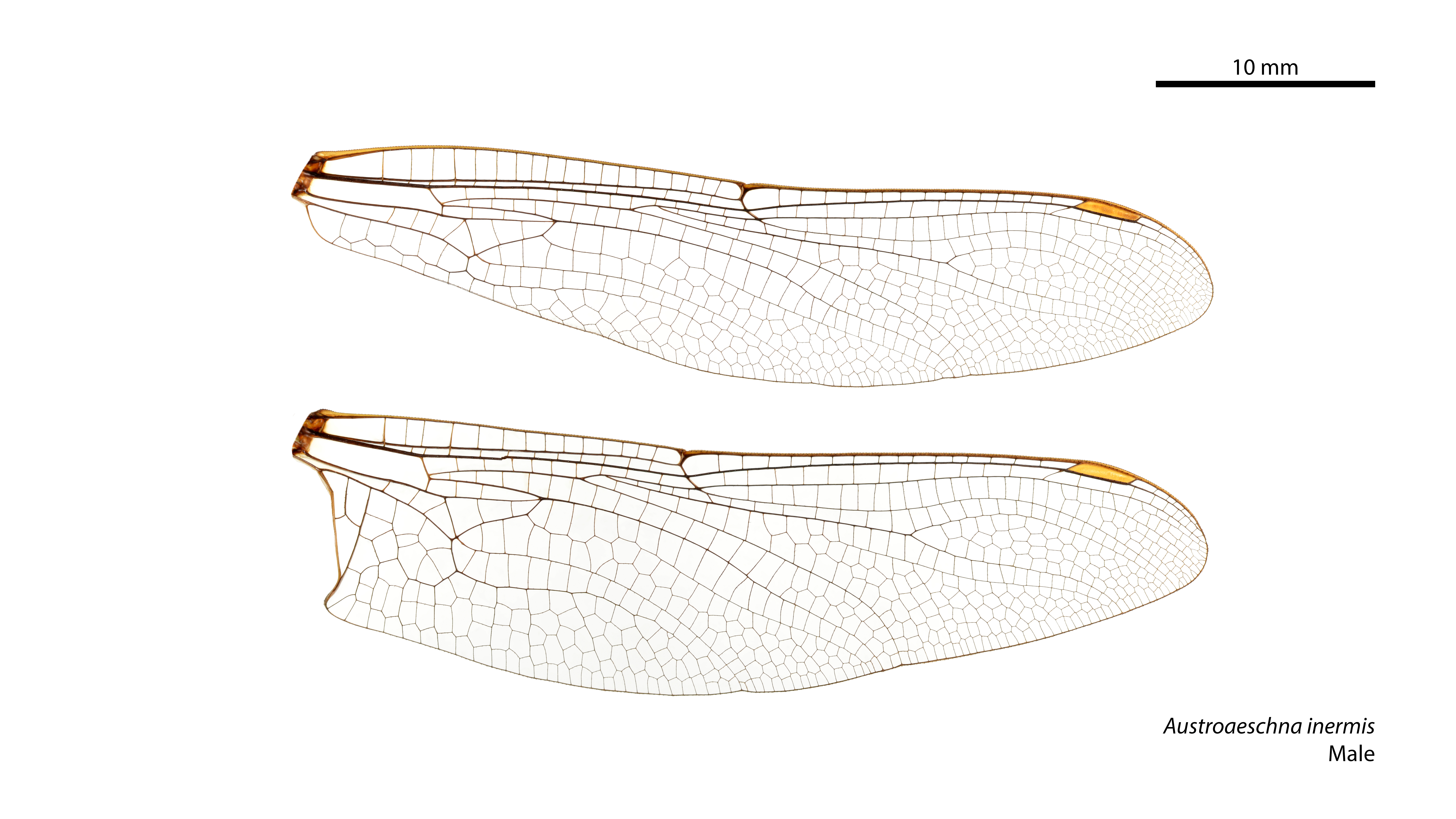
Male wings

== See also ==
- List of dragonflies of Australia
