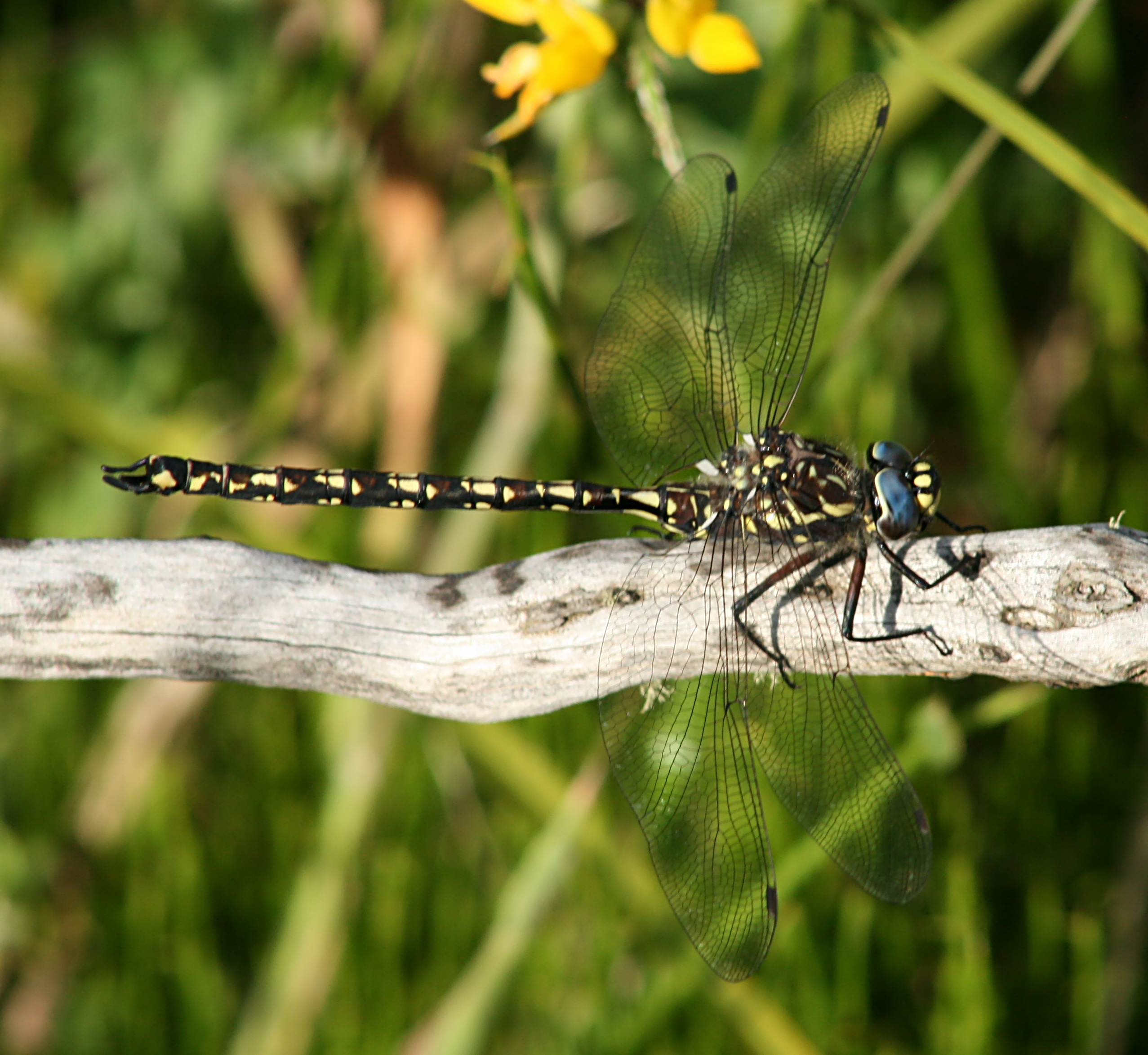
- Male

Conservation status
- Least Concern (IUCN 3.1)

Scientific classification
- Kingdom: Animalia
- Phylum: Arthropoda
- Clade: Pancrustacea
- Class: Insecta
- Order: Odonata
- Suborder: Anisoptera
- Family: Aeshnidae
- Genus: Austroaeschna
- Species: A. flavomaculata

Binomial name
- Austroaeschna flavomaculata Tillyard, 1916

= Alpine darner =

Species of dragonfly

The alpine darner, Austroaeschna flavomaculata, is a species of dragonfly in the family Aeshnidae, that is known to be present in the mountainous regions of New South Wales and Victoria, Australia. Although the male was first described in 1916, the female and larvae were not described until 1982.

Austroaeschna flavomaculata is a very dark dragonfly with pale markings. It appears similar to the multi-spotted darner, Austroaeschna multipunctata, which is found in small mountain streams in south-eastern Australia.

== Etymology ==
The genus name Austroaeschna combines the prefix austro- (from Latin auster, meaning “south wind”, hence “southern”) with Aeshna, a genus of dragonflies.

The species name flavomaculata is derived from the Latin flavus ("yellow") and macula ("spot" or "stain"), referring to yellow spots and streaks on the thorax and abdomen.

== Gallery ==
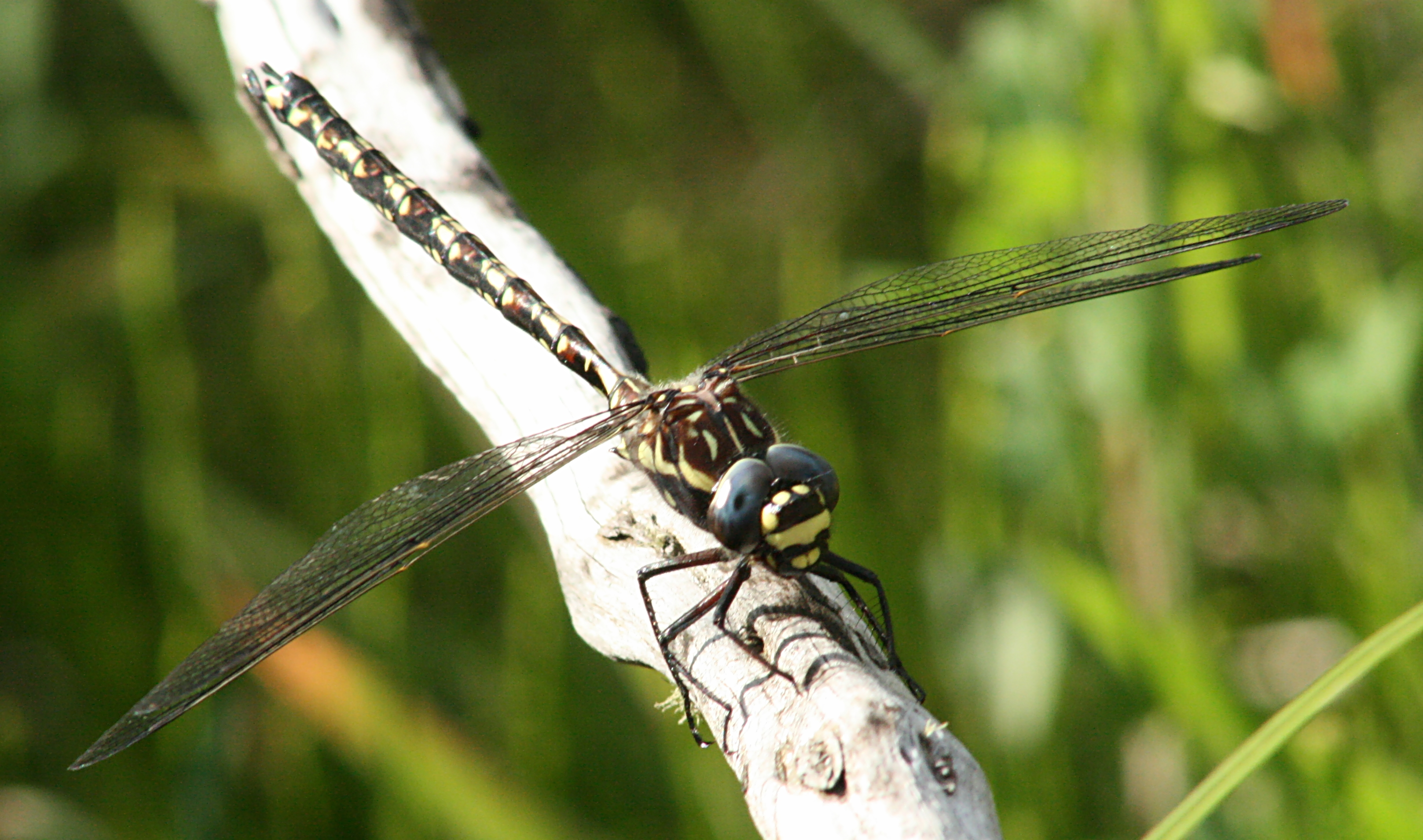
Front view of a male

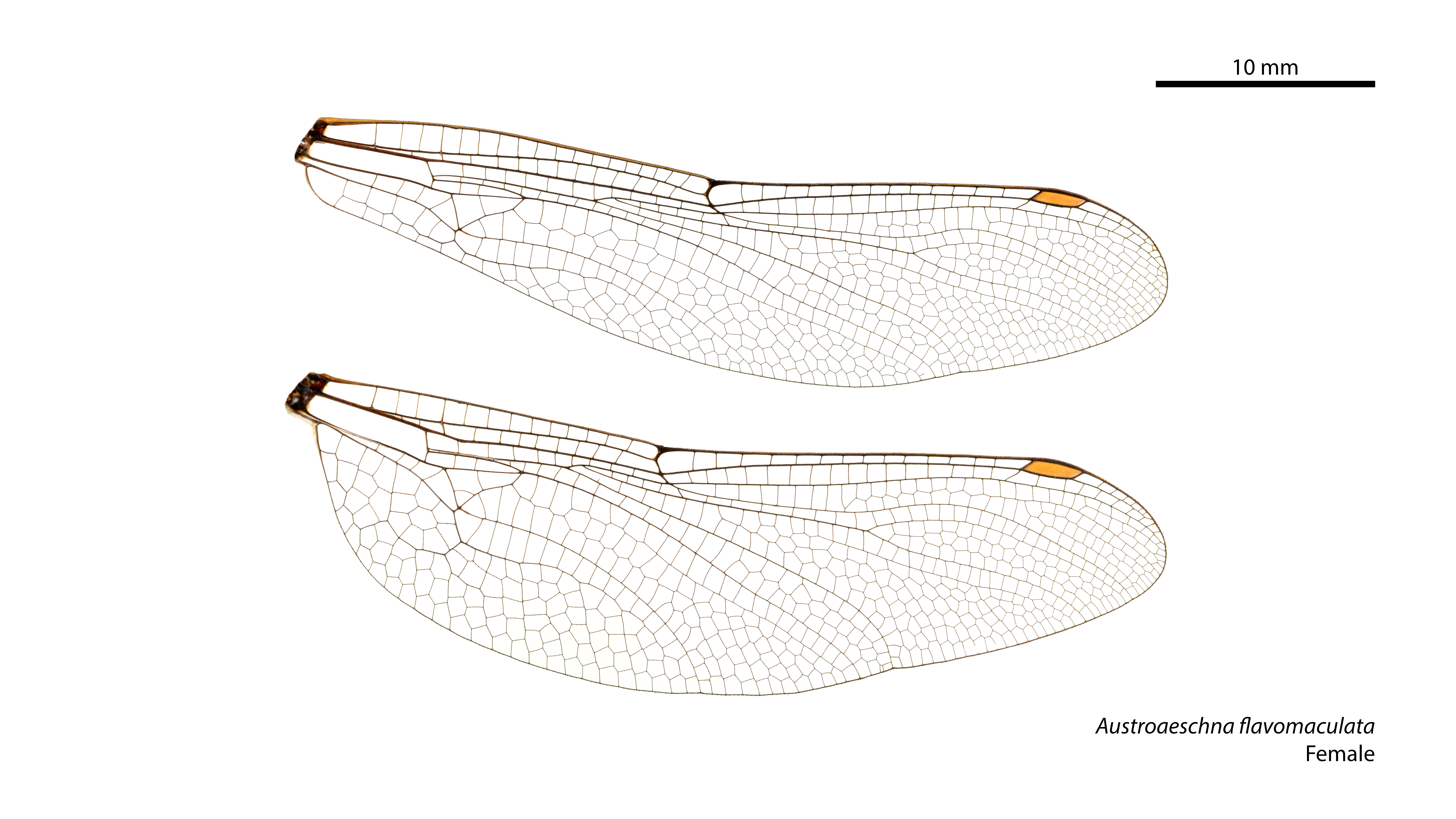
Female wings

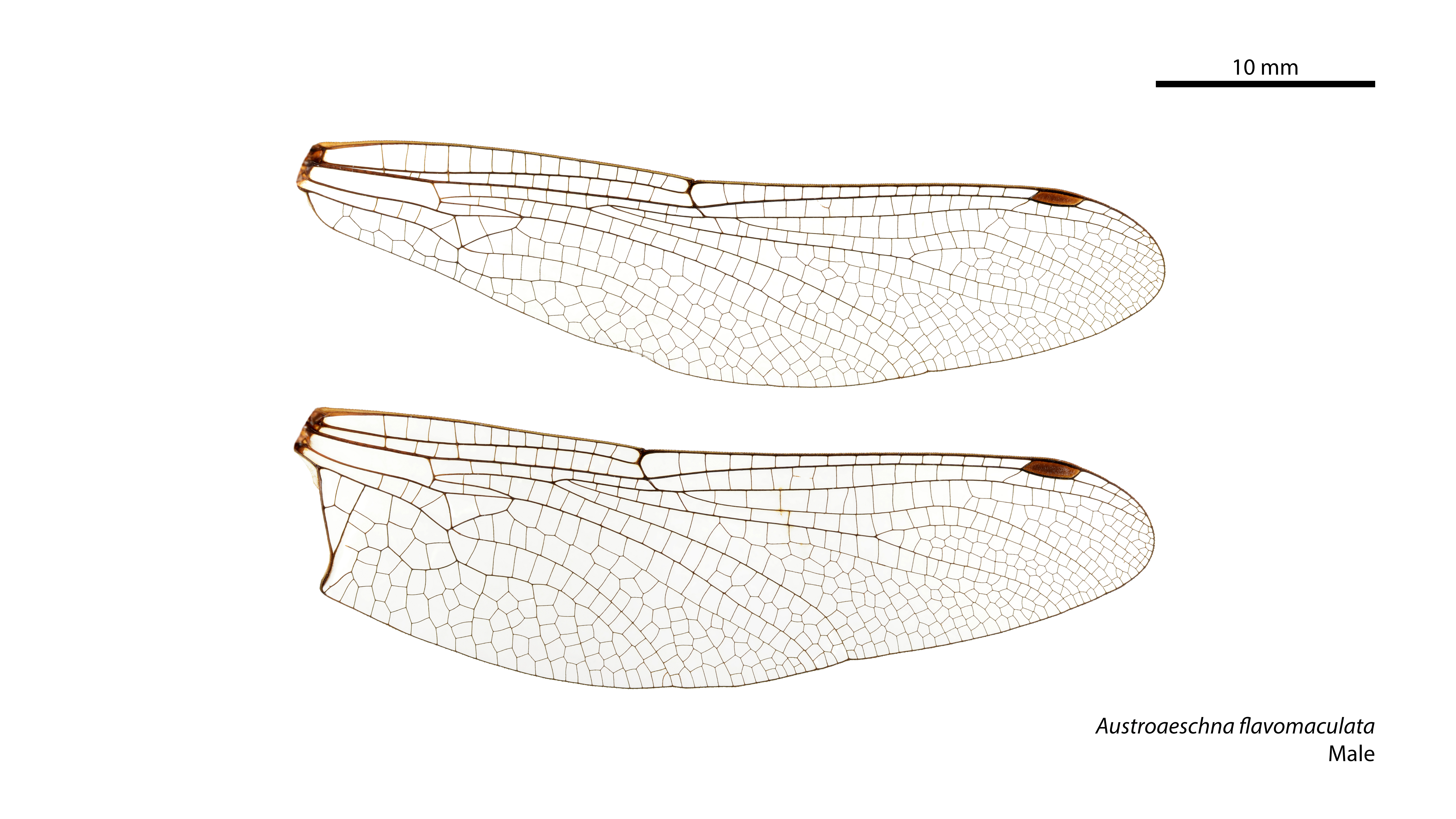
Male wings
