= Austroaeschna eungella =

Eungella darner

Scientific classification
- Kingdom: Animalia
- Phylum: Arthropoda
- Clade: Pancrustacea
- Class: Insecta
- Order: Odonata
- Suborder: Anisoptera
- Family: Aeshnidae
- Genus: Austroaeschna
- Species: A. eungella

Binomial name
- Austroaeschna eungella Theischinger, 1993

Species of dragonfly

Austroaeschna eungella is a species of dragonfly in the family Aeshnidae, known as the Eungella darner. It is found in the vicinity of Eungella National Park in North Queensland, Australia, where it inhabits rocky streams in the rainforest.

Austroaeschna eungella is a black or brown dragonfly with pale markings. It resembles the dark forest darner, Austroaeschna pulchra, which is found further south from near Brisbane through to Victoria.

== Etymology ==
The genus name Austroaeschna combines the prefix austro- (from Latin auster, meaning “south wind”, hence “southern”) with Aeshna, a genus of dragonflies.

The species name eungella refers to Eungella, in northern Queensland, where the species was first recorded.

== Gallery ==
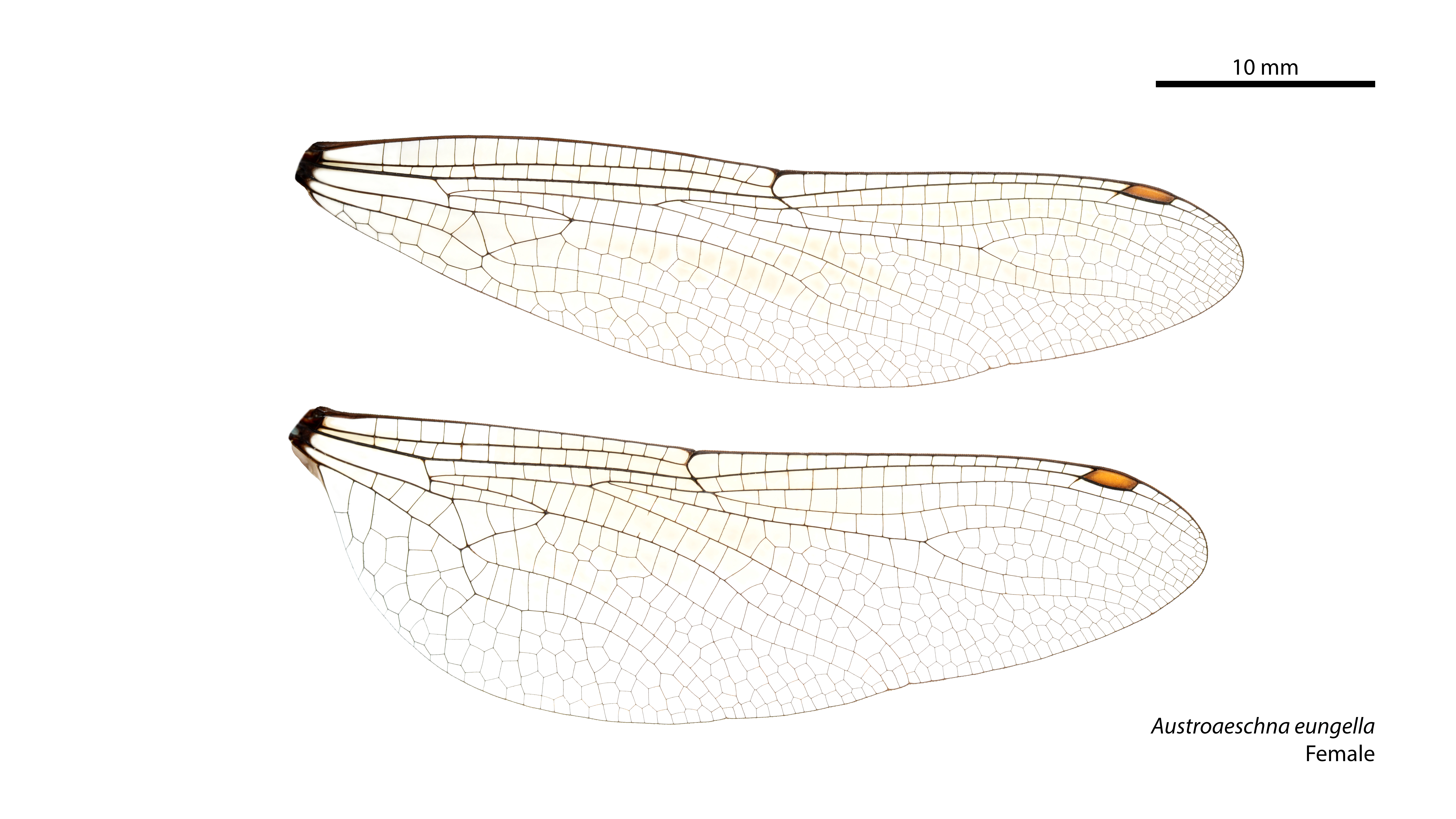
Female wings

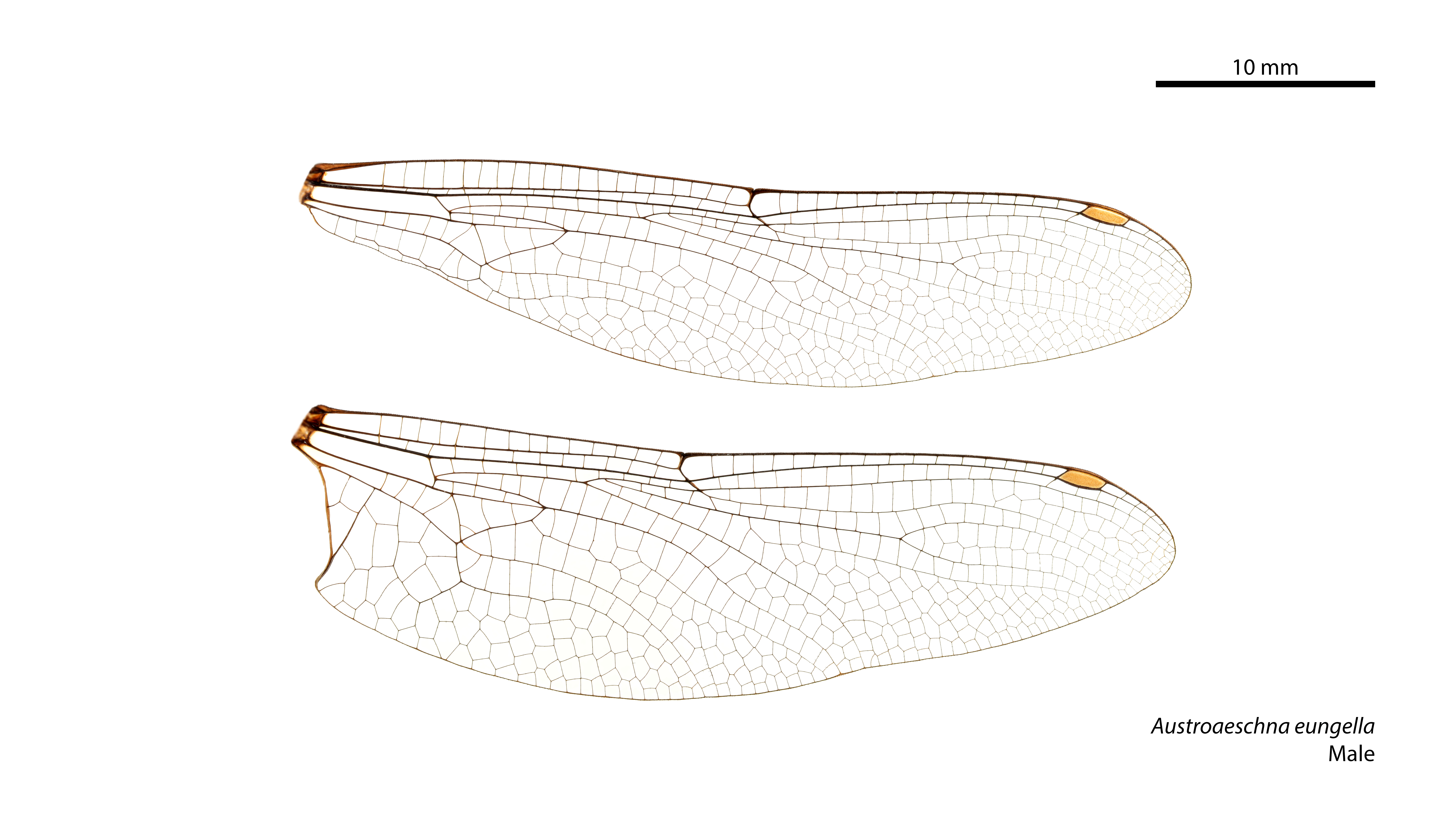
Male wings

== See also ==
- List of dragonflies of Australia
