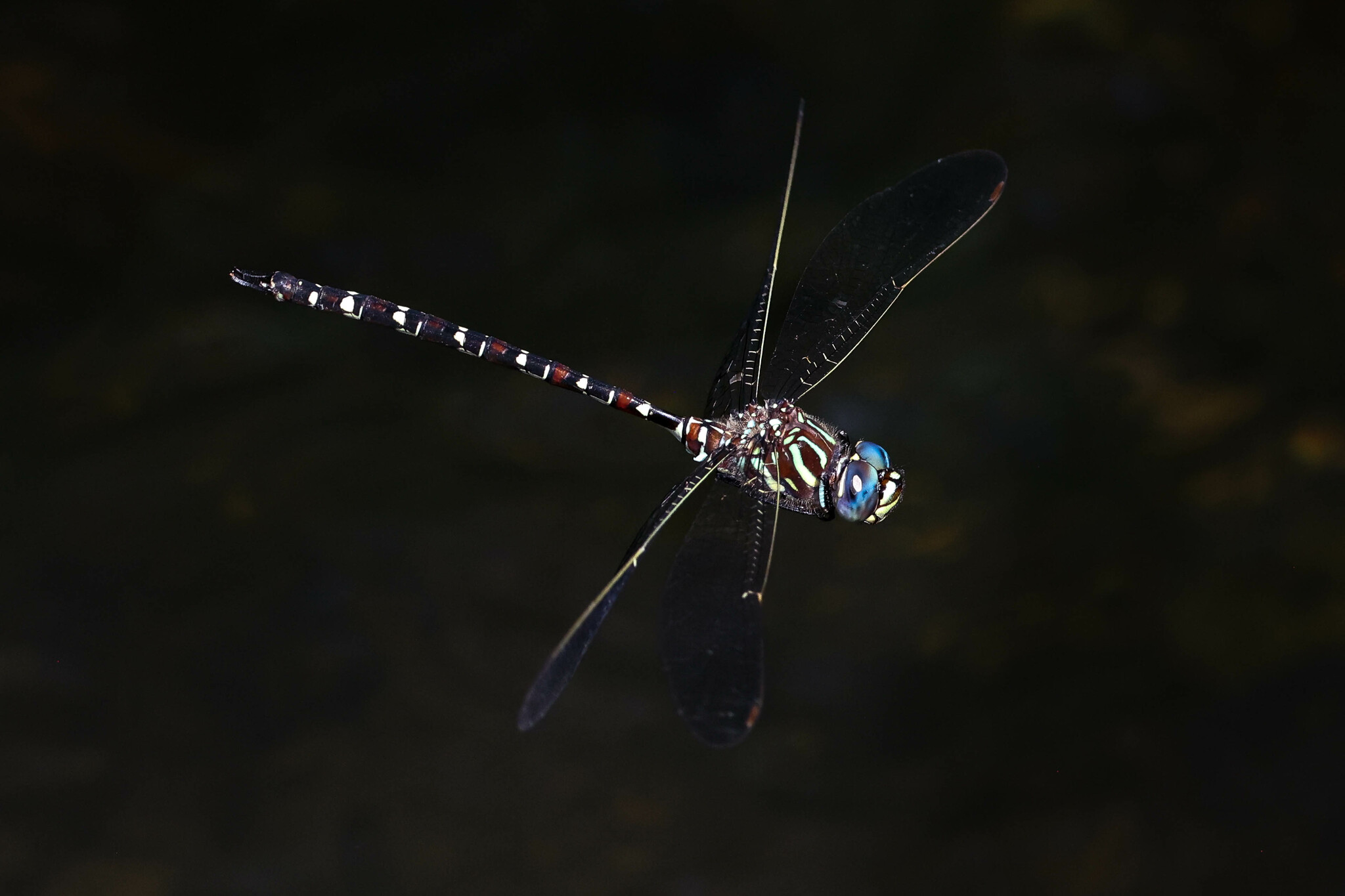
- Male

Conservation status
- Least Concern (IUCN 3.1)

Scientific classification
- Kingdom: Animalia
- Phylum: Arthropoda
- Clade: Pancrustacea
- Class: Insecta
- Order: Odonata
- Suborder: Anisoptera
- Family: Aeshnidae
- Genus: Austroaeschna
- Species: A. pinheyi

Binomial name
- Austroaeschna pinheyi Theischinger, 2001

Synonyms
- Austroaeschna unicornis pinheyi Theischinger, 2001

= Austroaeschna pinheyi =

Inland darner

Species of dragonfly

Austroaeschna pinheyi is a species of Australian dragonfly in the family Aeshnidae, known as an inland darner. It is found in south-eastern Queensland, where it inhabits streams in sclerophyll forest.

Austroaeschna pinheyi is a shorter-bodied, blackish dragonfly with pale markings.

== Taxonomy ==
Austroaeschna pinheyi was originally described as a subspecies of Austroaeschna unicornis. In 2001, Günther Theischinger reviewed variation within Austroaeschna unicornis across Queensland and New South Wales and recognised south-eastern Queensland populations as a distinct subspecies, Austroaeschna unicornis pinheyi, based on consistent differences in form and distribution.

Subsequent authors have treated pinheyi as a distinct species, and it is currently recognised as Austroaeschna pinheyi in authoritative checklists, including the World Odonata List and the Australian Faunal Directory.

== Distribution ==
Austroaeschna pinheyi is found in south-eastern Queensland, where it occurs in the vicinity of Carnarvon National Park, south of Emerald, and greater Brisbane away from the coast. The species inhabits streams in sclerophyll forest. In the southern part of its range, Austroaeschna pinheyi occurs in contact with Austroaeschna unicornis.

== Etymology ==
The genus name Austroaeschna combines the prefix austro- (from Latin auster, meaning “south wind”, hence “southern”) with Aeshna, a genus of dragonflies.

In 2001, Günther Theischinger named this species pinheyi, an eponym honouring his late colleague Elliot Pinhey (1910–1999), an entomologist who made major contributions to the study of dragonflies and other insects.

== Gallery ==
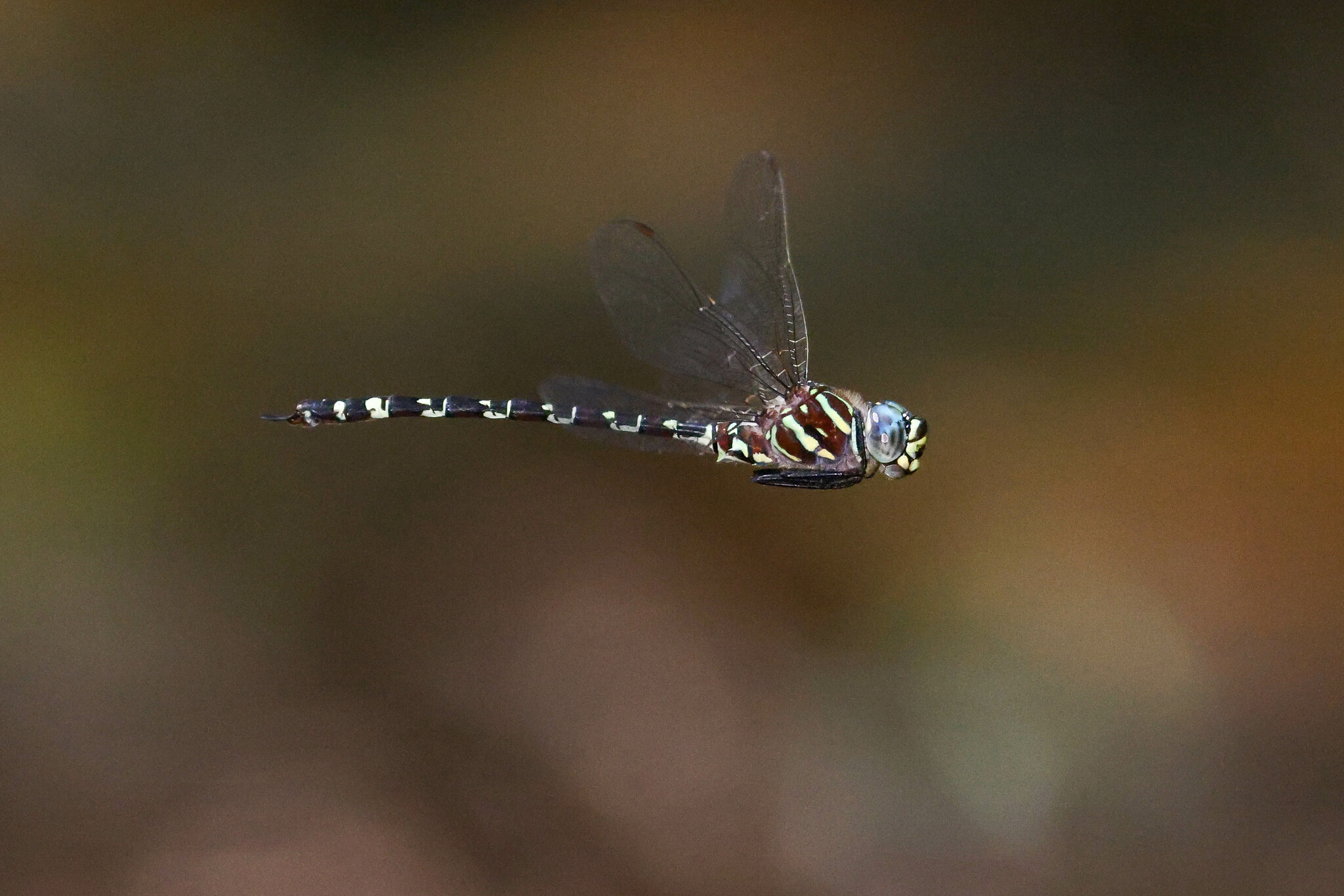
Male

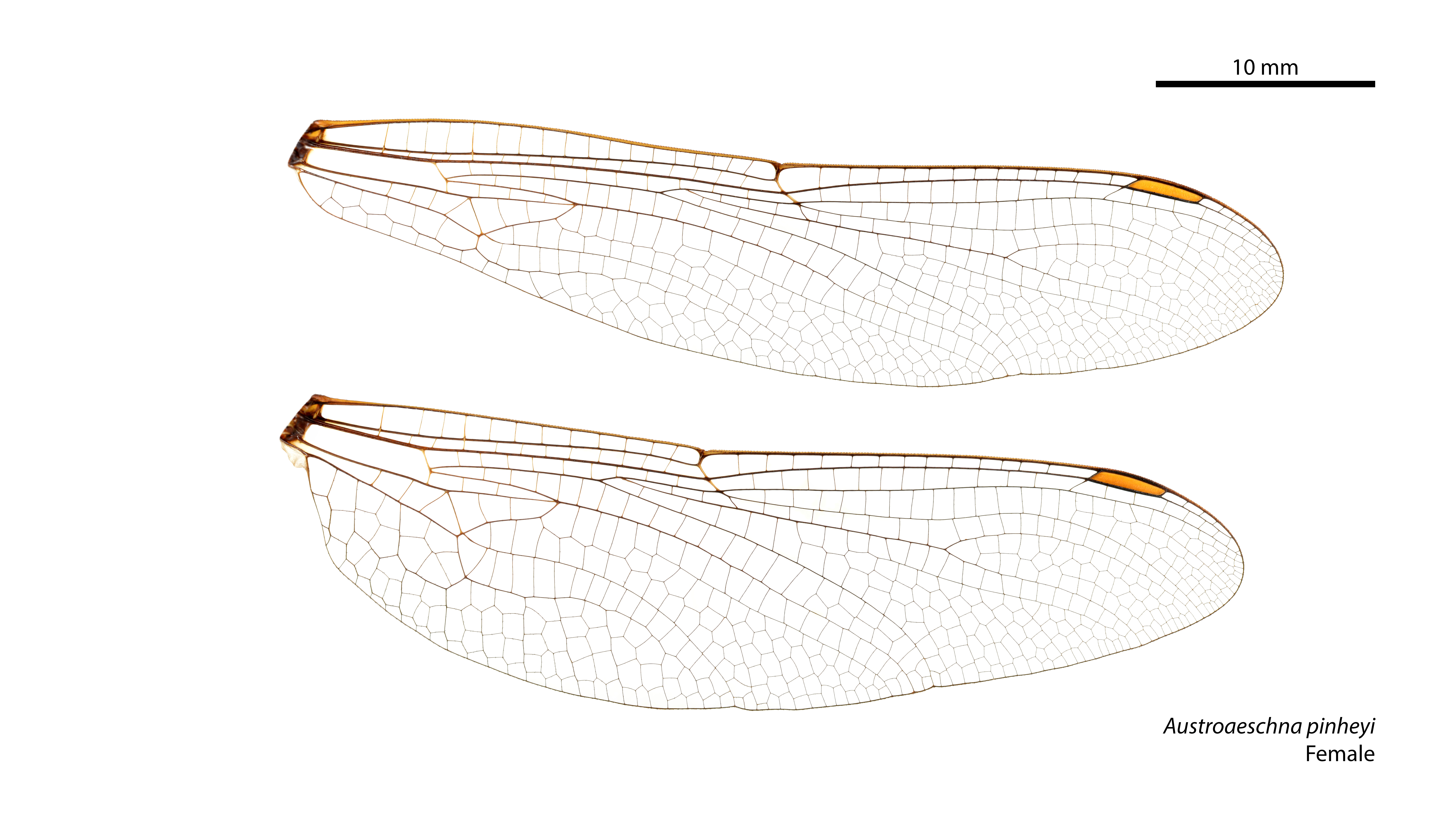
Female wings

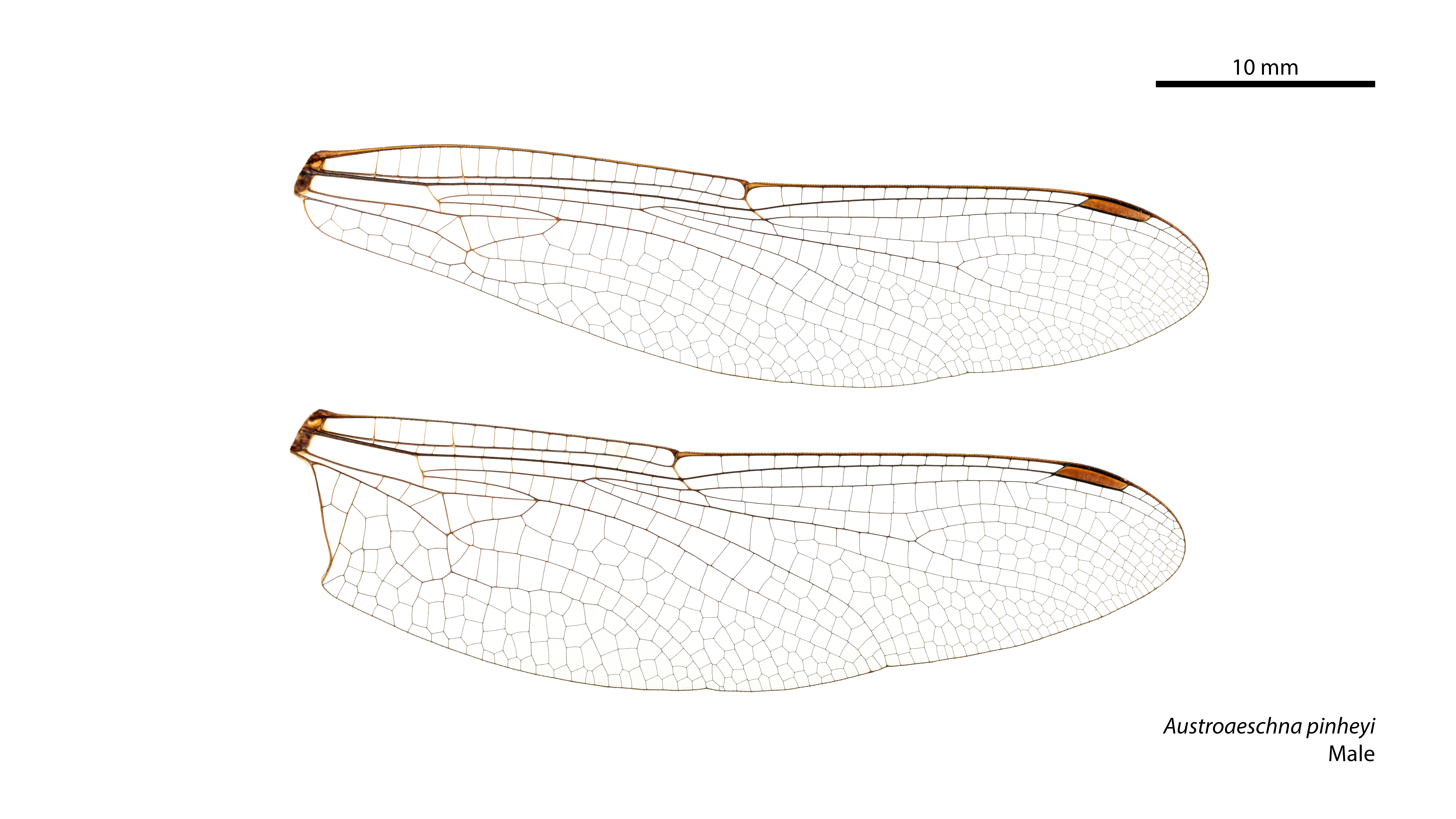
Male wings

== See also ==
- List of dragonflies of Australia
