= Austroaeschna pulchra =

Forest darner

Conservation status
- Least Concern (IUCN 3.1)

Scientific classification
- Kingdom: Animalia
- Phylum: Arthropoda
- Clade: Pancrustacea
- Class: Insecta
- Order: Odonata
- Suborder: Anisoptera
- Family: Aeshnidae
- Genus: Austroaeschna
- Species: A. pulchra

Binomial name
- Austroaeschna pulchra Tillyard, 1909

Species of dragonfly

Austroaeschna pulchra is a species of large dragonfly in the family Aeshnidae, known as the forest darner. It inhabits streams and rivers in eastern Australia, from around Brisbane through to Victoria.

The male Austroaeschna pulchra is a brown to black dragonfly with yellow, green or blue markings; while the female is brown with yellow markings. They appear similar to the Carnarvon darner, Austroaeschna muelleri.

== Etymology ==
The genus name Austroaeschna combines the prefix austro- (from Latin auster, meaning “south wind”, hence “southern”) with Aeshna, a genus of dragonflies.

The species name pulchra is derived from the Latin pulcher ("beautiful"), likely referring to a marking on the abdomen.

== Gallery ==
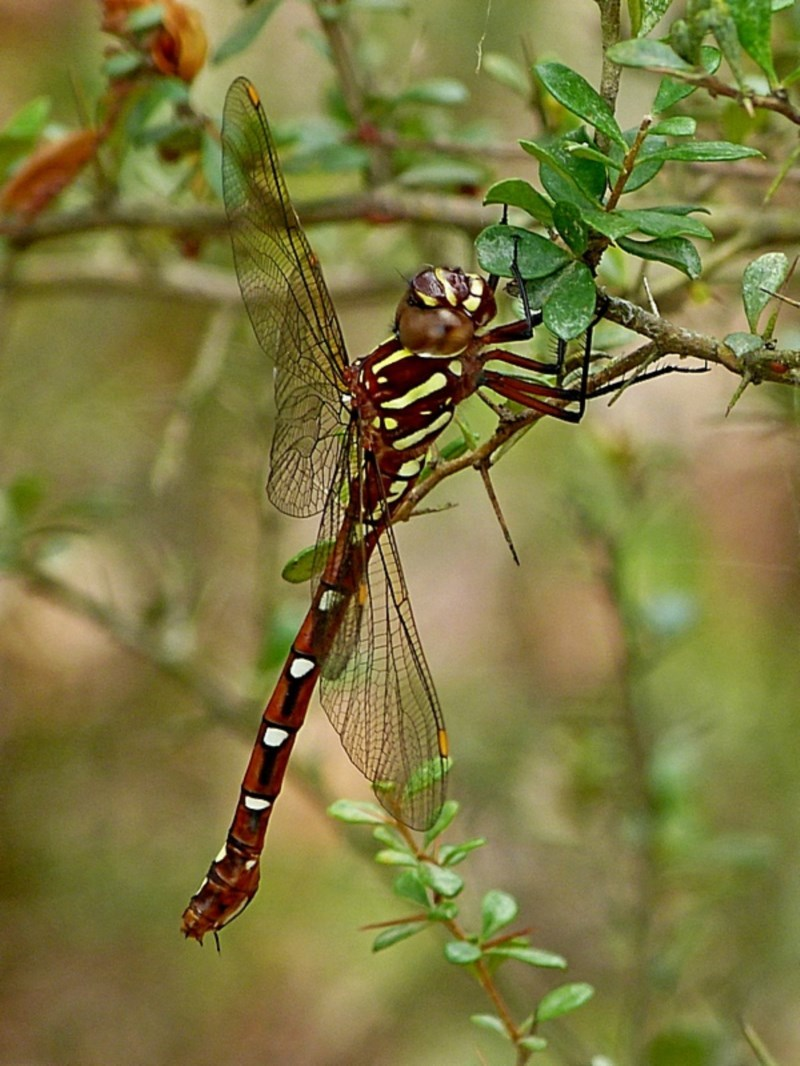
Female

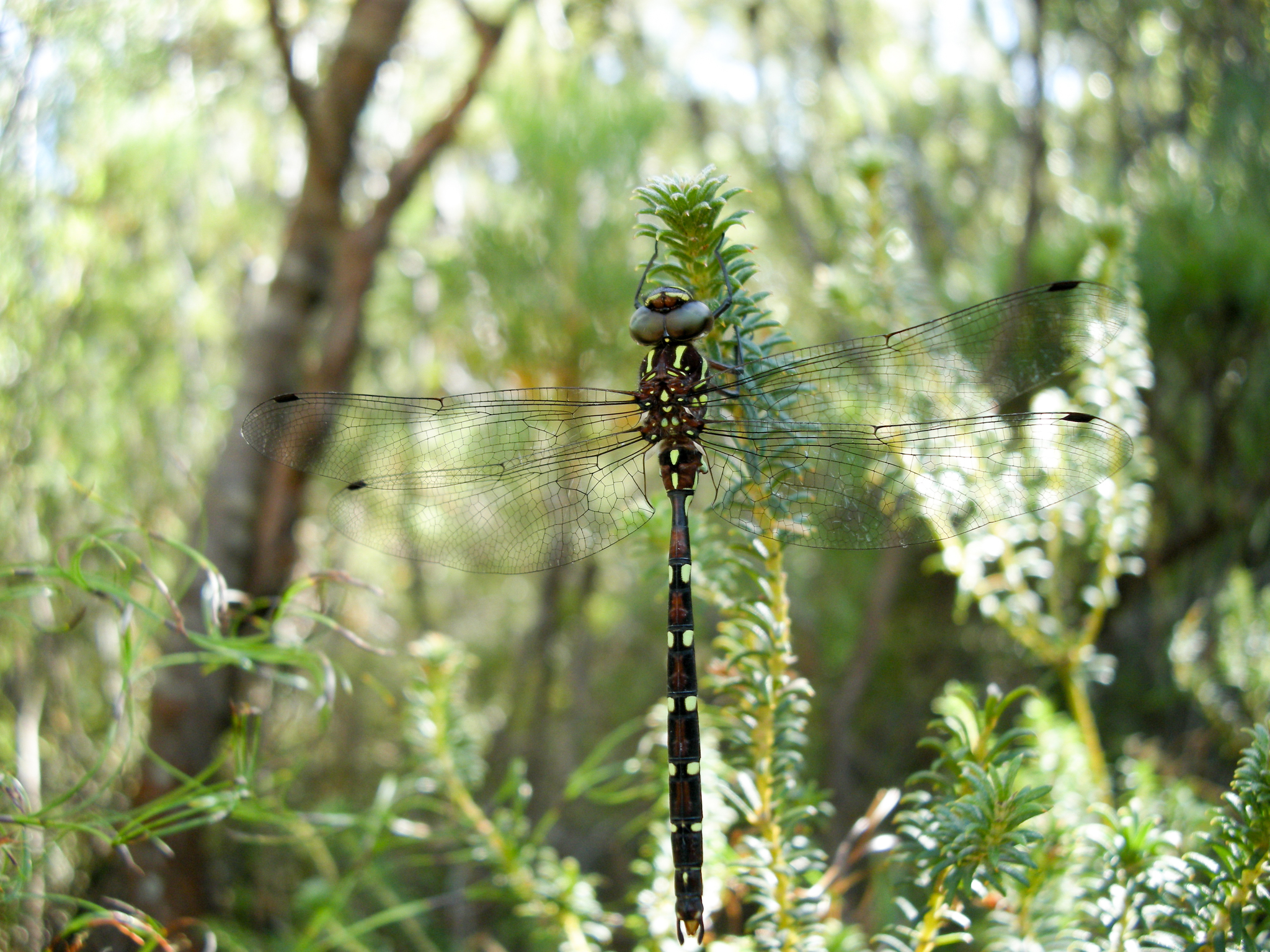
Male

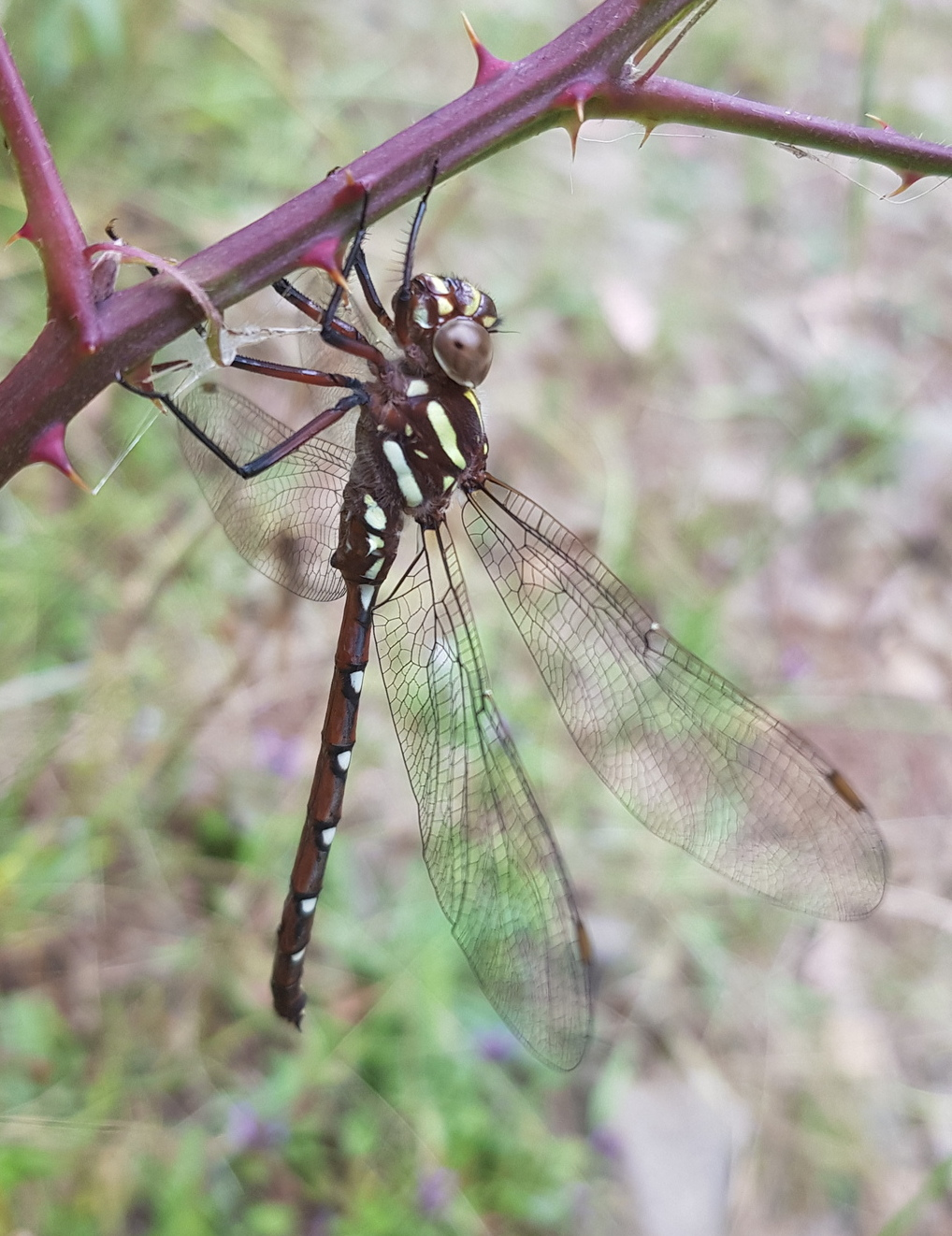
Male

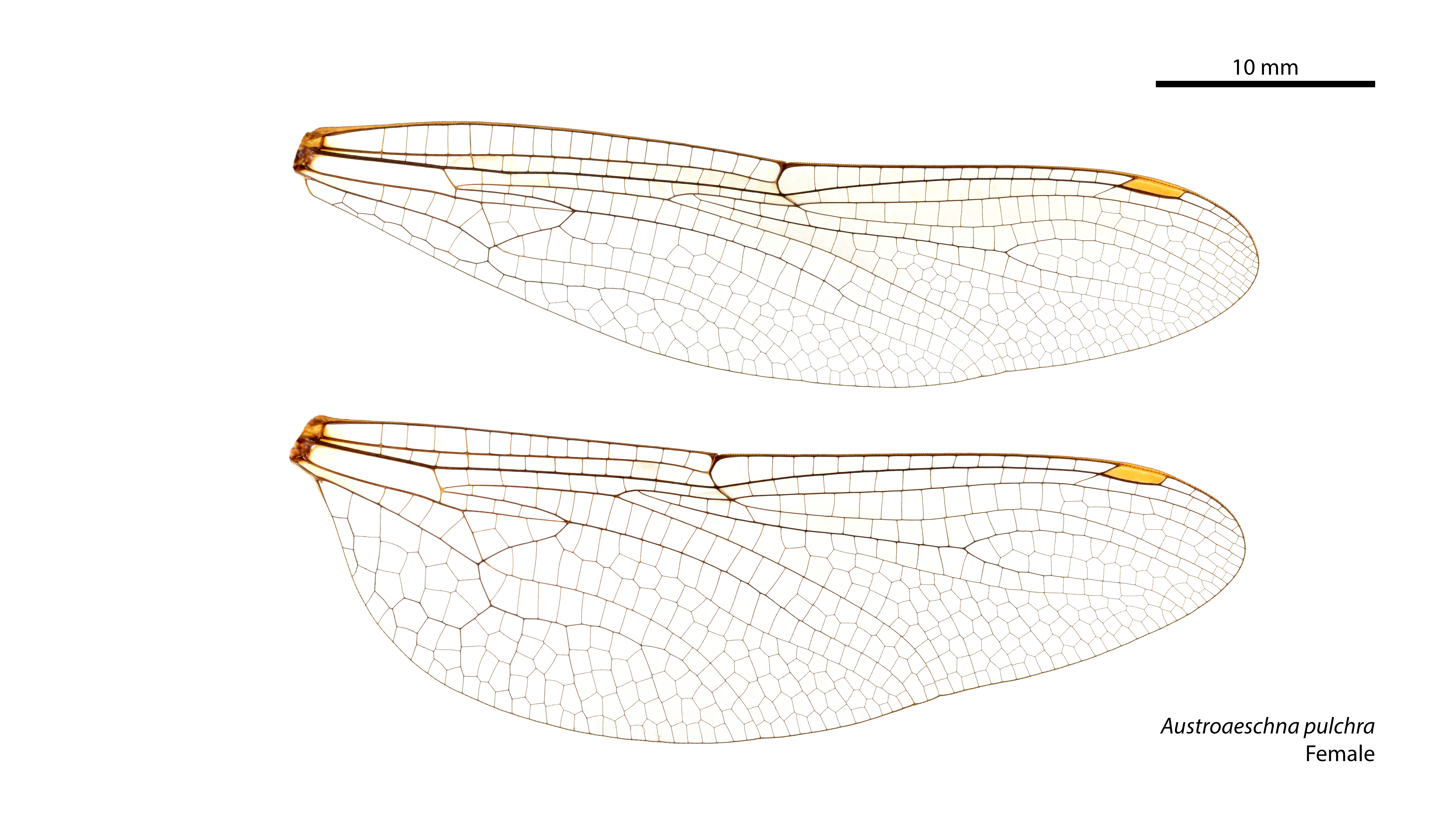
Female wings

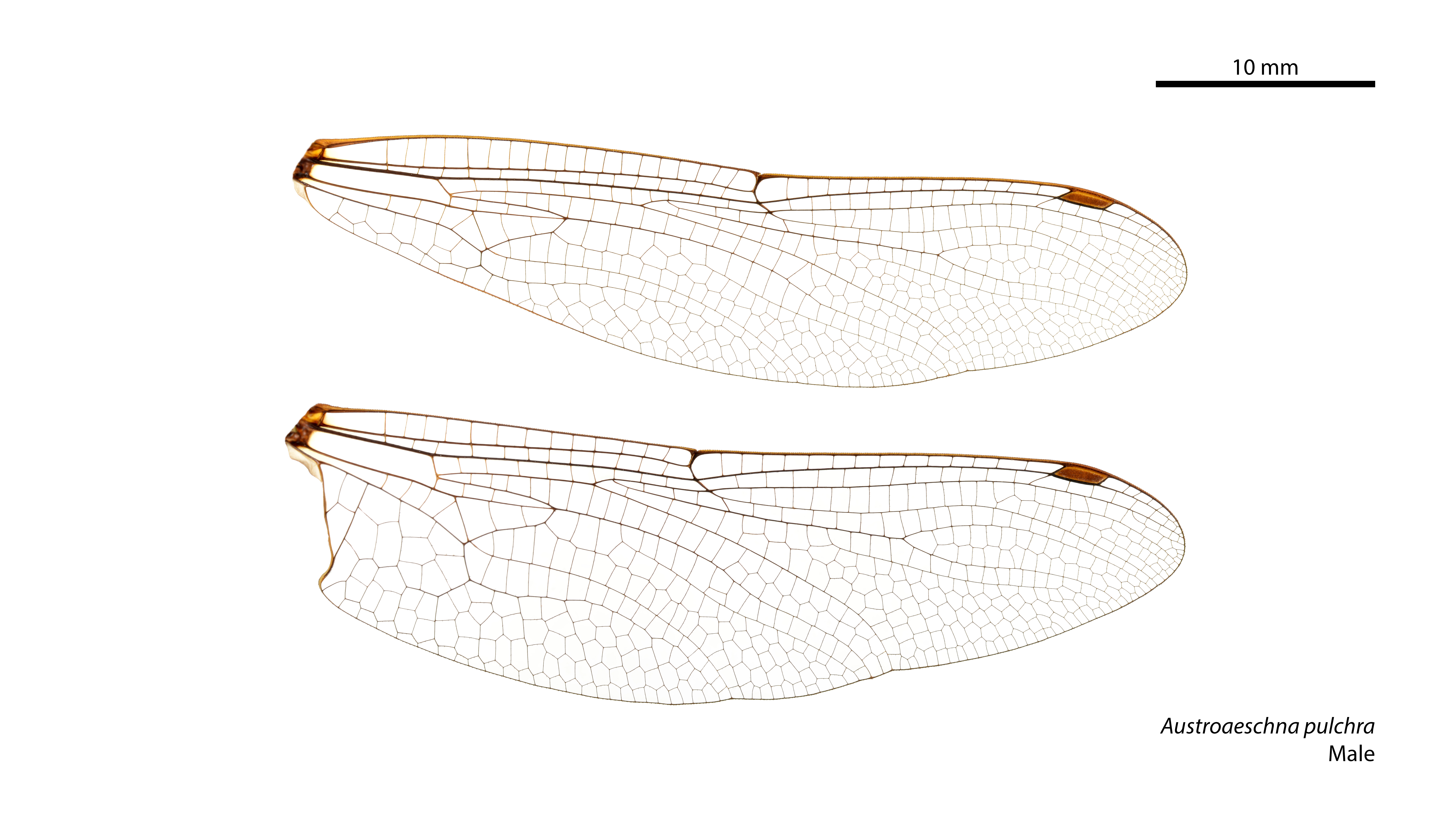
Male wings

== See also ==
- List of dragonflies of Australia
