= Antipodophlebia asthenes =

Terrestrial evening darner

Conservation status
- Least Concern (IUCN 3.1)

Scientific classification
- Kingdom: Animalia
- Phylum: Arthropoda
- Clade: Pancrustacea
- Class: Insecta
- Order: Odonata
- Suborder: Anisoptera
- Family: Aeshnidae
- Genus: Antipodophlebia
- Species: A. asthenes

Binomial name
- Antipodophlebia asthenes (Tillyard, 1916)

Synonyms
- Telephlebia asthenes Tillyard, 1916

Species of dragonfly

Antipodophlebia asthenes is a species of dragonfly of the family Aeshnidae, commonly known as the terrestrial evening darner. It is a medium-sized dragonfly with dull colouring. It is endemic to eastern Australia where it has been found flying low to the ground at dusk.

Antipodophlebia asthenes is the only species of the genus Antipodophlebia.

== Etymology ==
The genus name Antipodophlebia is derived from the Greek ἀντίποδες (antipodes, "those on the opposite side of the world"), referring to its southern locality, combined with φλέψ (phleps, "vein") and the suffix -ia, indicating association with related genera such as Telephlebia and Austrophlebia.

The species name asthenes is derived from the Greek ἀσθενής (asthenēs, "weak" or "feeble"), referring to its small size, open wing venation, and subdued colouration.

== Gallery ==
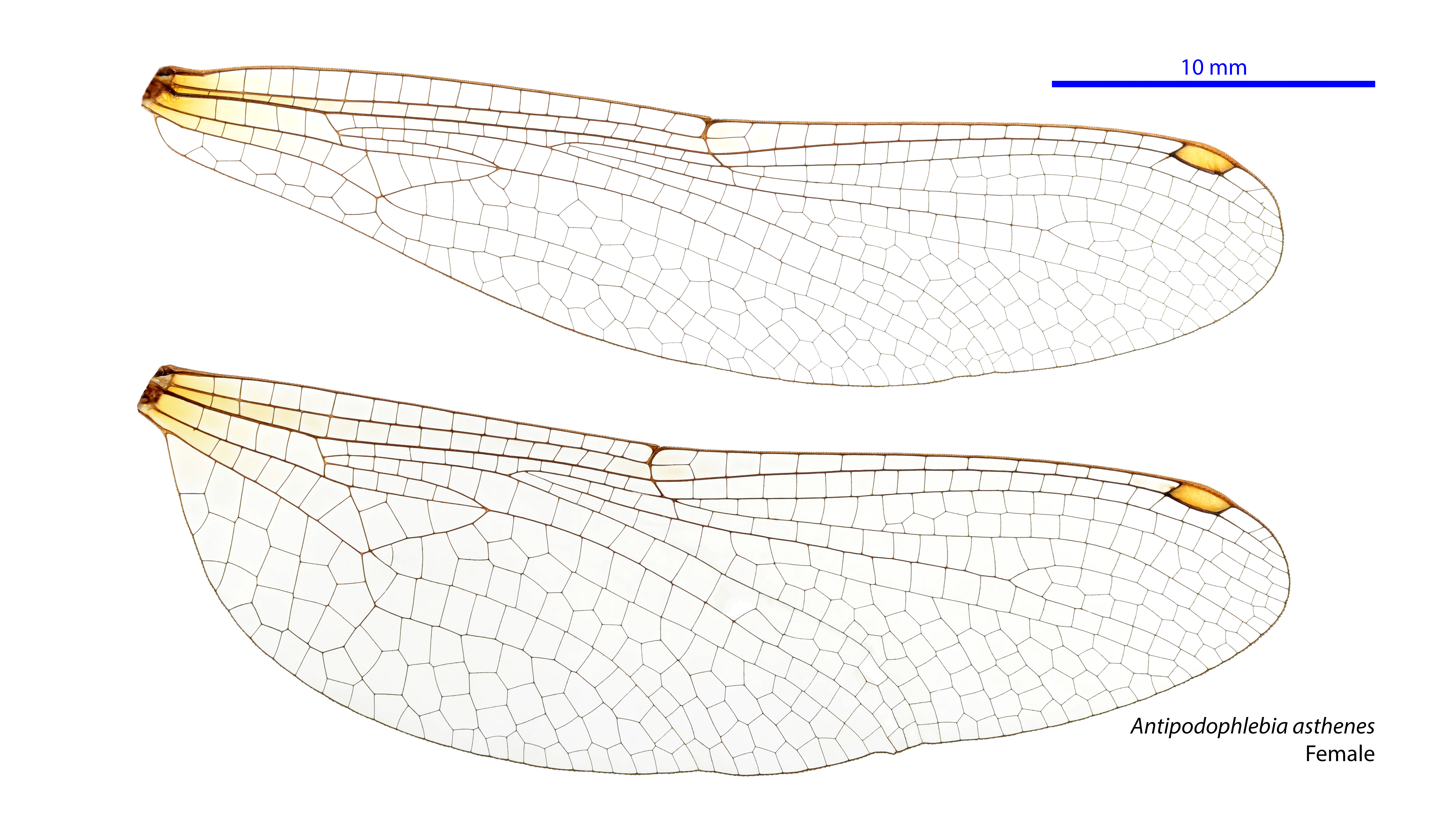
Female wings

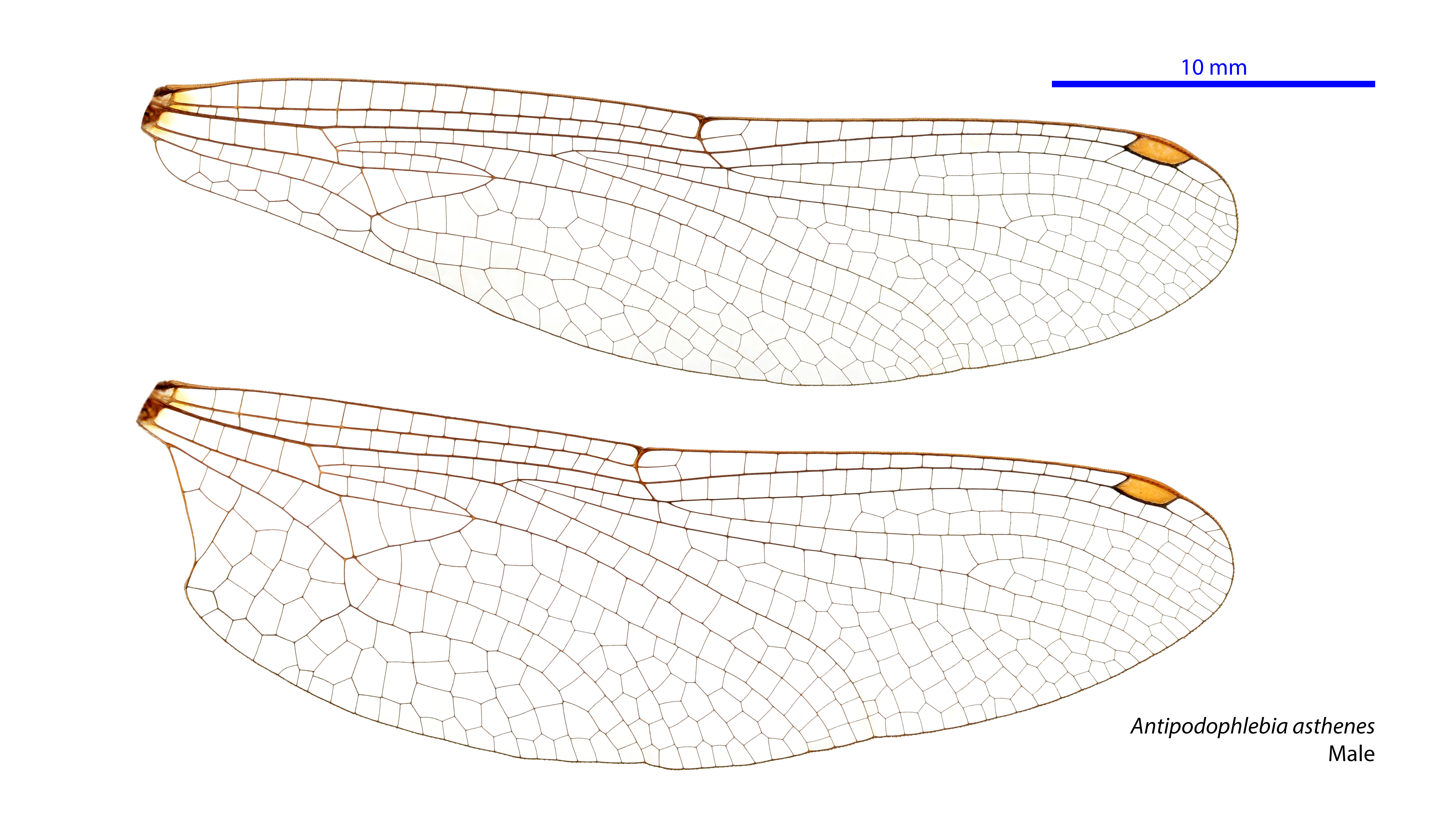
Male wings

== See also ==
- List of Odonata species of Australia
