= Austroaeschna sigma =

Sigma darner

Conservation status
- Least Concern (IUCN 3.1)

Scientific classification
- Kingdom: Animalia
- Phylum: Arthropoda
- Clade: Pancrustacea
- Class: Insecta
- Order: Odonata
- Suborder: Anisoptera
- Family: Aeshnidae
- Genus: Austroaeschna
- Species: A. sigma

Binomial name
- Austroaeschna sigma Theischinger, 1982

Species of dragonfly

Austroaeschna sigma is a species of large dragonfly in the family Aeshnidae, known as the sigma darner. It inhabits the upper reaches of small mountain streams in New South Wales and south-eastern Queensland, Australia.

Austroaeschna sigma is a very dark dragonfly with pale markings. It appears similar to the multi-spotted darner, Austroaeschna multipunctata, which inhabits mountain streams in southern New South Wales and Victoria.

== Etymology ==
The genus name Austroaeschna combines the prefix austro- (from Latin auster, meaning “south wind”, hence “southern”) with Aeshna, a genus of dragonflies.

The species name sigma refers to the Greek letter sigma, corresponding to the English letter "S", and to the shape of a mark on the thorax.

== Gallery ==
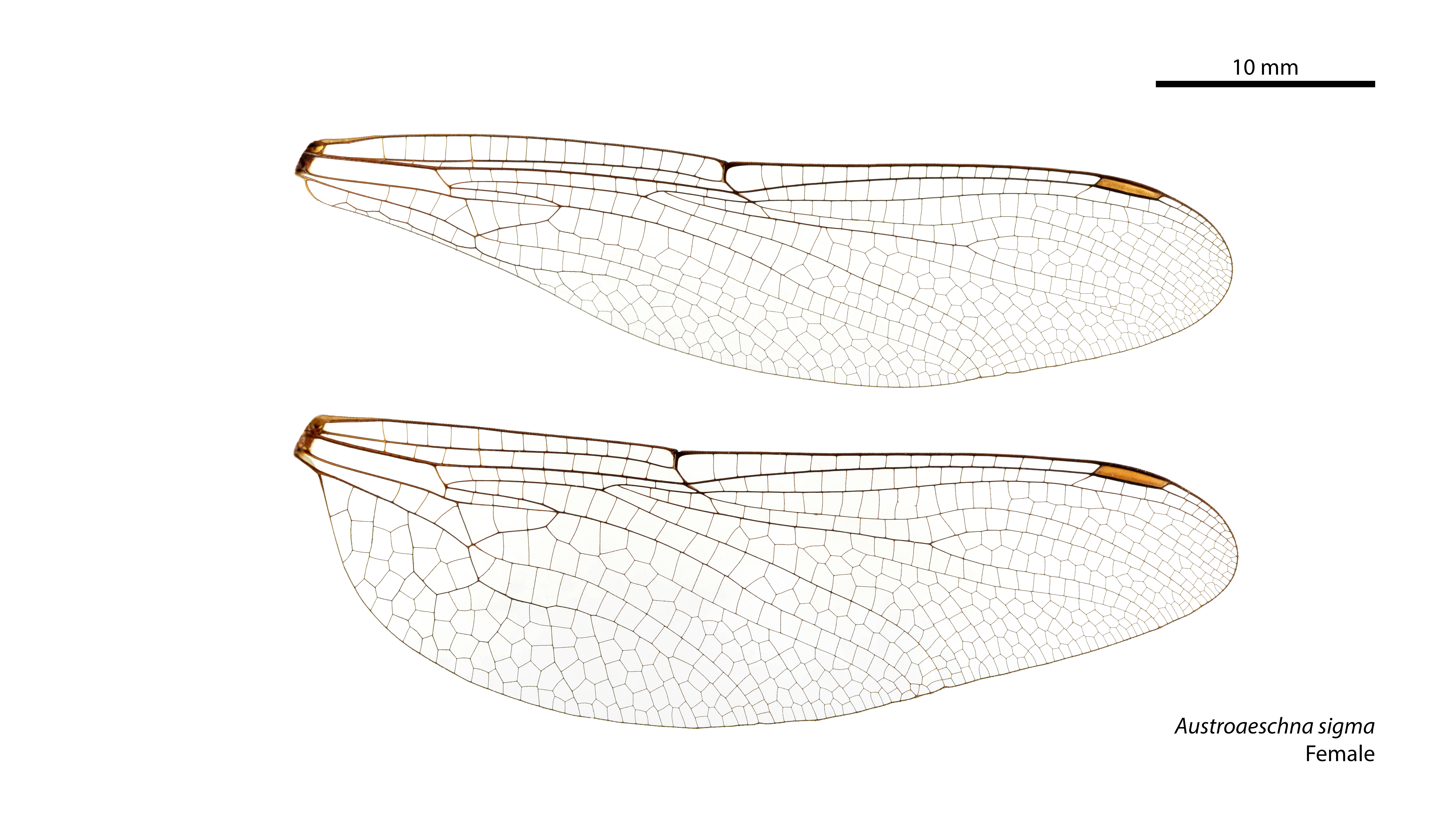
Female wings

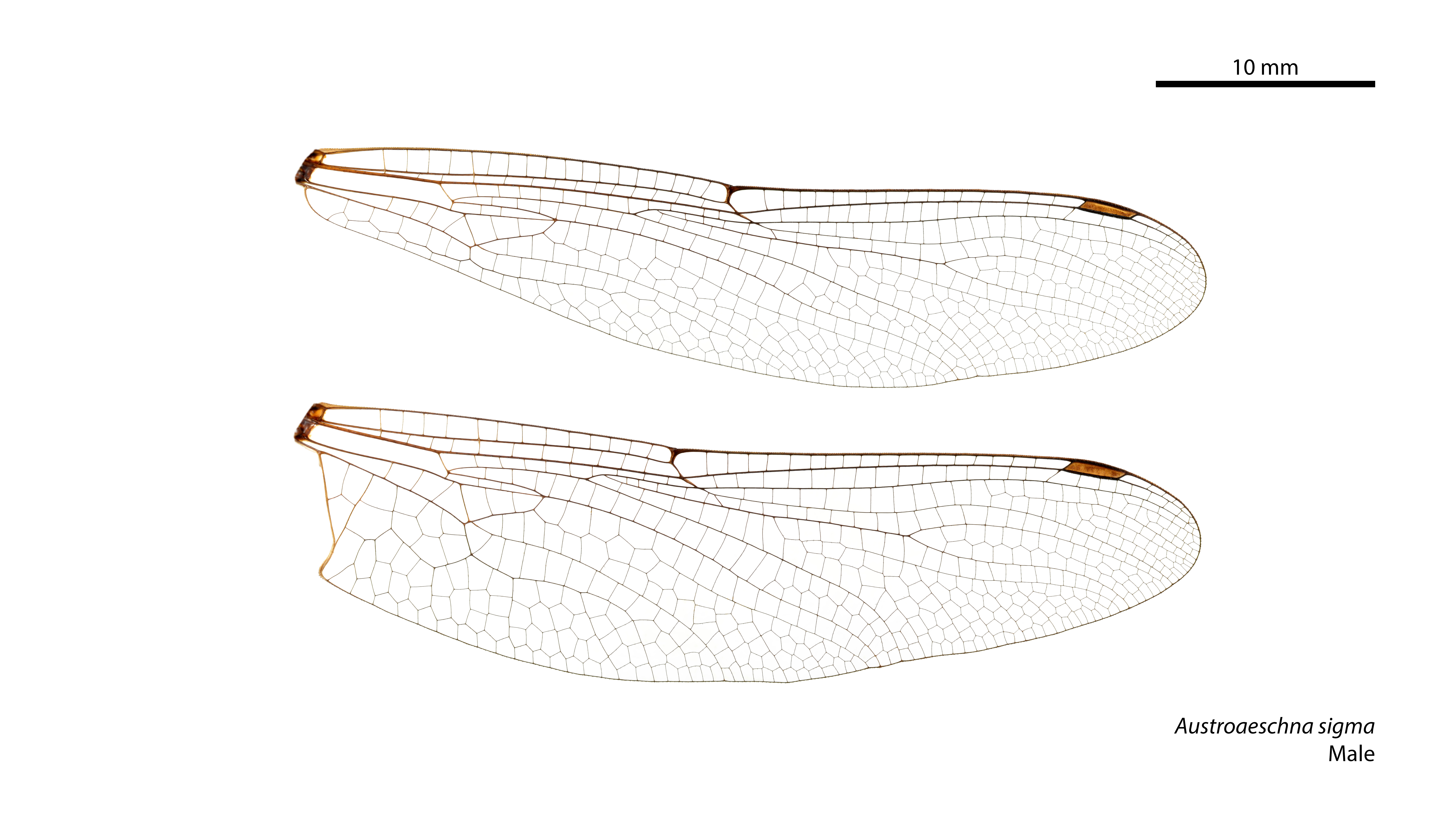
Male wings

== See also ==
- List of dragonflies of Australia
