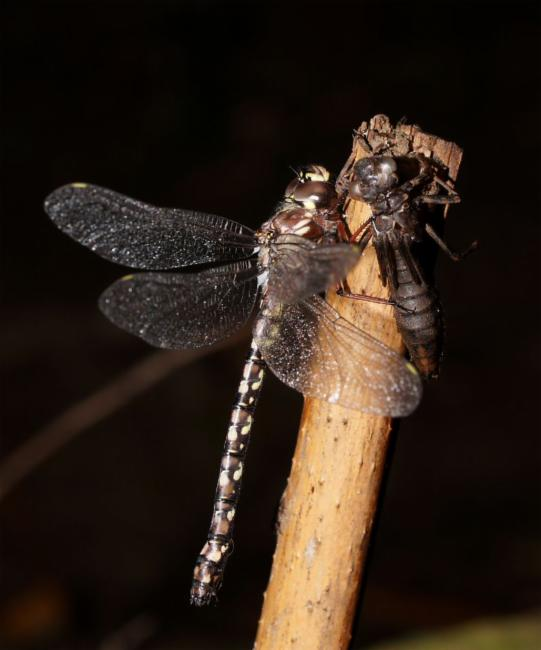

Conservation status
- Least Concern (IUCN 3.1)

Scientific classification
- Kingdom: Animalia
- Phylum: Arthropoda
- Clade: Pancrustacea
- Class: Insecta
- Order: Odonata
- Suborder: Anisoptera
- Family: Aeshnidae
- Genus: Austroaeschna
- Species: A. atrata

Binomial name
- Austroaeschna atrata Martin, 1909

= Austroaeschna atrata =

Mountain darner

Species of dragonfly

Austroaeschna atrata is a species of Australian dragonfly in the family Aeshnidae, known as the mountain darner. It inhabits the upper reaches of mountain streams, generally above an altitude of 400m, in New South Wales and Victoria.

Austroaeschna atrata is a medium-sized to large dragonfly with a very dark colouring and dull markings.

== Etymology ==
The genus name Austroaeschna combines the prefix austro- (from Latin auster, meaning “south wind”, hence “southern”) with Aeshna, a genus of dragonflies.

The species name atrata is derived from the Latin atratus ("blackened"), likely referring to its shiny black face.

== Gallery ==
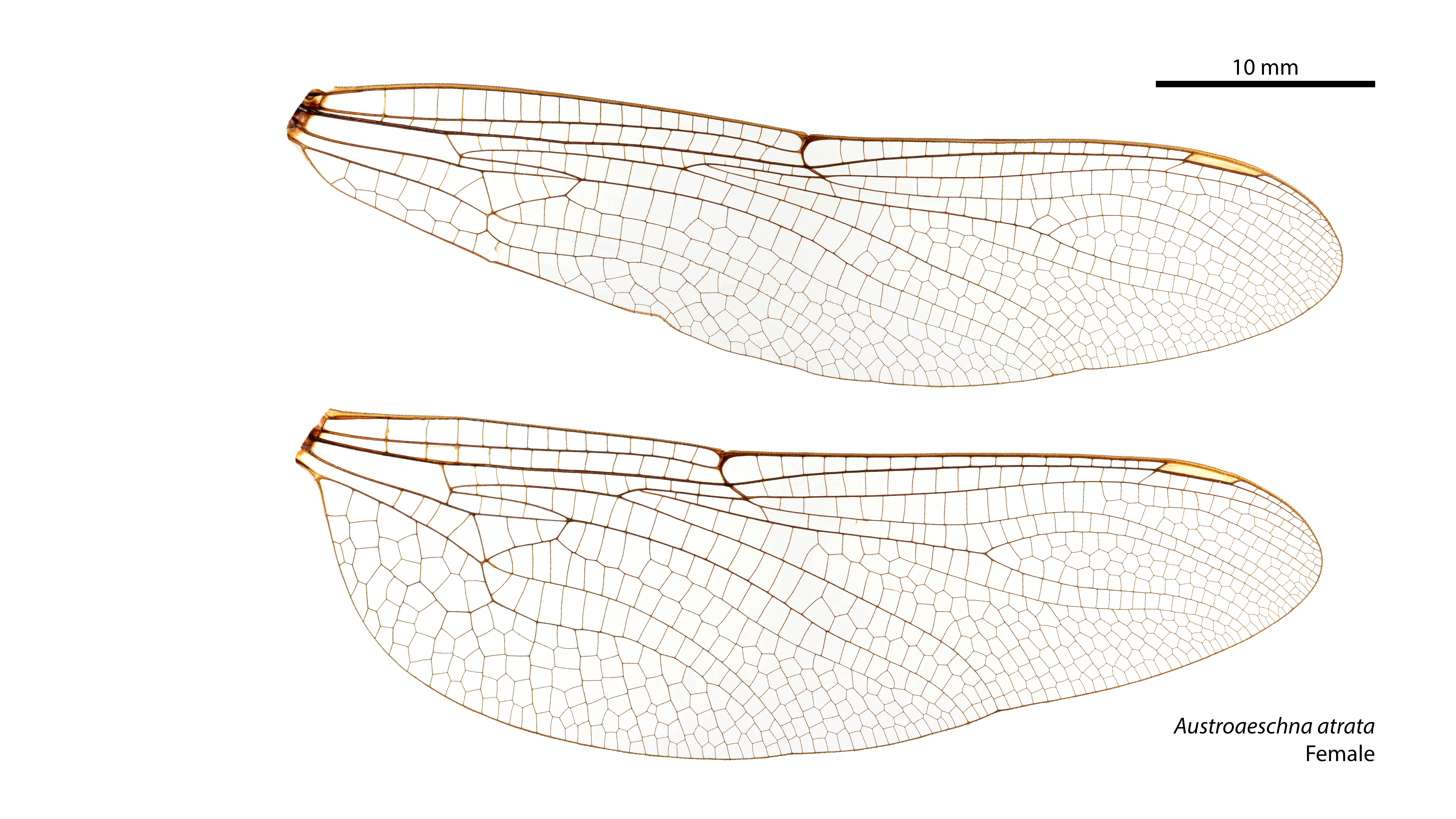
Female wings

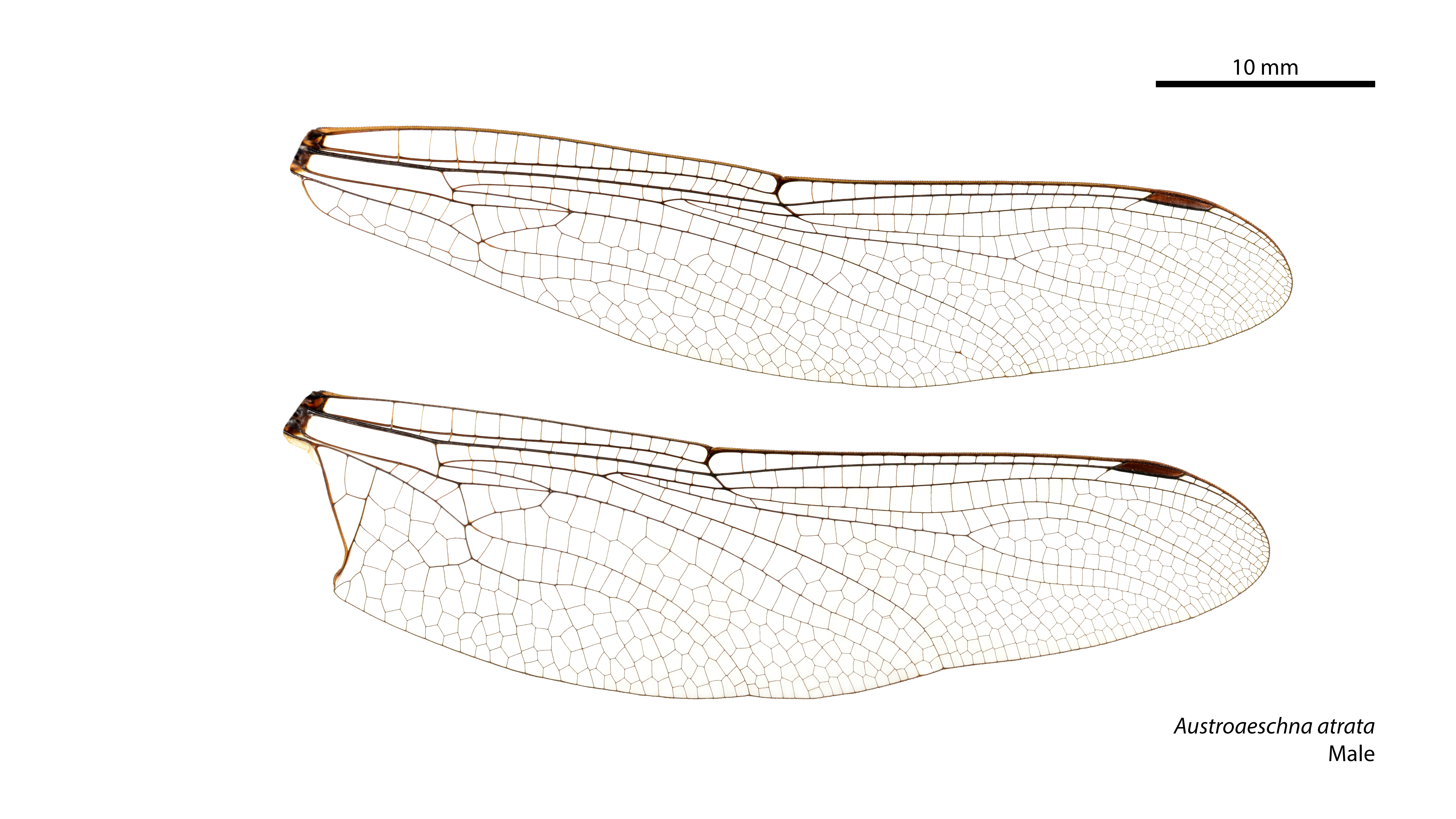
Male wings

== See also ==
- List of dragonflies of Australia
