= Antipodophlebia =

Scientific classification
- Kingdom: Animalia
- Phylum: Arthropoda
- Clade: Pancrustacea
- Class: Insecta
- Order: Odonata
- Suborder: Anisoptera
- Family: Aeshnidae
- Genus: Antipodophlebia; Fraser, 1960

Genus of dragonflies

Antipodophlebia is a genus of dragonflies in the family Aeshnidae, with only one species, which is endemic to south-eastern Australia.

== Species ==
The genus includes one species:

- Antipodophlebia asthenes (Tillyard, 1916) - Terrestrial evening darner

== Etymology ==
The genus name Antipodophlebia is derived from the Greek ἀντίποδες (antipodes, "those on the opposite side of the world"), referring to its southern locality, combined with φλέψ (phleps, "vein") and the suffix -ia, indicating association with related genera such as Telephlebia and Austrophlebia.

== See also ==
- List of Odonata species of Australia
