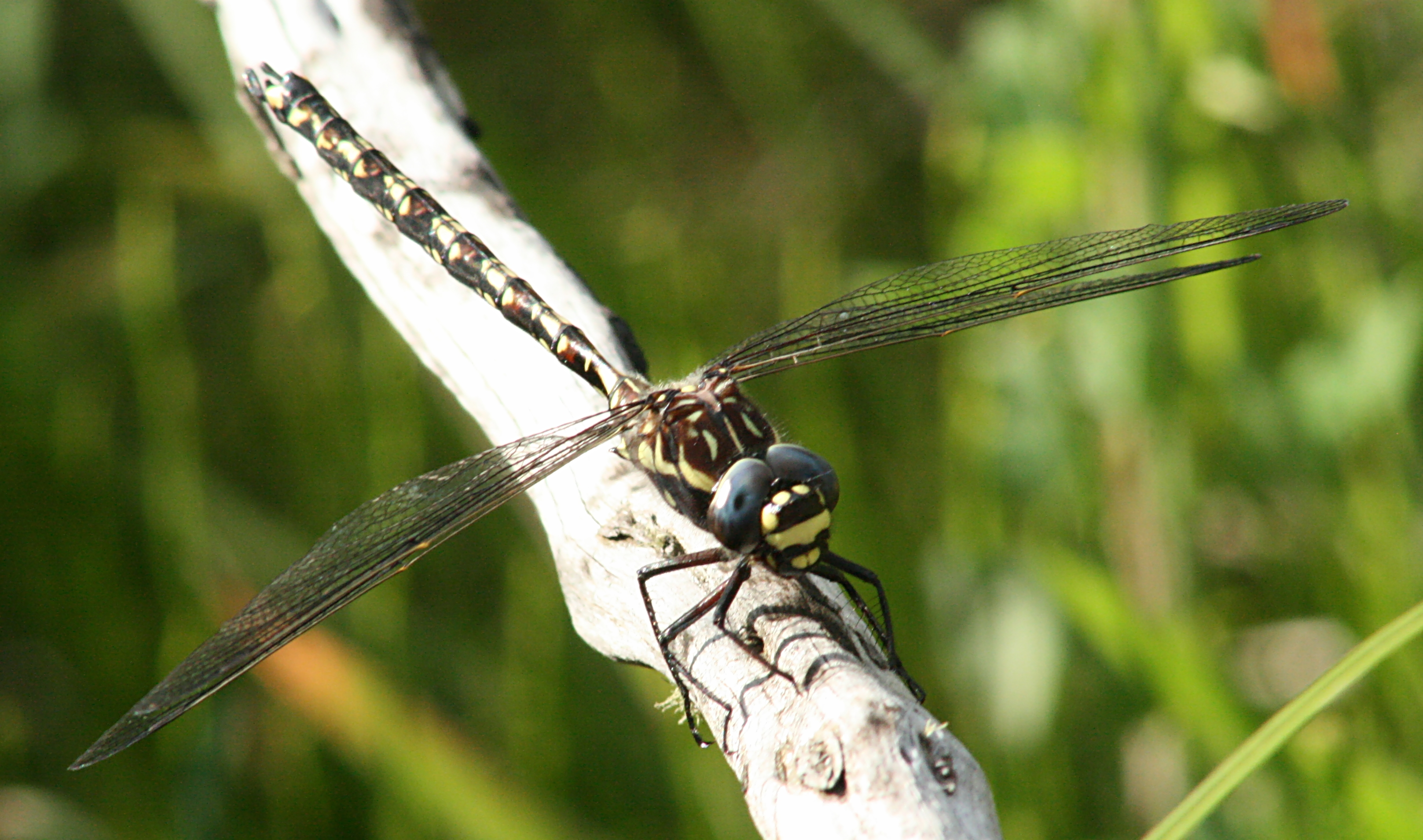
- Alpine Darner

Scientific classification
- Kingdom: Animalia
- Phylum: Arthropoda
- Clade: Pancrustacea
- Class: Insecta
- Order: Odonata
- Suborder: Anisoptera
- Family: Aeshnidae
- Genus: Austroaeschna; Selys, 1883

Synonyms
- Dromaeschna Förster, 1908; Pulchaeschna Peters & Theischinger, 2007

= Austroaeschna =

Genus of dragonflies

Austroaeschna is a genus of dragonflies in the diverse family Aeshnidae.

Species of Austroaeschna are brown to black large dragonflies with dull or brightly coloured markings. One species is found in south-western Australia, while other species of Austroaeschna are indigenous to eastern Australia.

== Etymology ==
The genus name Austroaeschna combines the prefix austro- (from Latin auster, meaning “south wind”, hence “southern”) with Aeshna, a genus of dragonflies. The origin of the name Aeshna is uncertain, but it is thought to derive from Greek. The name Austroaeschna refers to a southern representative of that group.

== Species ==
The genus Austroaeschna includes the following species:

- Austroaeschna anacantha Tillyard, 1908 – western darner
- Austroaeschna atrata Martin, 1909 – mountain darner
- Austroaeschna christine Theischinger, 1993 – S-spot darner
- Austroaeschna cooloola Theischinger, 1991 – wallum darner
- Austroaeschna eungella Theischinger, 1993 – eungella darner
- Austroaeschna flavomaculata Tillyard, 1916 – alpine darner
- Austroaeschna hardyi Tillyard, 1917 – lesser Tasmanian darner
- Austroaeschna inermis Martin, 1901 – whitewater darner
- Austroaeschna ingrid Theischinger, 2008 - Grampians darner
- Austroaeschna muelleri Theischinger, 1982 – Carnarvon darner
- Austroaeschna multipunctata (Martin, 1901) – multi-Spotted darner
- Austroaeschna obscura Theischinger, 1982 – Sydney mountain darner
- Austroaeschna parvistigma Selys, 1883 – swamp darner
- Austroaeschna pinheyi Theischinger, 2001 – inland darner
- Austroaeschna pulchra Tillyard in Martin, 1909 – forest darner
- Austroaeschna sigma Theischinger, 1982 – sigma darner
- Austroaeschna speciosa Sjöstedt, 1917 – tropical unicorn darner
- Austroaeschna subapicalis Theischinger, 1982 – conehead darner
- Austroaeschna tasmanica Tillyard, 1916 – Tasmanian darner
- Austroaeschna unicornis (Martin, 1901) – unicorn darner

The following species are considered to be in the genus Austroaeschna by the Australian Faunal Directory.

- Dromaeschna forcipata (Tillyard, 1907) – green-striped darner
- Dromaeschna weiskei Förster, 1908 – ochre-tipped darner
