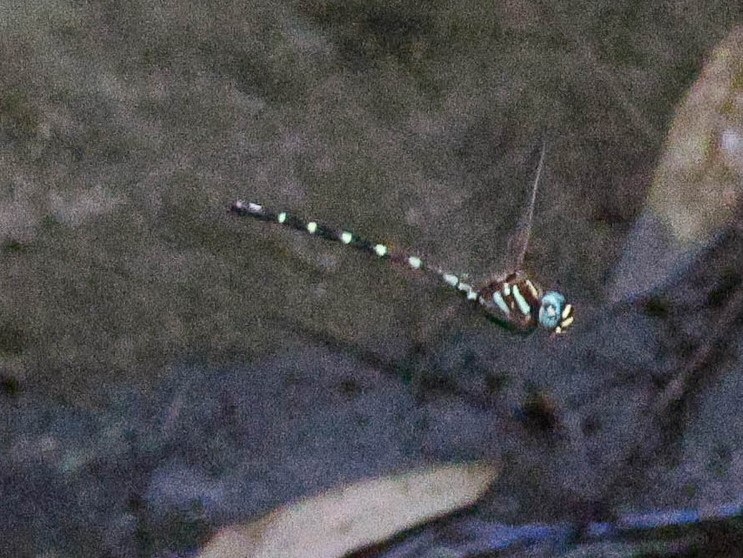

Conservation status
- Endangered (IUCN 3.1)

Scientific classification
- Kingdom: Animalia
- Phylum: Arthropoda
- Clade: Pancrustacea
- Class: Insecta
- Order: Odonata
- Suborder: Anisoptera
- Family: Aeshnidae
- Genus: Austroaeschna
- Species: A. muelleri

Binomial name
- Austroaeschna muelleri Theischinger, 1982

= Austroaeschna muelleri =

Carnarvon darner

Species of dragonfly

Austroaeschna muelleri is a species of large dragonfly in the family Aeshnidae, known as the Carnarvon darner. It has been found only in Carnarvon National Park in Central Queensland, Australia, where it inhabits small rocky streams.

The male Austroaeschna muelleri is black with blue markings, while the female is brown with yellow markings.

== Etymology ==
The genus name Austroaeschna combines the prefix austro- (from Latin auster, meaning “south wind”, hence “southern”) with Aeshna, a genus of dragonflies.

In 1982, Günther Theischinger named this species muelleri, an eponym honouring his friend and supporter Leonard Müller of Berowra, New South Wales.

== Gallery ==
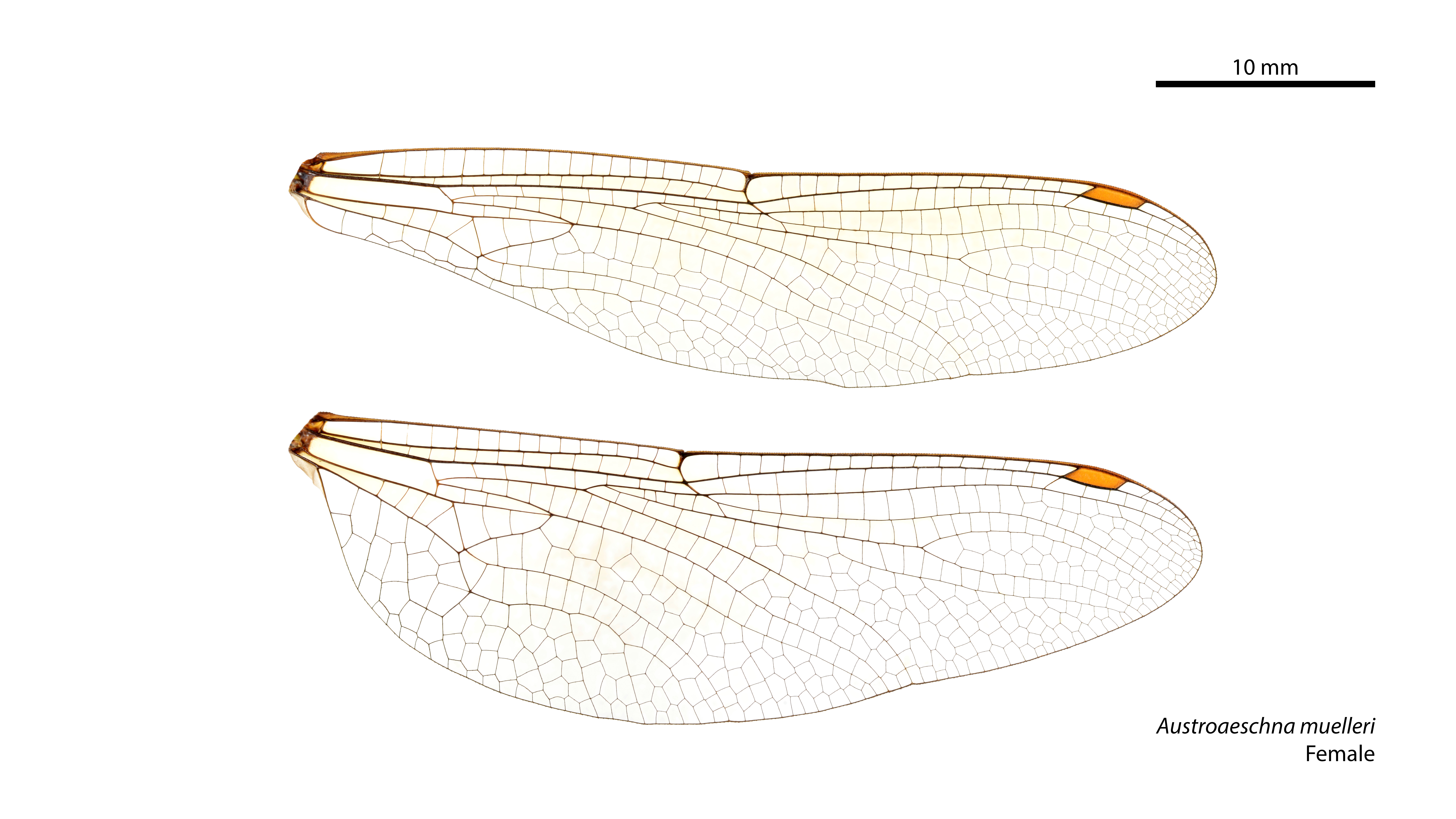
Female wings

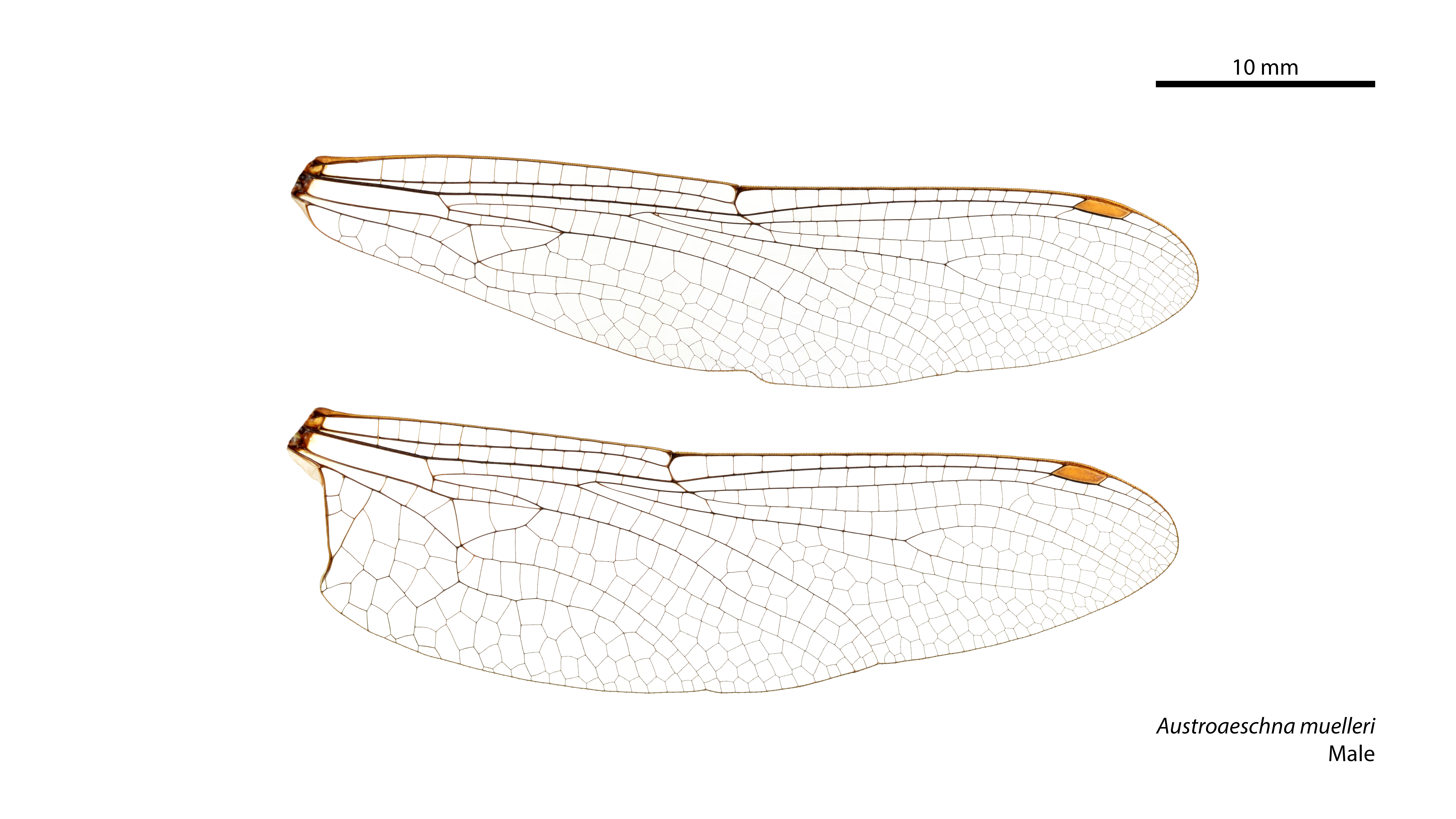
Male wings

== See also ==
- List of dragonflies of Australia
