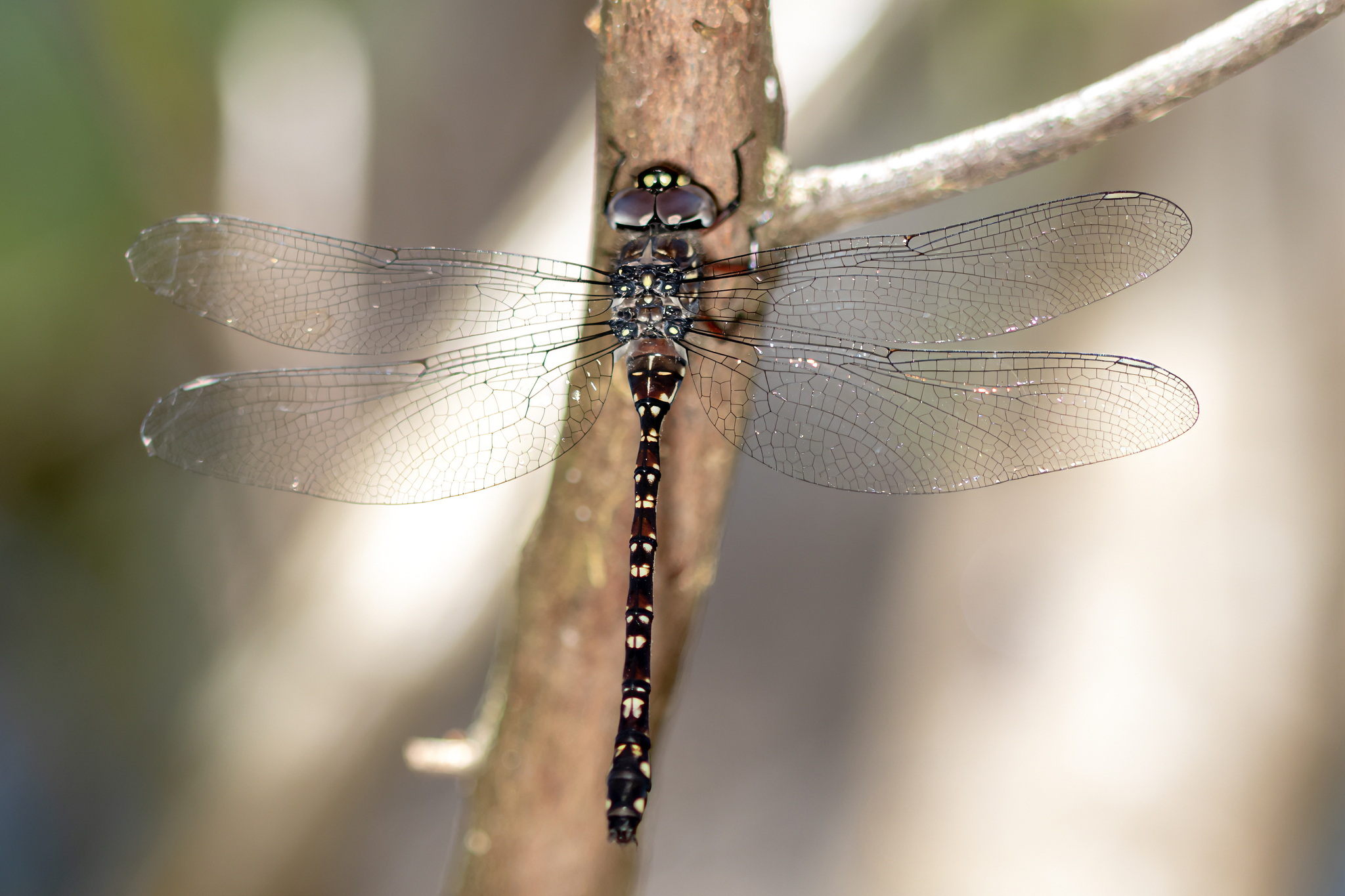

Conservation status
- Least Concern (IUCN 3.1)

Scientific classification
- Kingdom: Animalia
- Phylum: Arthropoda
- Clade: Pancrustacea
- Class: Insecta
- Order: Odonata
- Suborder: Anisoptera
- Family: Aeshnidae
- Genus: Austroaeschna
- Species: A. multipunctata

Binomial name
- Austroaeschna multipunctata (Martin, 1901)

Synonyms
- Planaeschna multipunctata Martin, 1901

= Austroaeschna multipunctata =

Multi-spotted darner

Species of dragonfly

Austroaeschna multipunctata is a species of large dragonfly in the family Aeshnidae, known as the multi-spotted darner. It inhabits small mountain streams in southern New South Wales and eastern Victoria, Australia.

Austroaeschna multipunctata is a very dark dragonfly with pale markings.

== Etymology ==
The genus name Austroaeschna combines the prefix austro- (from Latin auster, meaning “south wind”, hence “southern”) with Aeshna, a genus of dragonflies.

The species name multipunctata is derived from the Latin multus ("many"), punctum ("point" or "spot"), and the suffix -atus ("provided with"), referring to numerous yellow spots on the thorax and abdomen.

== Gallery ==
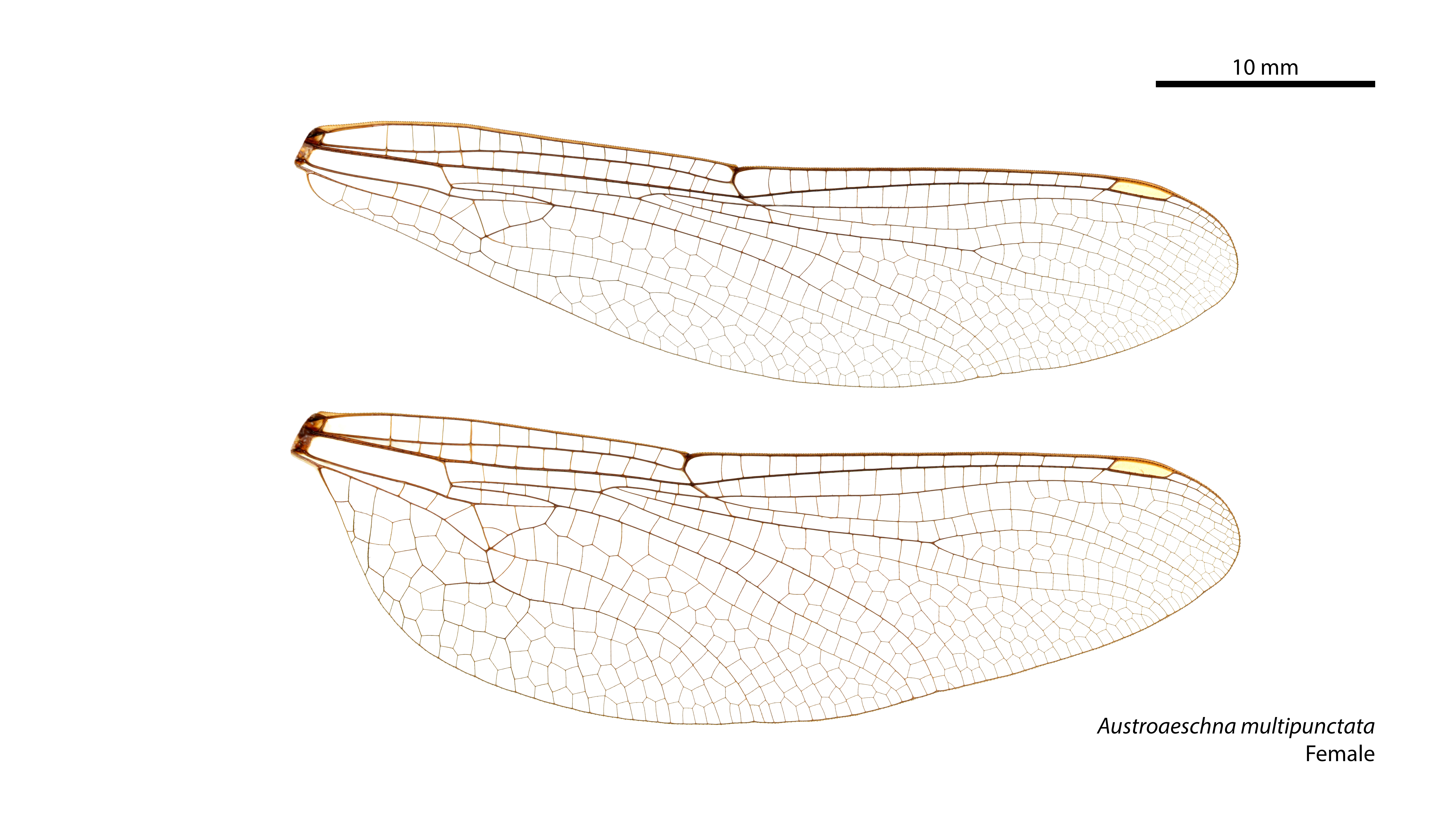
Female wings

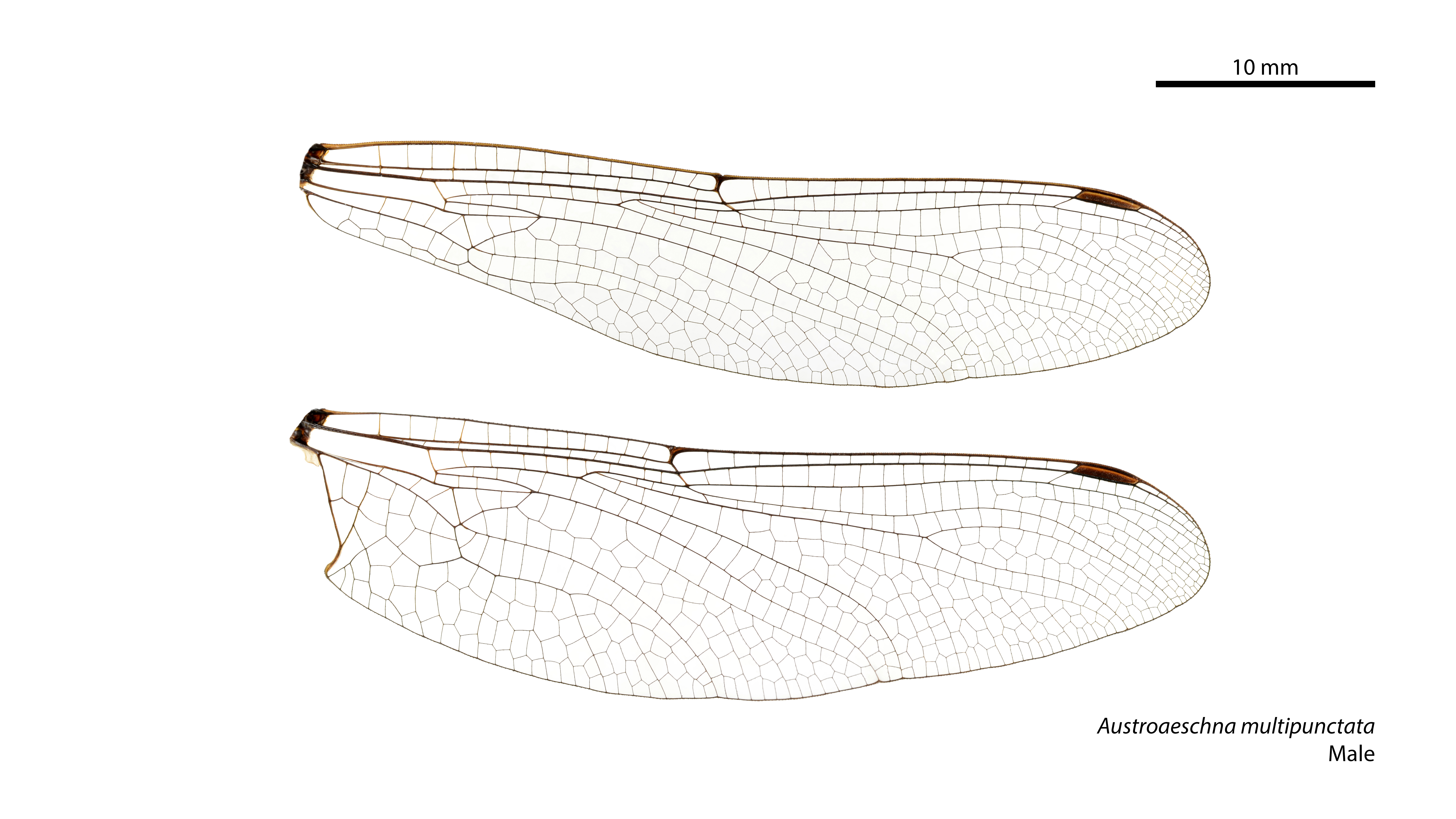
Male wings

== See also ==
- List of dragonflies of Australia
