= Swamp darner =

Swamp darner may refer to:

- Austroaeschna parvistigma, a species of dragonfly native to Australia
- Epiaeschna heros, a species of dragonfly, found in North America
