= Austroaeschna cooloola =

Wallum darner

Conservation status
- Endangered (IUCN 3.1)

Scientific classification
- Kingdom: Animalia
- Phylum: Arthropoda
- Clade: Pancrustacea
- Class: Insecta
- Order: Odonata
- Suborder: Anisoptera
- Family: Aeshnidae
- Genus: Austroaeschna
- Species: A. cooloola

Binomial name
- Austroaeschna cooloola Theischinger, 1991

Species of dragonfly

Austroaeschna cooloola is a species of large dragonfly in the family Aeshnidae, known as the Wallum darner. It has been found in south-eastern Queensland, Australia, where it inhabits sandy and densely vegetated streams.

Austroaeschna cooloola is a dark brown to black dragonfly with blue markings. It appears similar to the more widespread unicorn darner, Austroaeschna unicornis, and the tropical unicorn darner, Austroaeschna speciosa, found near Cairns in Far North Queensland.

== Etymology ==
The genus name Austroaeschna combines the prefix austro- (from Latin auster, meaning “south wind”, hence “southern”) with Aeshna, a genus of dragonflies.

The species name cooloola refers to Cooloola National Park, Queensland (now part of Great Sandy National Park), where the species was first recorded.

== Gallery ==
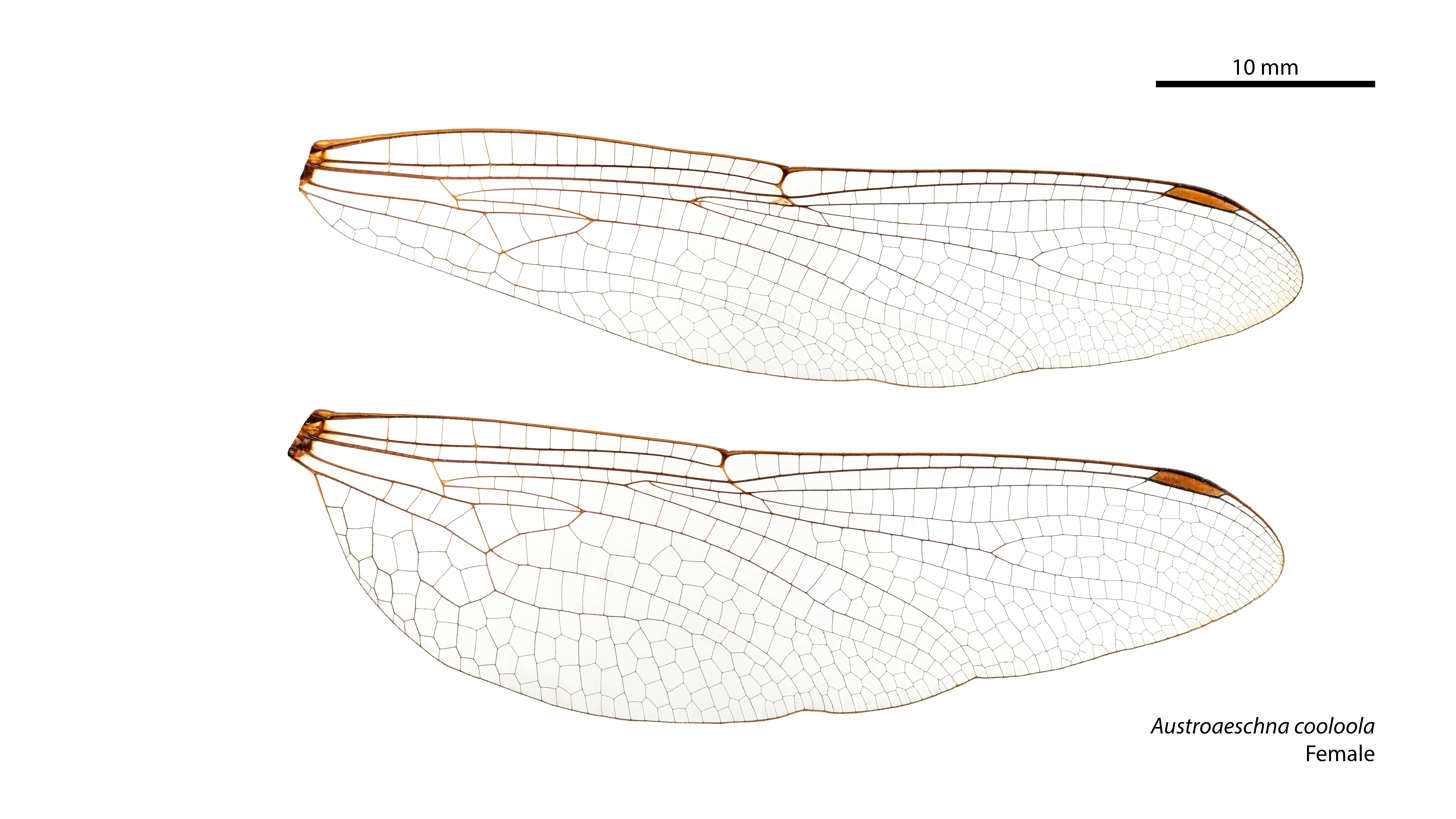
Female wings

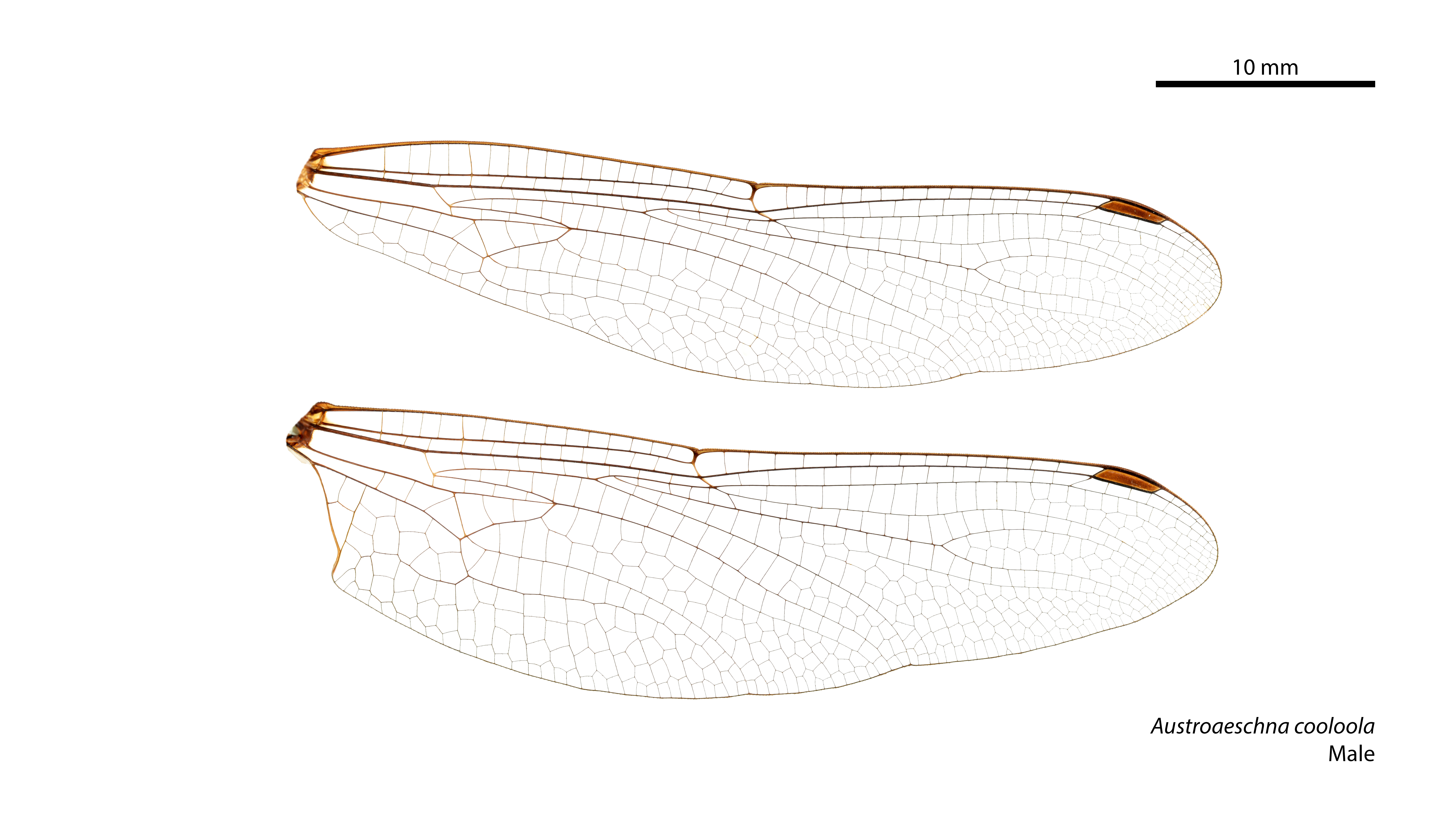
Male wings

== See also ==
- List of dragonflies of Australia
