= Austroaeschna anacantha =

Western darner

Conservation status
- Least Concern (IUCN 3.1)

Scientific classification
- Kingdom: Animalia
- Phylum: Arthropoda
- Clade: Pancrustacea
- Class: Insecta
- Order: Odonata
- Suborder: Anisoptera
- Family: Aeshnidae
- Genus: Austroaeschna
- Species: A. anacantha

Binomial name
- Austroaeschna anacantha Tillyard, 1908

Synonyms
- Austroaeschna aspersa Martin, 1909

Species of dragonfly

Austroaeschna anacantha is a species of dragonfly belonging to the family Aeshnidae, known as the western darner. It is found in south-western Australia, where it inhabits rivers and streams.

Austroaeschna anacantha is a medium-sized to large dark dragonfly with pale markings. It appears similar to the multi-spotted darner, Austroaeschna multipunctata, which occurs in eastern Australia.

== Etymology ==
The genus name Austroaeschna combines the prefix austro- (from Latin auster, meaning “south wind”, hence “southern”) with Aeshna, a genus of dragonflies.

The species name anacantha is derived from Greek ἀν- (an-, "without") and ἄκανθα (akantha, "thorn"), referring to the absence of a large dorsal spine on segment 10 of the male, present in related species such as Austroaeschna parvistigma and Austroaeschna multipunctata.

== Gallery ==
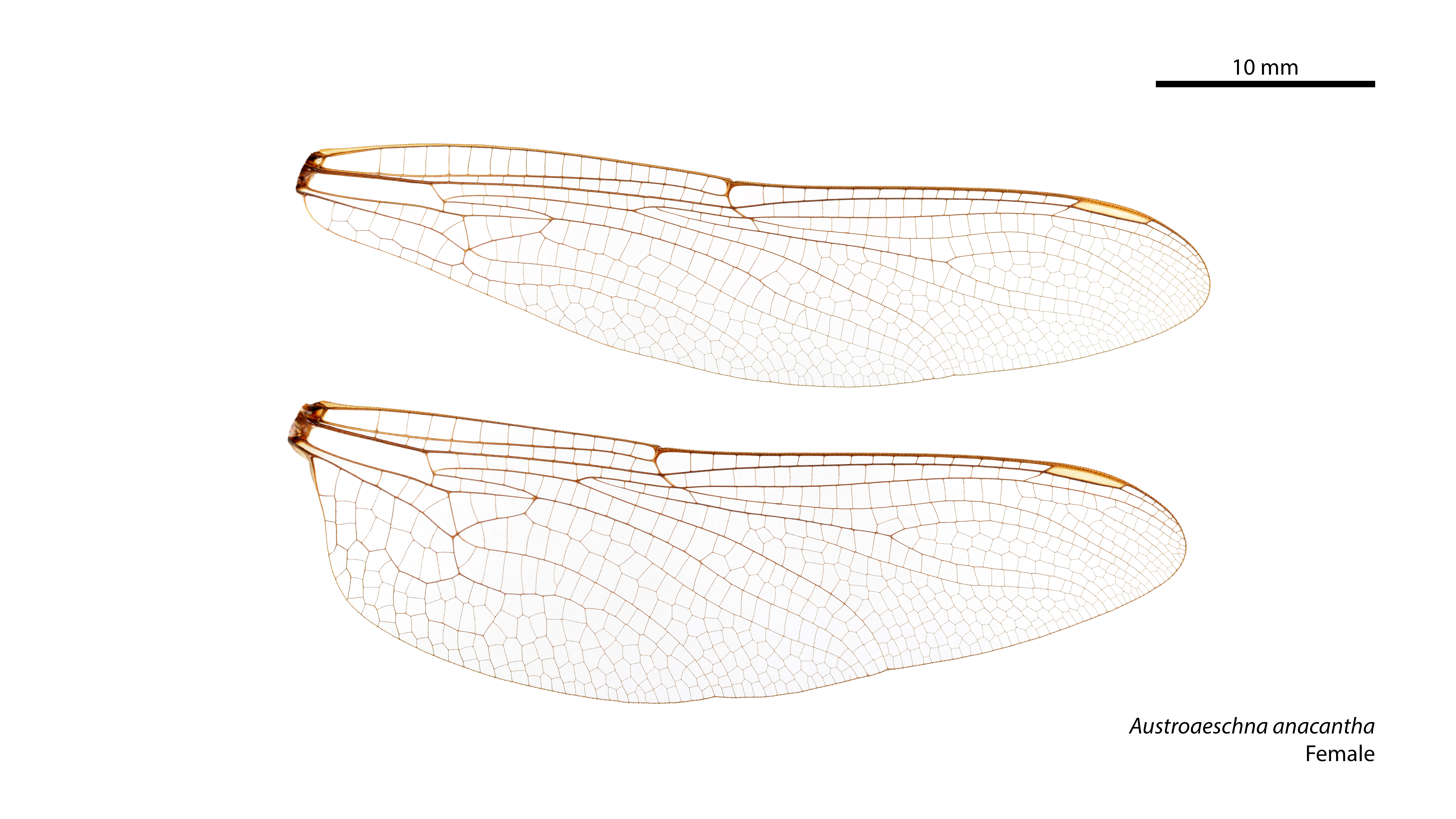
Female wings

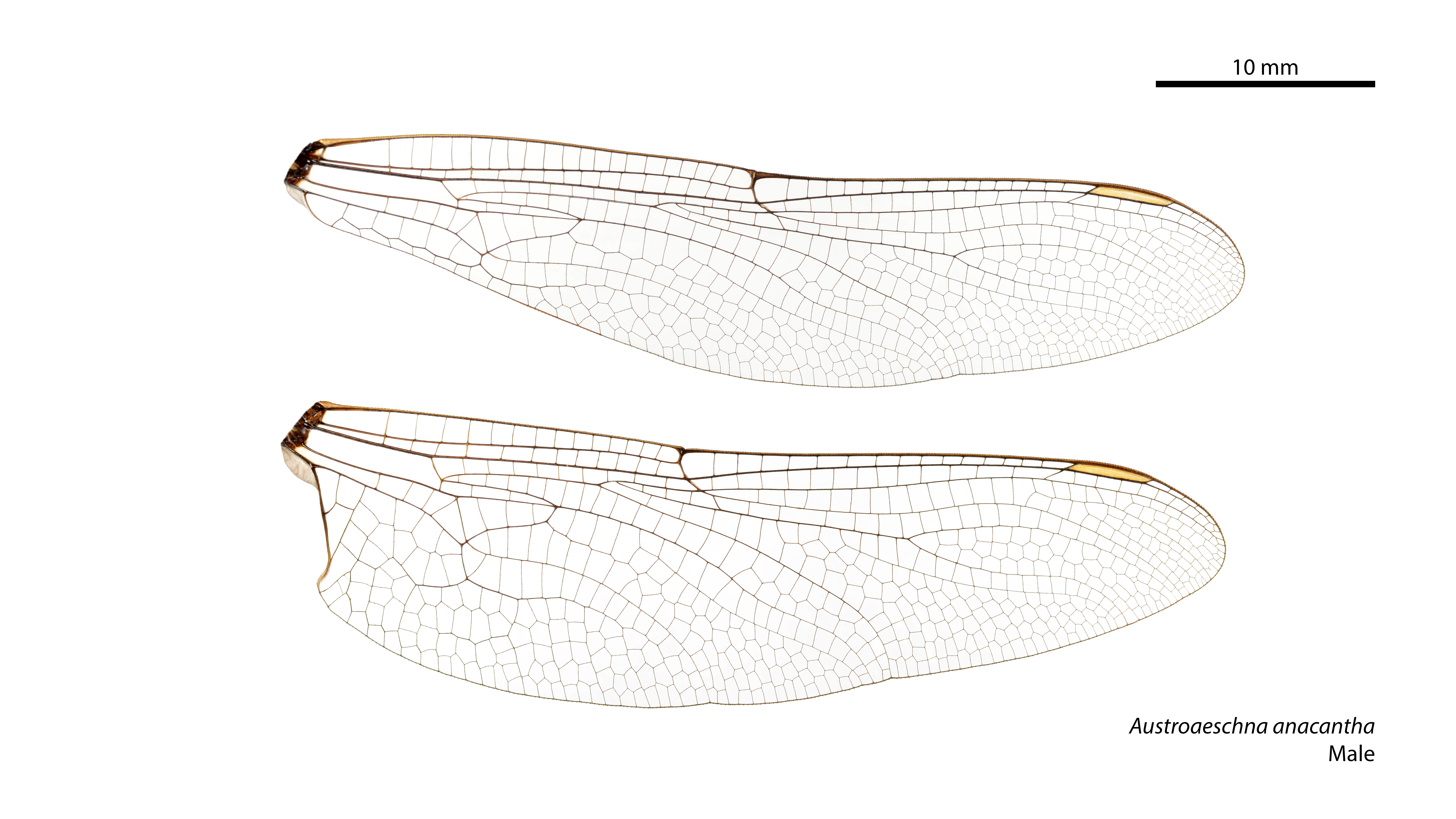
Male wings

== See also ==
- List of dragonflies of Australia
