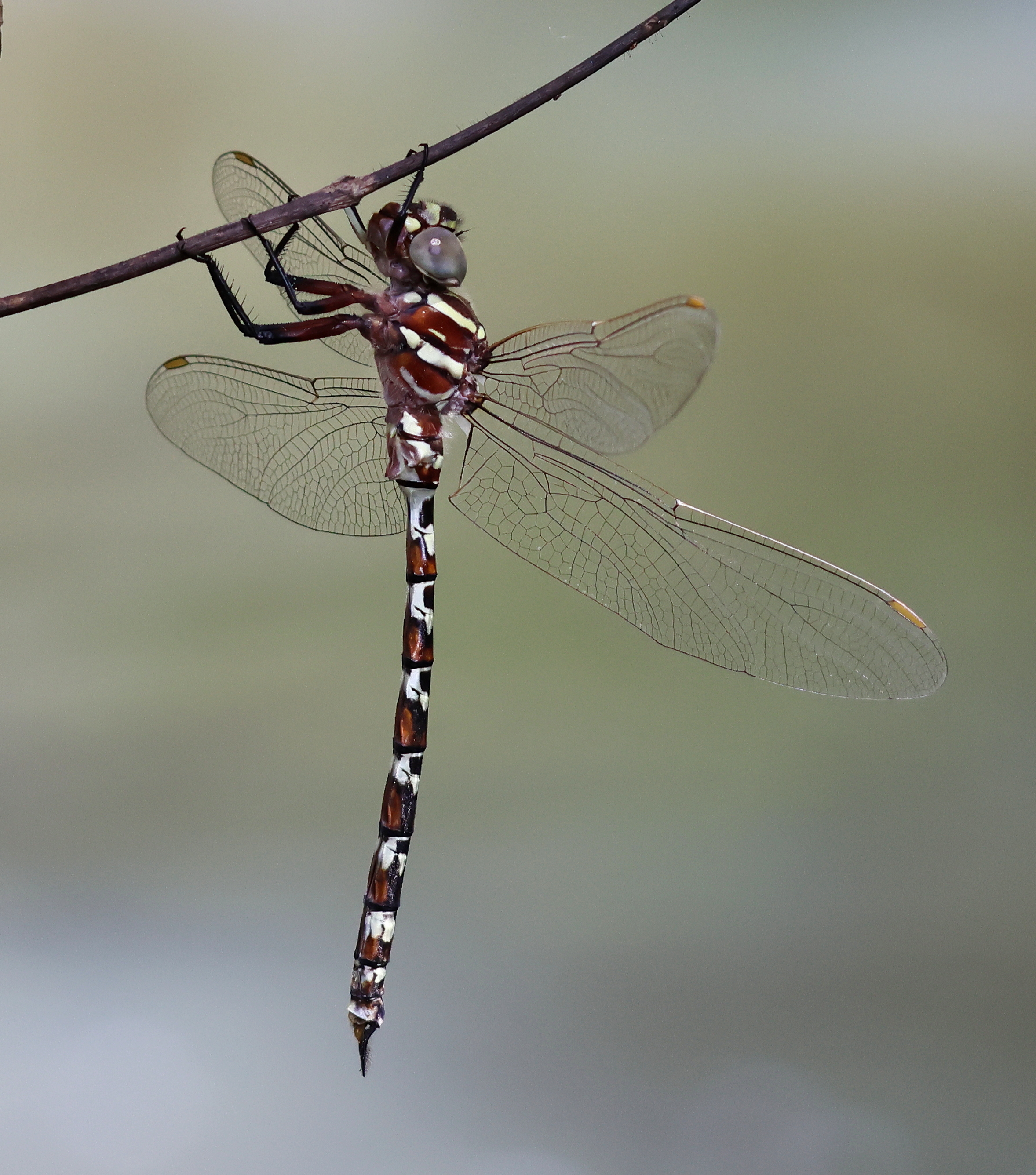
- Male
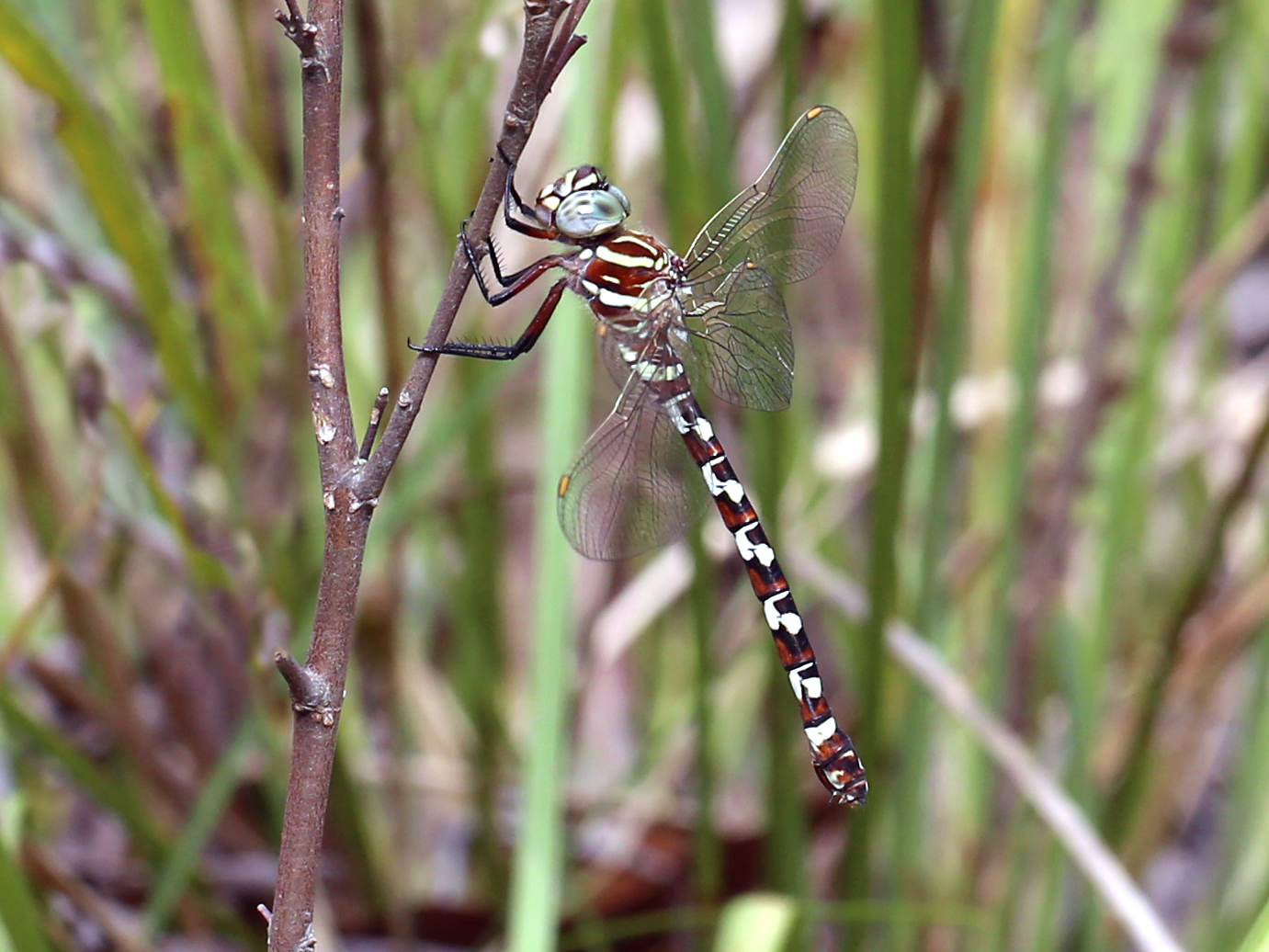
- Female

Conservation status
- Near Threatened (IUCN 3.1)

Scientific classification
- Kingdom: Animalia
- Phylum: Arthropoda
- Clade: Pancrustacea
- Class: Insecta
- Order: Odonata
- Suborder: Anisoptera
- Family: Aeshnidae
- Genus: Austroaeschna
- Species: A. speciosa

Binomial name
- Austroaeschna speciosa Sjöstedt, 1917

= Austroaeschna speciosa =

Species of dragonfly

Austroaeschna speciosa is a species of dragonfly in the family Aeshnidae, known as the tropical unicorn darner. It is known to be present only in the mountainous regions of north-east Queensland, Australia. It appears very similar to the more widespread Austroaeschna unicornis (unicorn darner) which inhabits areas in southern Queensland, New South Wales, Victoria and Tasmania.

== Description ==
The tropical unicorn darner is a large dragonfly with a body length around 80mm and wing-span of 100mm. The abdomen on segments 3 to 8 is black and reddish-brown, heavily marked with pale yellow spots or patches. The synthorax is reddish-brown with prominent yellow stripes darkly outlined. The prominent eyes are pale grey to green, meeting at the top of the head. The wings are clear and the pterostigma are yellow.

== Habitat ==
The tropical unicorn darner inhabits rocky sections of stream and rivers.

== Etymology ==
The genus name Austroaeschna combines the prefix austro- (from Latin auster, meaning “south wind”, hence “southern”) with Aeshna, a genus of dragonflies.

The species name speciosa is derived from the Latin speciosus ("beautiful" or "imposing").

== Gallery ==
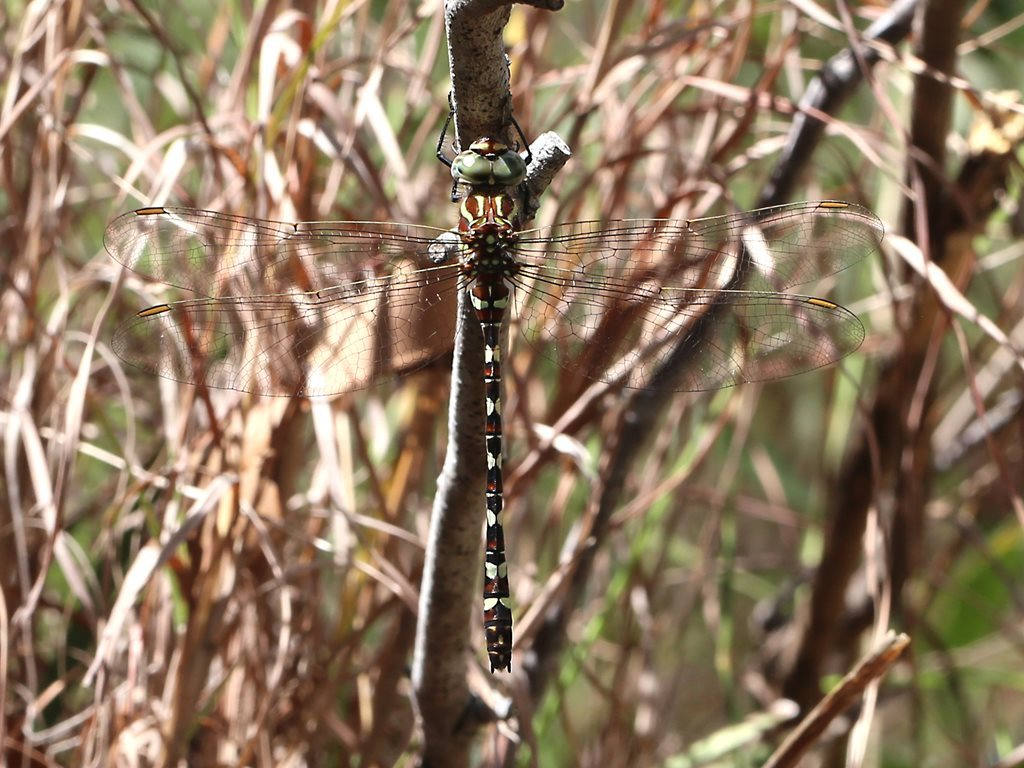
Female

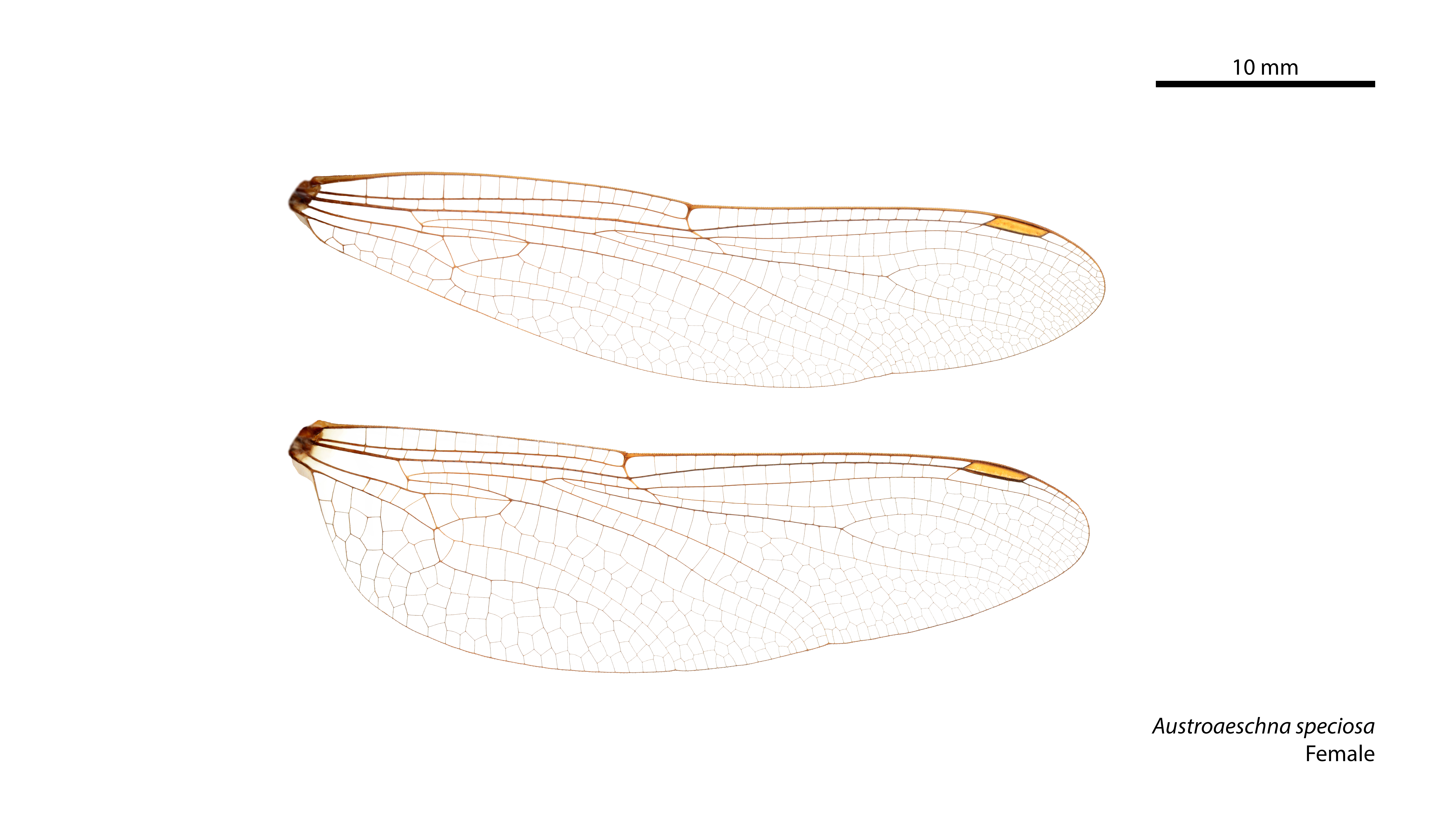
Female wings

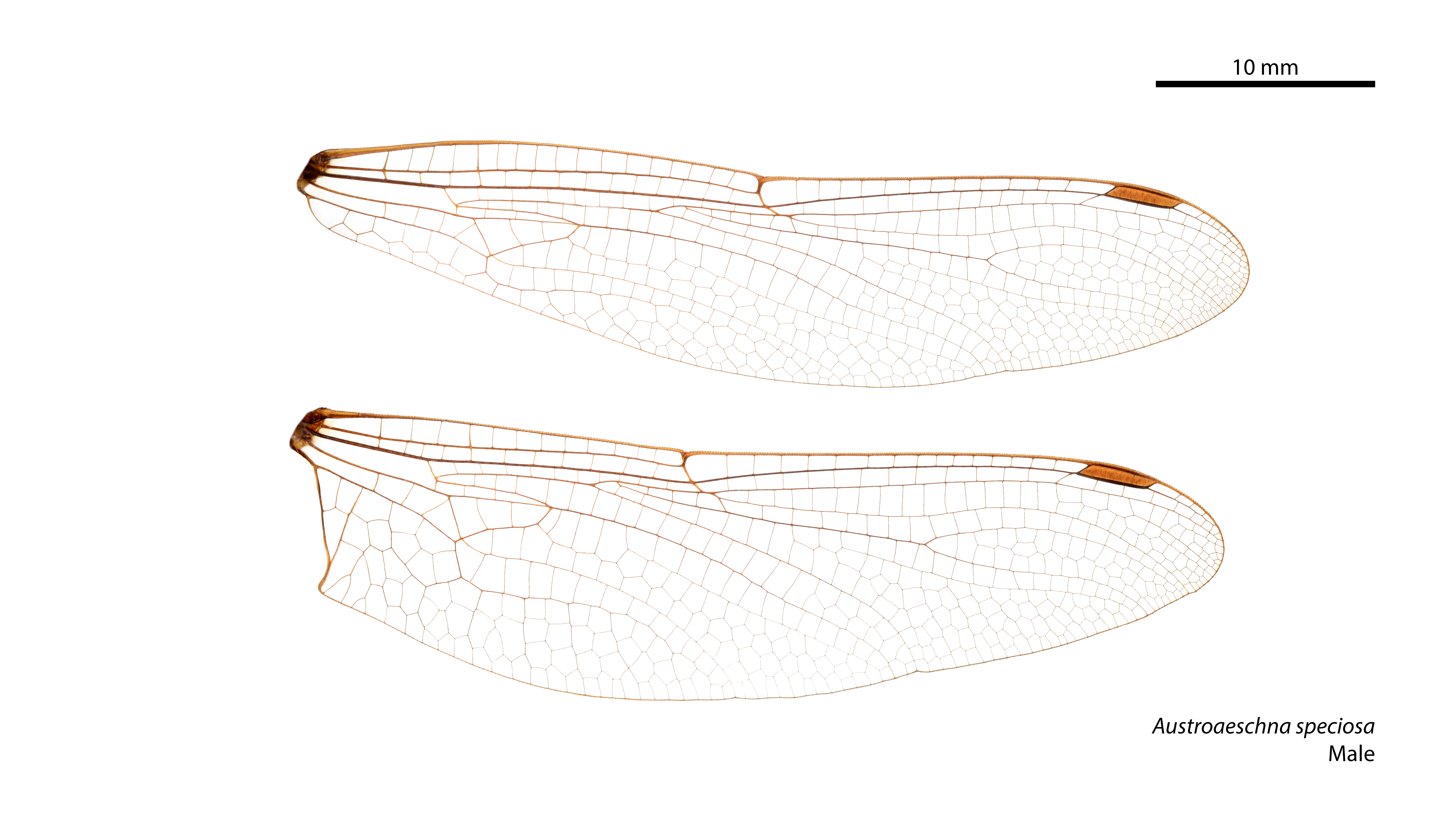
Male wings
