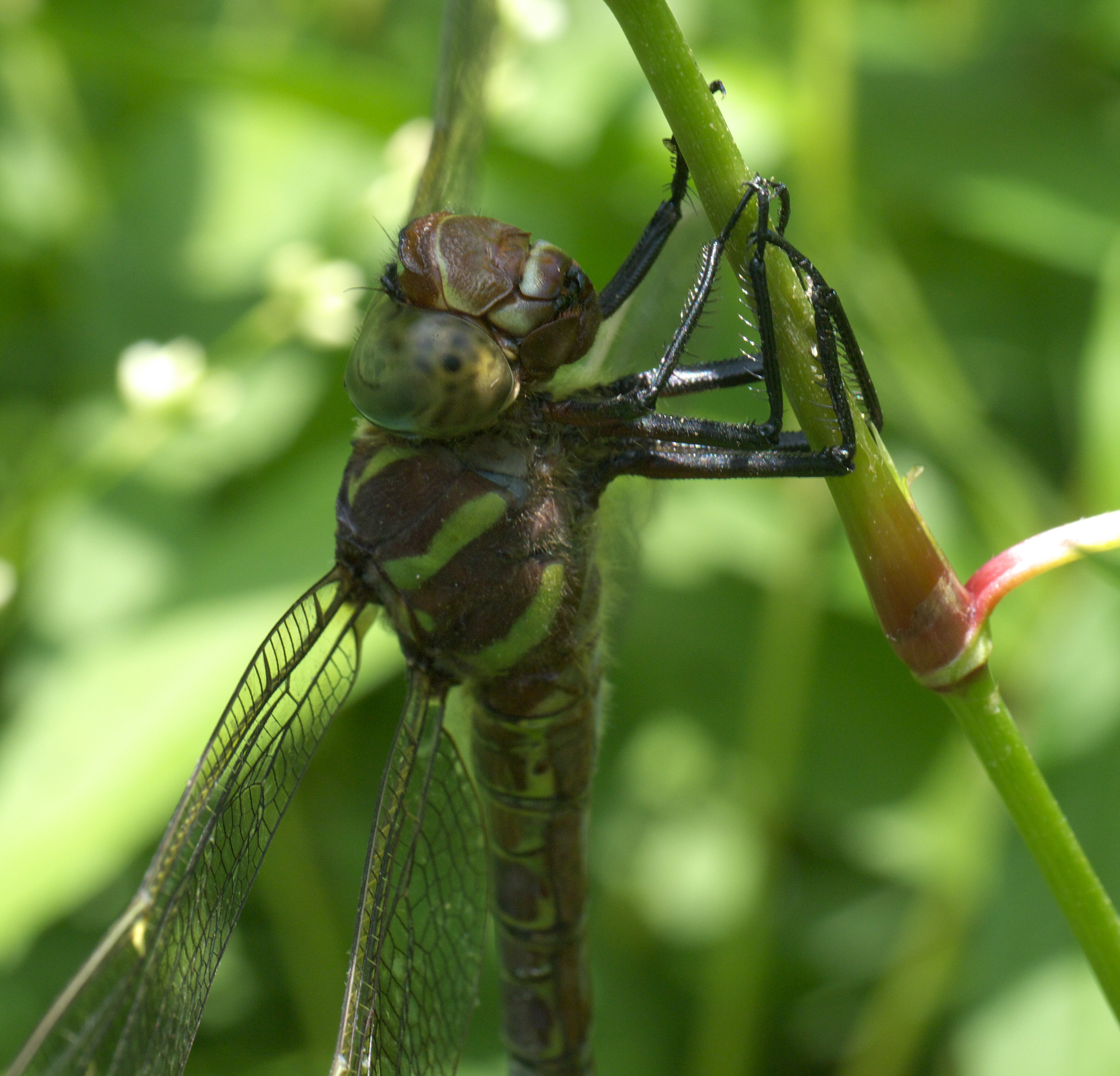
- Epiaeschna heros

Scientific classification
- Kingdom: Animalia
- Phylum: Arthropoda
- Class: Insecta
- Order: Odonata
- Infraorder: Anisoptera
- Family: Aeshnidae
- Genus: Epiaeschna; Hagen in Selys, 1883

= Epiaeschna =

Epiaeschna Temporal range: Middle Eocene to present

Genus of dragonflies

Epiaeschna is a genus of darners in the dragonfly family Aeshnidae. A single extant species, E. heros, is known from eastern North America, in addition to six fossil species known from Eurasia, suggesting the genus had a much wider distribution in the past.

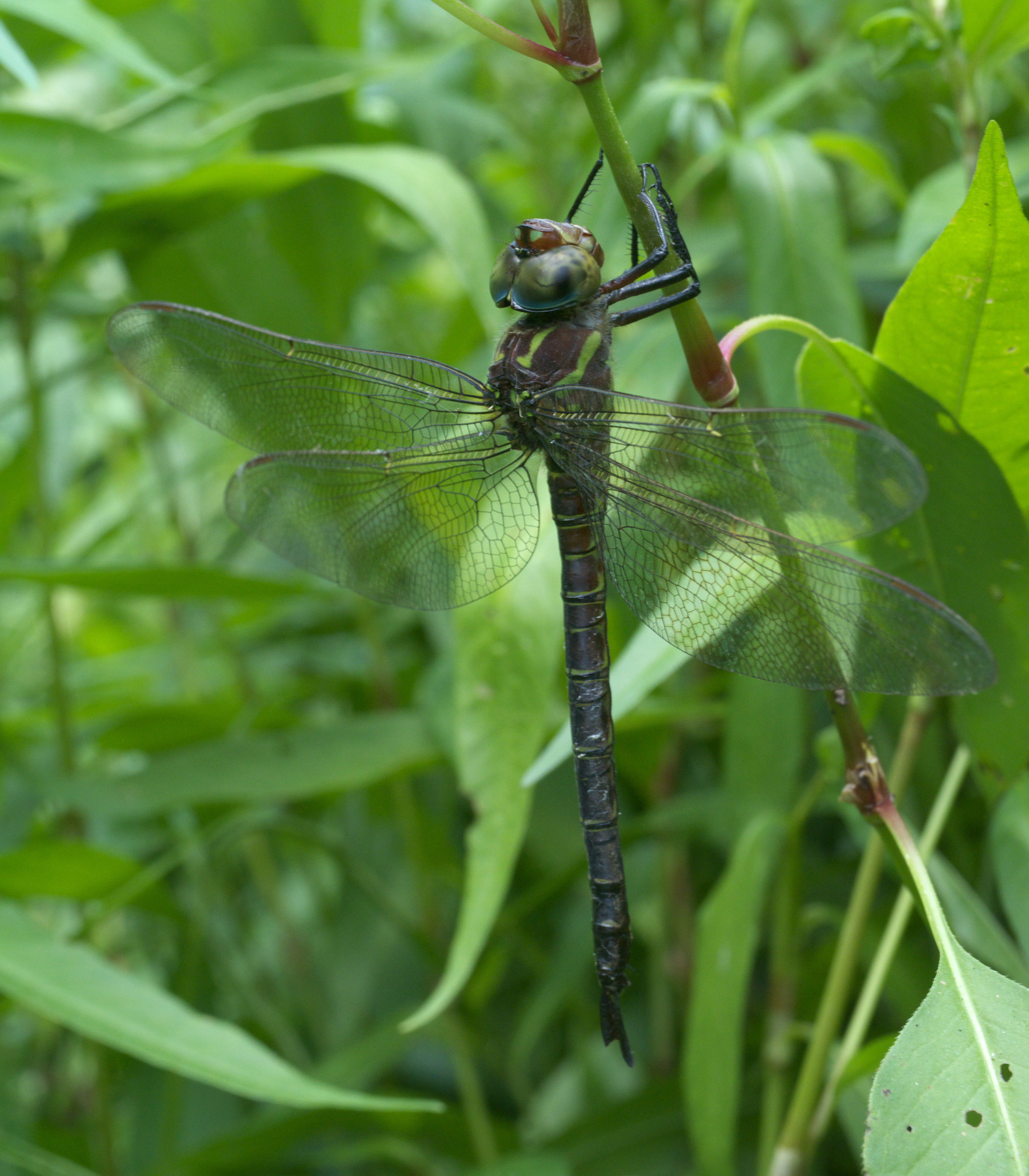
Epiaeschna heros

== Species ==
These seven species belong to the genus Epiaeschna:

- Epiaeschna heros (Fabricius, 1798) (swamp darner)
- †Epiaeschna gossi (Campion, 1916) (Middle Eocene of England)
- †Epiaeschna magnifica (Martynov, 1929) (Late Oligocene of Kazakhstan)
- †Epiaeschna pseudoheros Nel & Petrulevicius, 2010 (Late Oligocene of France)
- †Epiaeschna stauropolitana Martynov, 1927 (mid-Miocene of Crimea)
- †Epiaeschna matutina (Zhang, 1989) (Miocene of China)
- †Epiaeschna wisseri Nel, Poschmann & Wedmann, 2020 (Late Oligocene of Germany)
