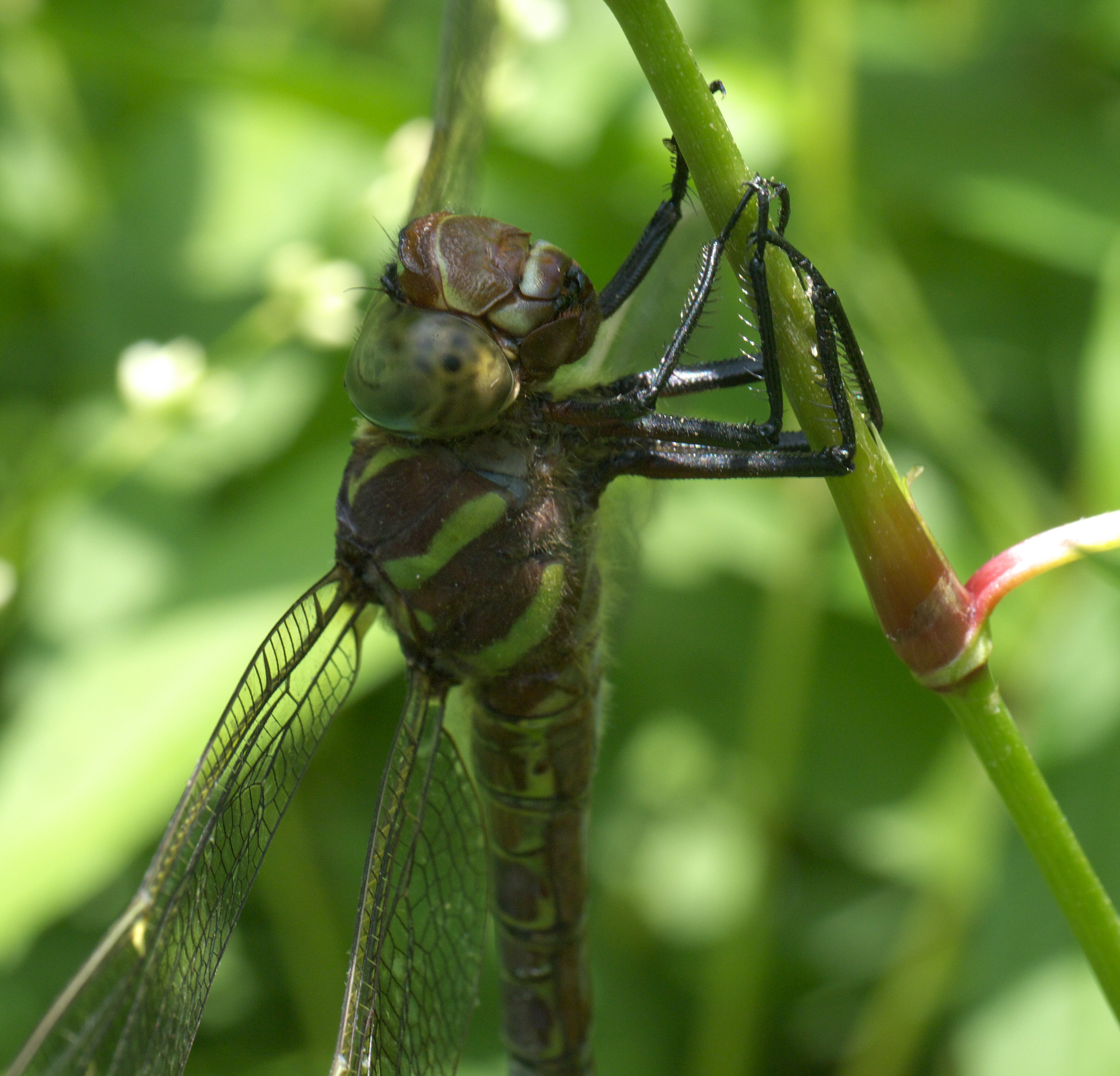

Conservation status
- Least Concern (IUCN 3.1)

Scientific classification
- Kingdom: Animalia
- Phylum: Arthropoda
- Class: Insecta
- Order: Odonata
- Infraorder: Anisoptera
- Family: Aeshnidae
- Genus: Epiaeschna
- Species: E. heros

Binomial name
- Epiaeschna heros (Fabricius, 1798)

= Epiaeschna heros =

Species of dragonfly

Epiaeschna heros, the swamp darner, is a species of darner in the dragonfly family Aeshnidae. It is found in eastern North America. It is the only extant member of the genus Epiaeschna, a genus that is well-represented in fossil specimens found in Eurasia, suggesting a wider distribution during the mid-Cenozoic.

The IUCN conservation status of Epiaeschna heros is "LC", least concern, with no immediate threat to the species' survival. The population is stable. The IUCN status was reviewed in 2017.

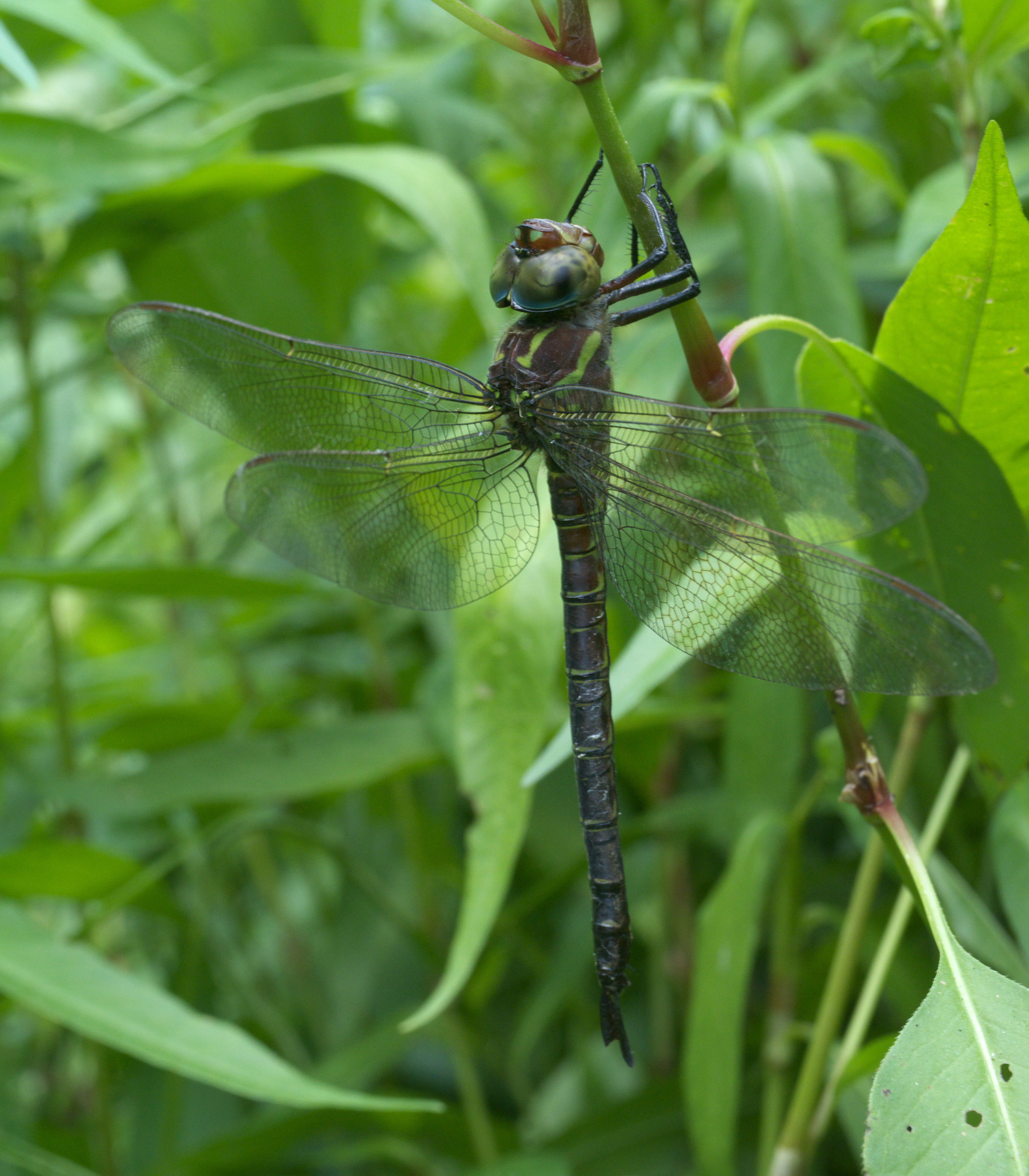
Epiaeschna heros

The species has been witnessed feeding on Solenopsis invicta ants during nuptial flights.
