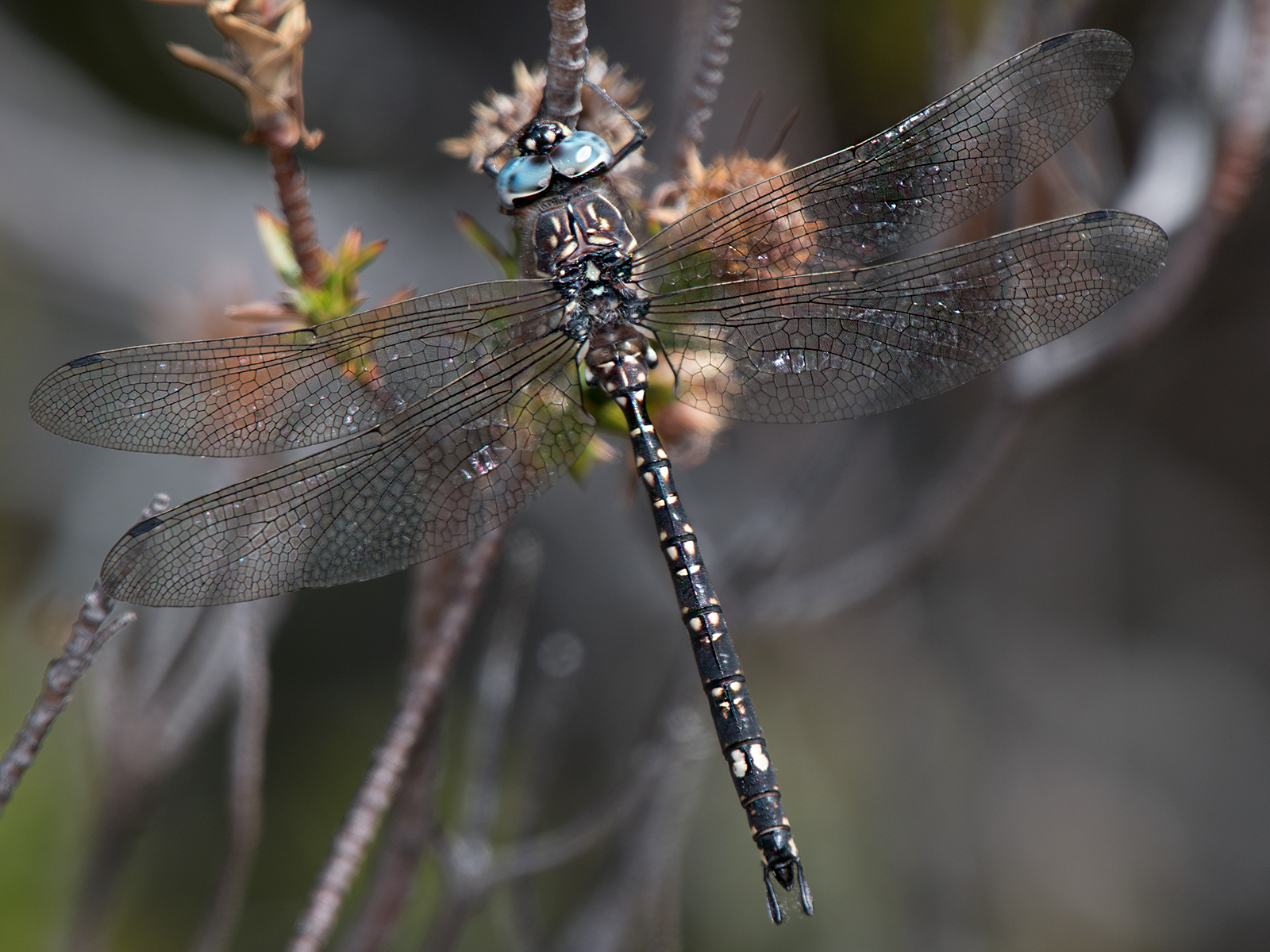
- Male
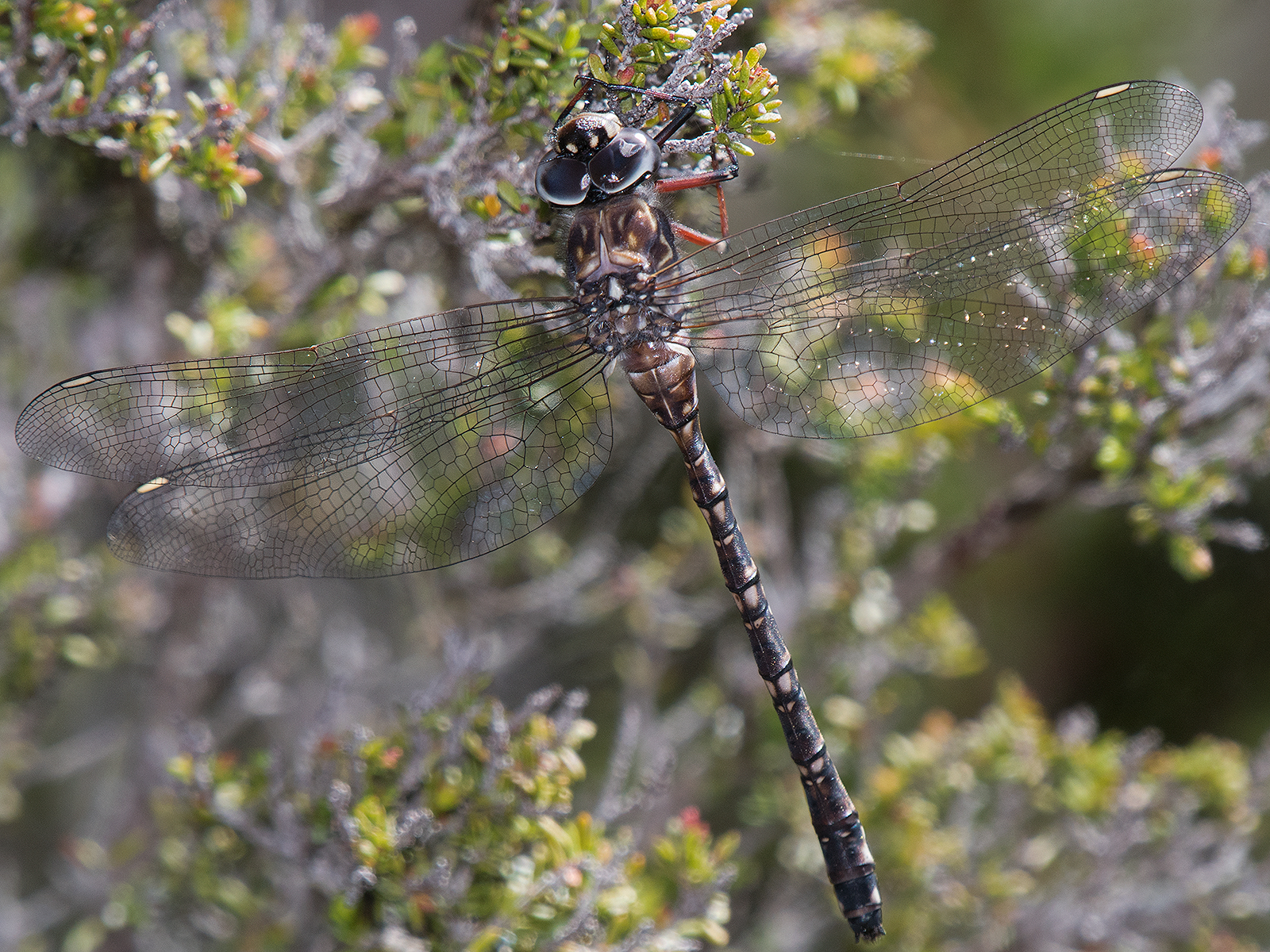
- Female

Conservation status
- Least Concern (IUCN 3.1)

Scientific classification
- Kingdom: Animalia
- Phylum: Arthropoda
- Clade: Pancrustacea
- Class: Insecta
- Order: Odonata
- Suborder: Anisoptera
- Family: Aeshnidae
- Genus: Austroaeschna
- Species: A. parvistigma

Binomial name
- Austroaeschna parvistigma (Selys, 1883)

Synonyms
- Aeschna (Austroaeschna) parvistigma Selys, 1883

= Austroaeschna parvistigma =

Swamp darner

Species of dragonfly

Austroaeschna parvistigma is a species of large dragonfly in the family Aeshnidae, known as the swamp darner. It inhabits heavily vegetated and slow-flowing streams in eastern Australia, from northern New South Wales through Victoria, Tasmania and parts of South Australia.

Austroaeschna parvistigma is a very dark dragonfly with pale markings. It appears similar to the multi-spotted darner, Austroaeschna multipunctata, which inhabits mountain streams of southern New South Wales and eastern Victoria.

== Etymology ==
The genus name Austroaeschna combines the prefix austro- (from Latin auster, meaning “south wind”, hence “southern”) with Aeshna, a genus of dragonflies.

The species name parvistigma is derived from the Latin parvus ("small") and stigma ("spot" or "mark", from Greek στίγμα (stigma)), referring to the short and narrow pterostigma.

== Gallery ==
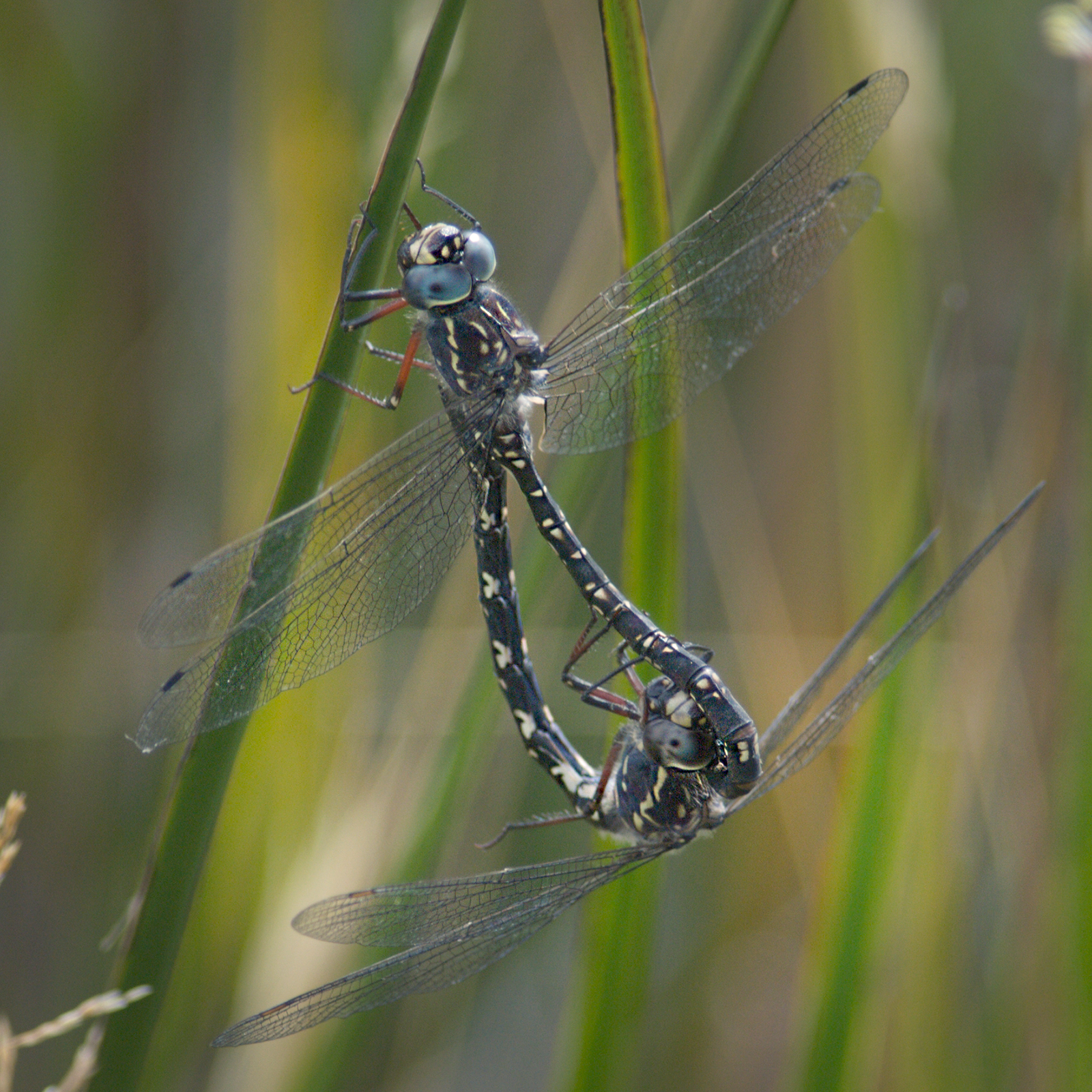
Mating pair

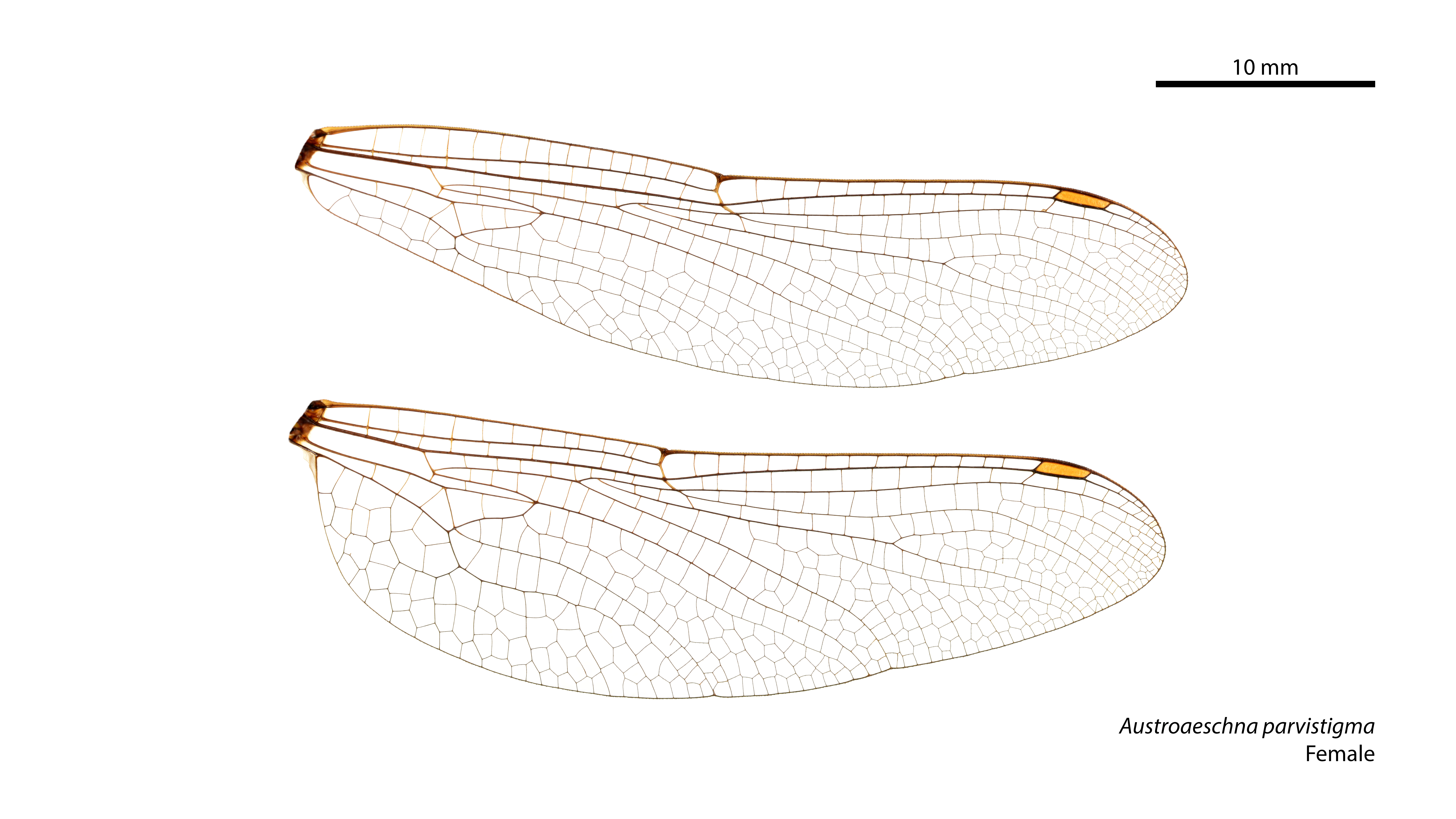
Female wings

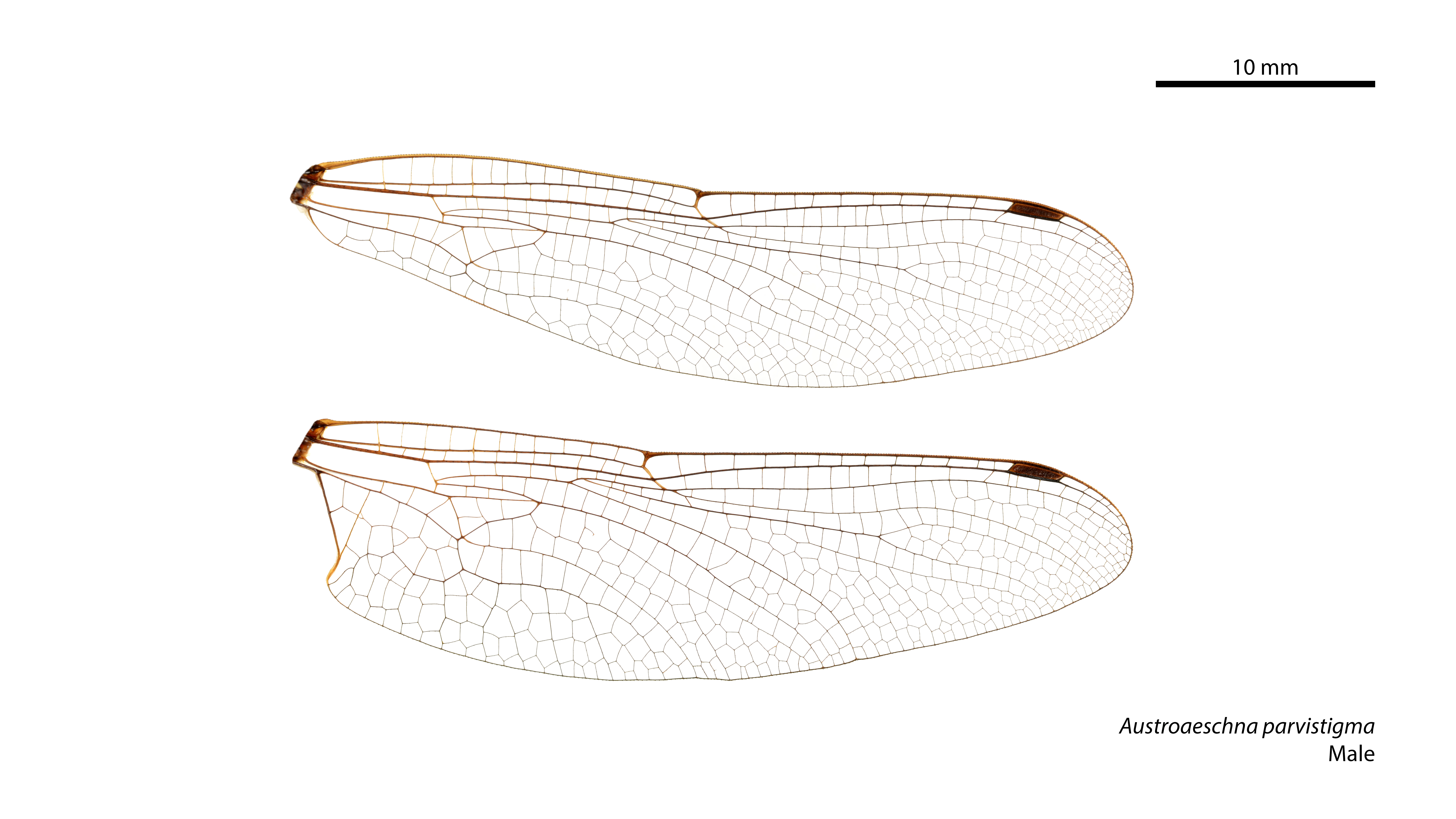
Male wings

== See also ==
- List of dragonflies of Australia
