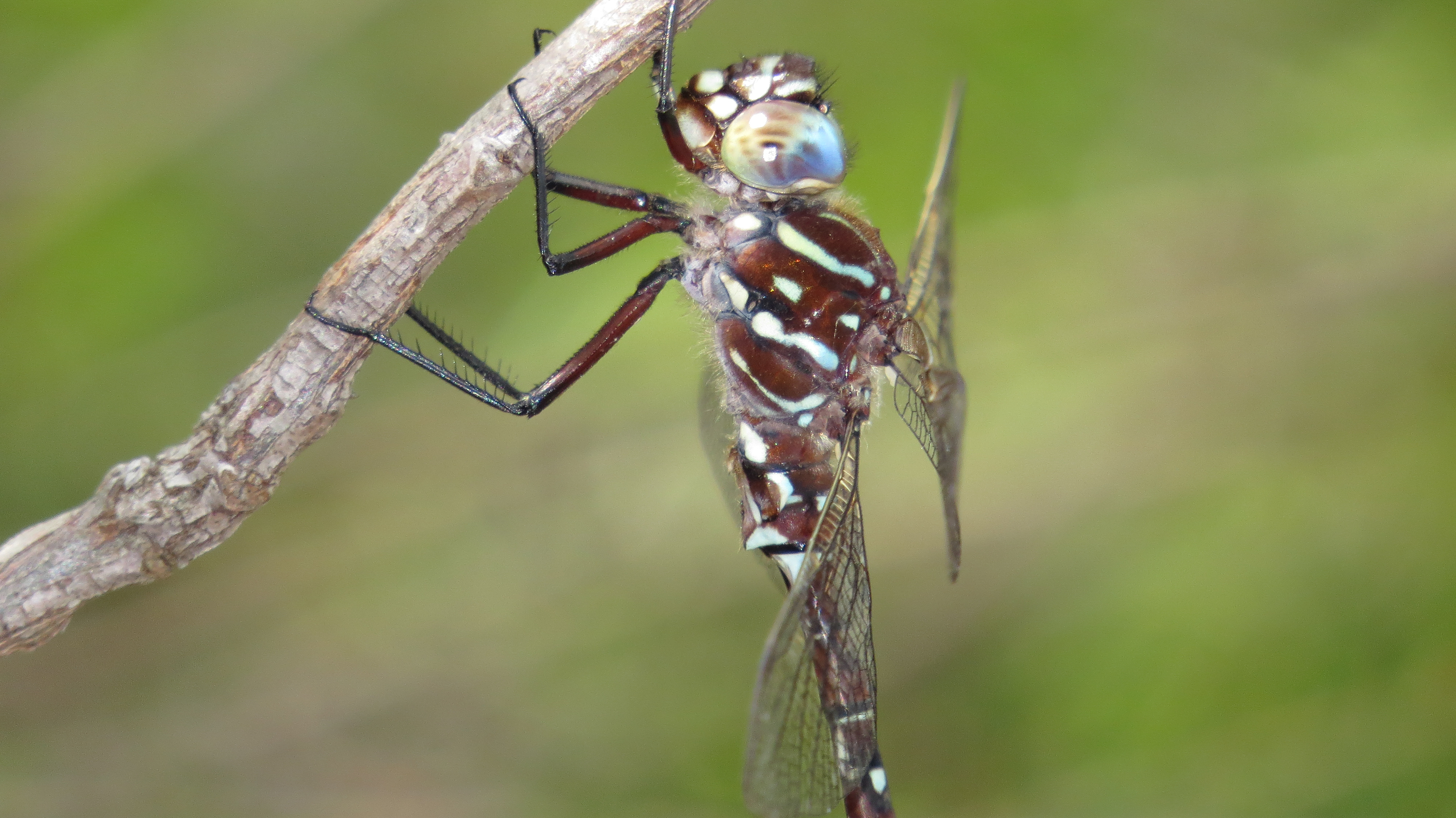
- Male

Conservation status
- Least Concern (IUCN 3.1)

Scientific classification
- Kingdom: Animalia
- Phylum: Arthropoda
- Clade: Pancrustacea
- Class: Insecta
- Order: Odonata
- Suborder: Anisoptera
- Family: Aeshnidae
- Genus: Austroaeschna
- Species: A. unicornis

Binomial name
- Austroaeschna unicornis (Martin, 1901)

Synonyms
- Acanthaeschna unicornis Martin, 1901; Planaeschna longissima Martin, 1901

= Austroaeschna unicornis =

Unicorn darner

Species of dragonfly

Austroaeschna unicornis is a species of dragonfly in the family Aeshnidae, known as the unicorn darner. It is found in eastern Australia, from Brisbane to Tasmania and around Adelaide in South Australia, where it inhabits rivers and streams.

Austroaeschna unicornis is a long-bodied, brown to black dragonfly with pale blue markings.

== Etymology ==
The genus name Austroaeschna combines the prefix austro- (from Latin auster, meaning “south wind”, hence “southern”) with Aeshna, a genus of dragonflies.

The species name unicornis is Latin for "one-horned", referring to a horn-like projection on the back of the female’s head.

== Gallery ==
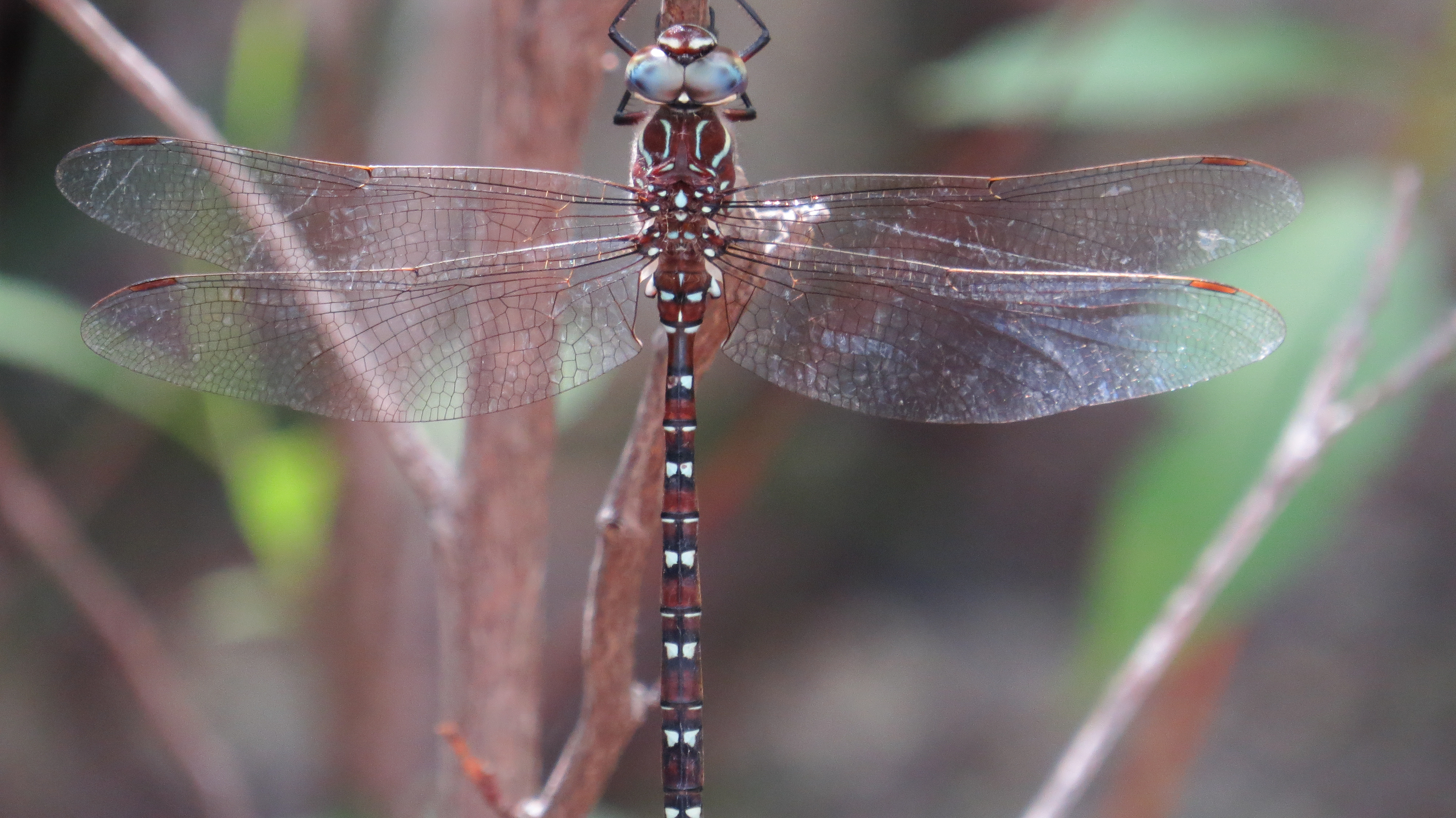
Male wings

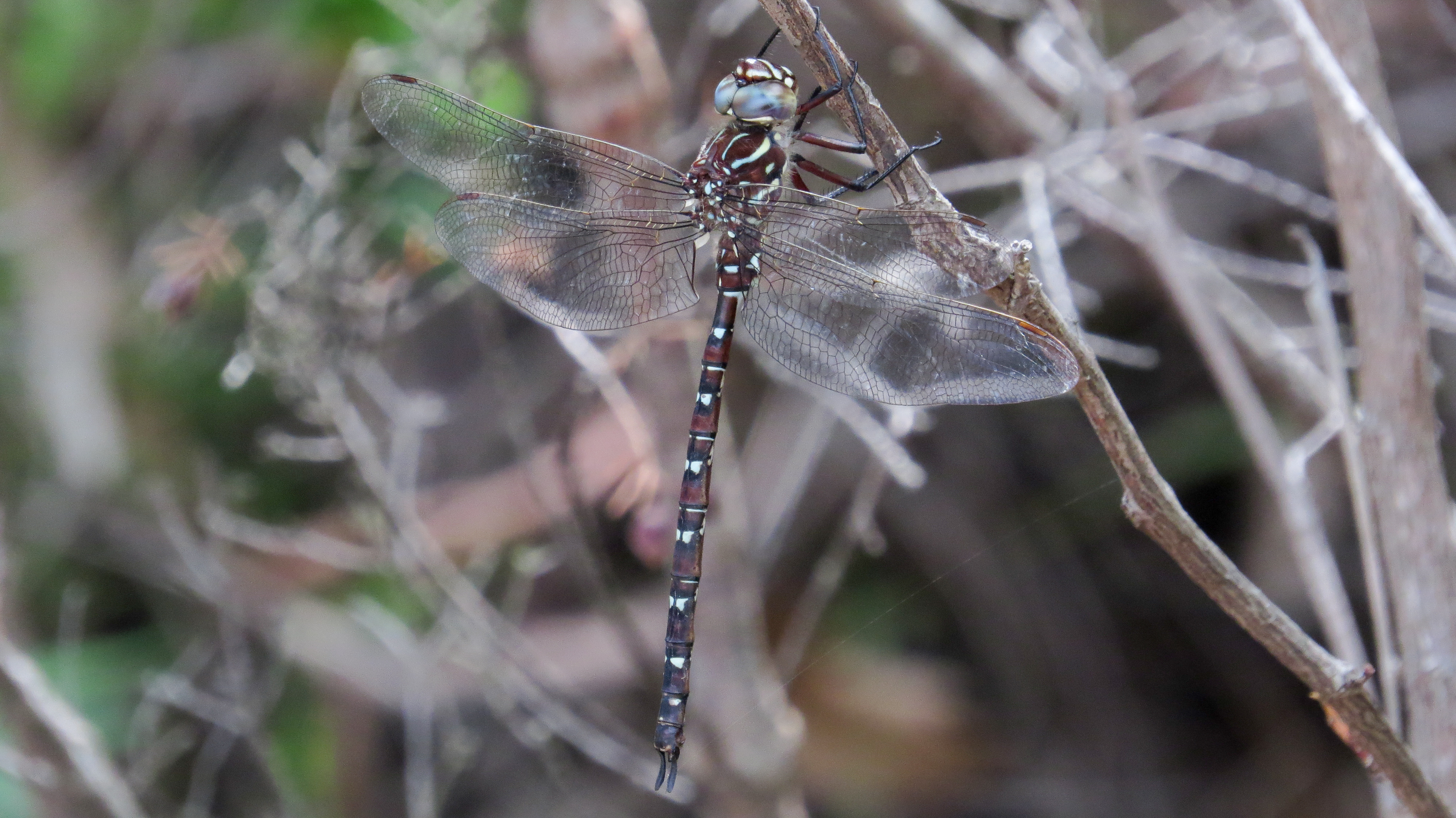
Male, side view

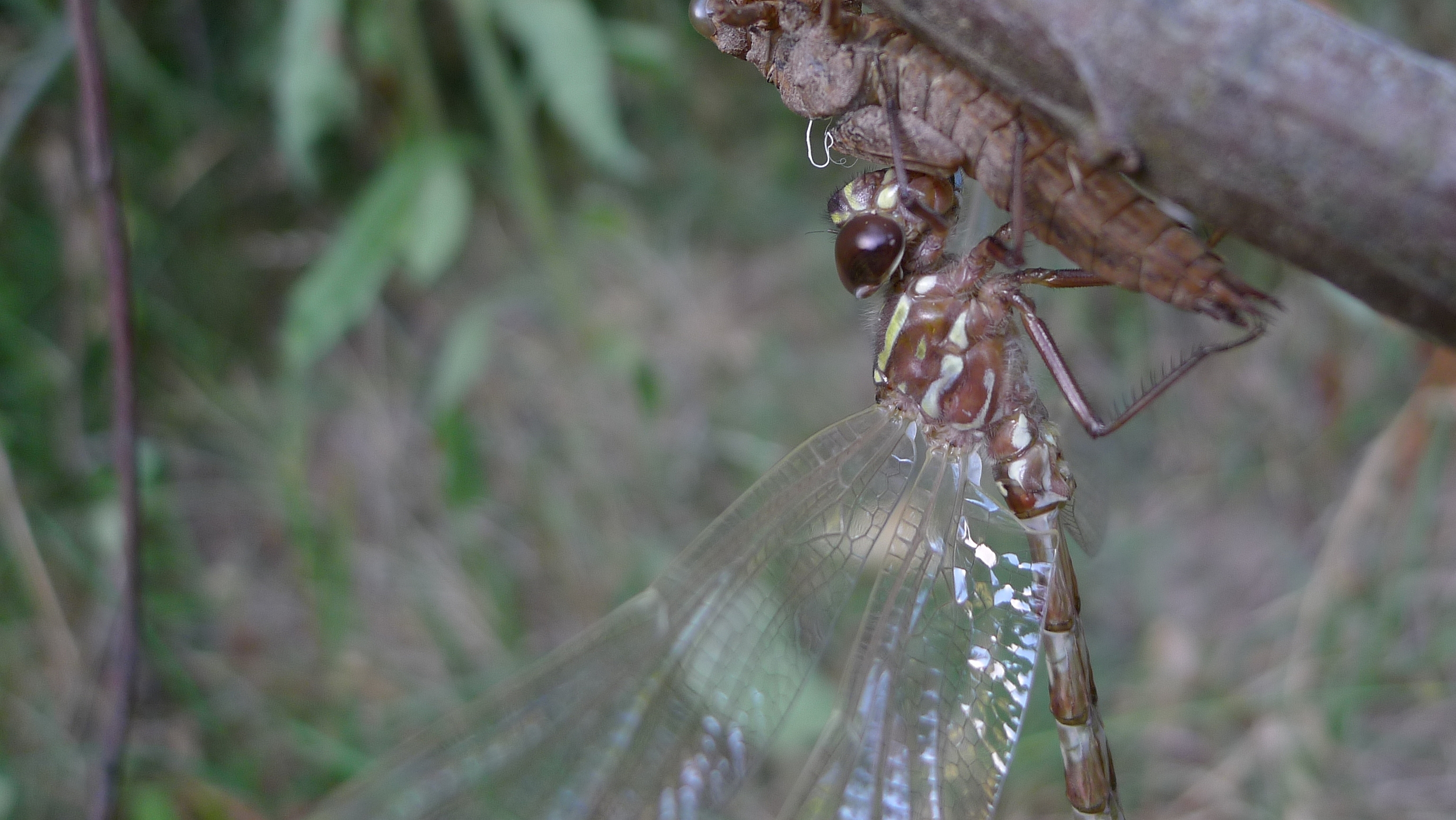
Newly emerged adult

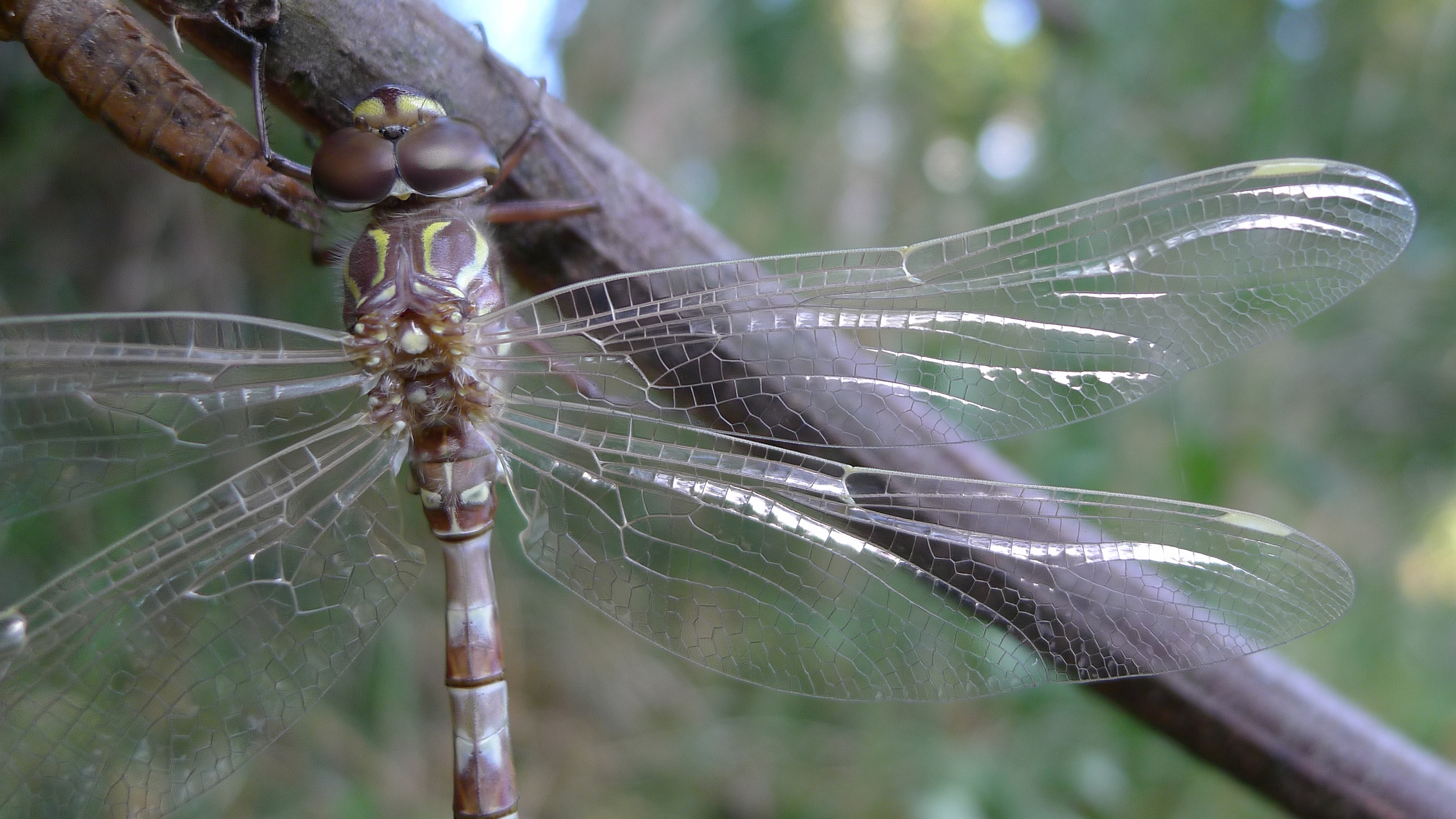
New wings

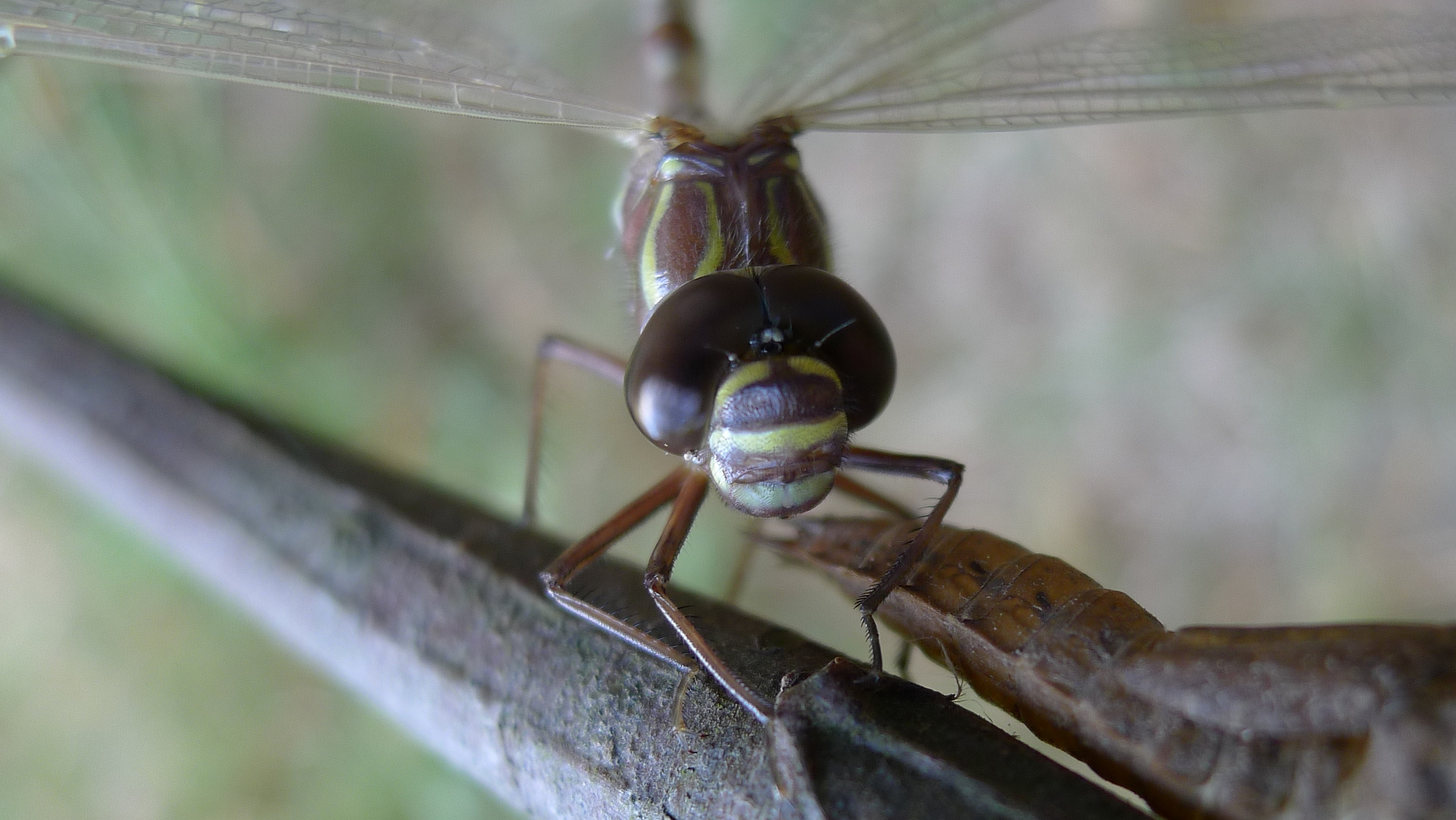
Face

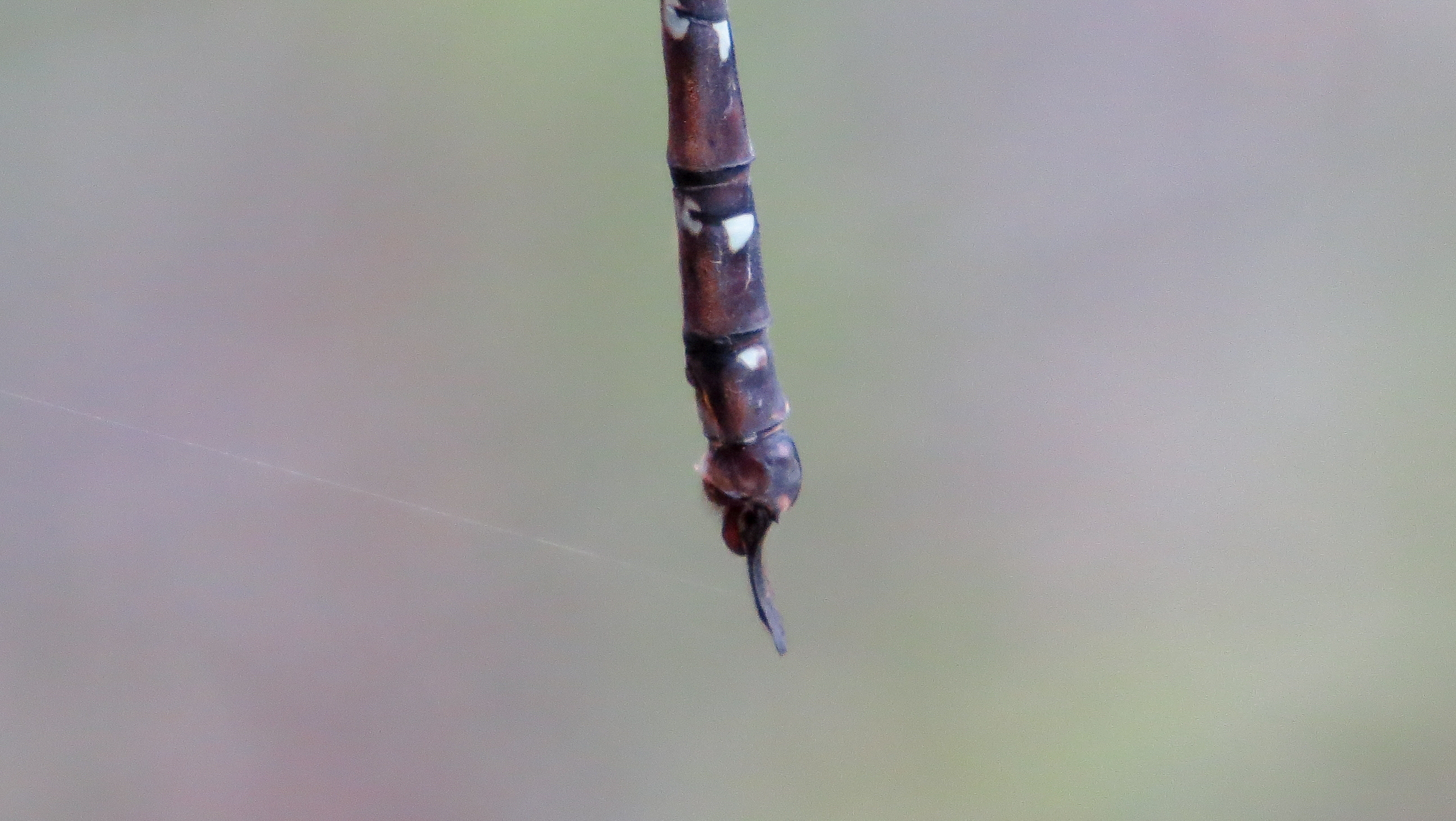
Male tip of tail

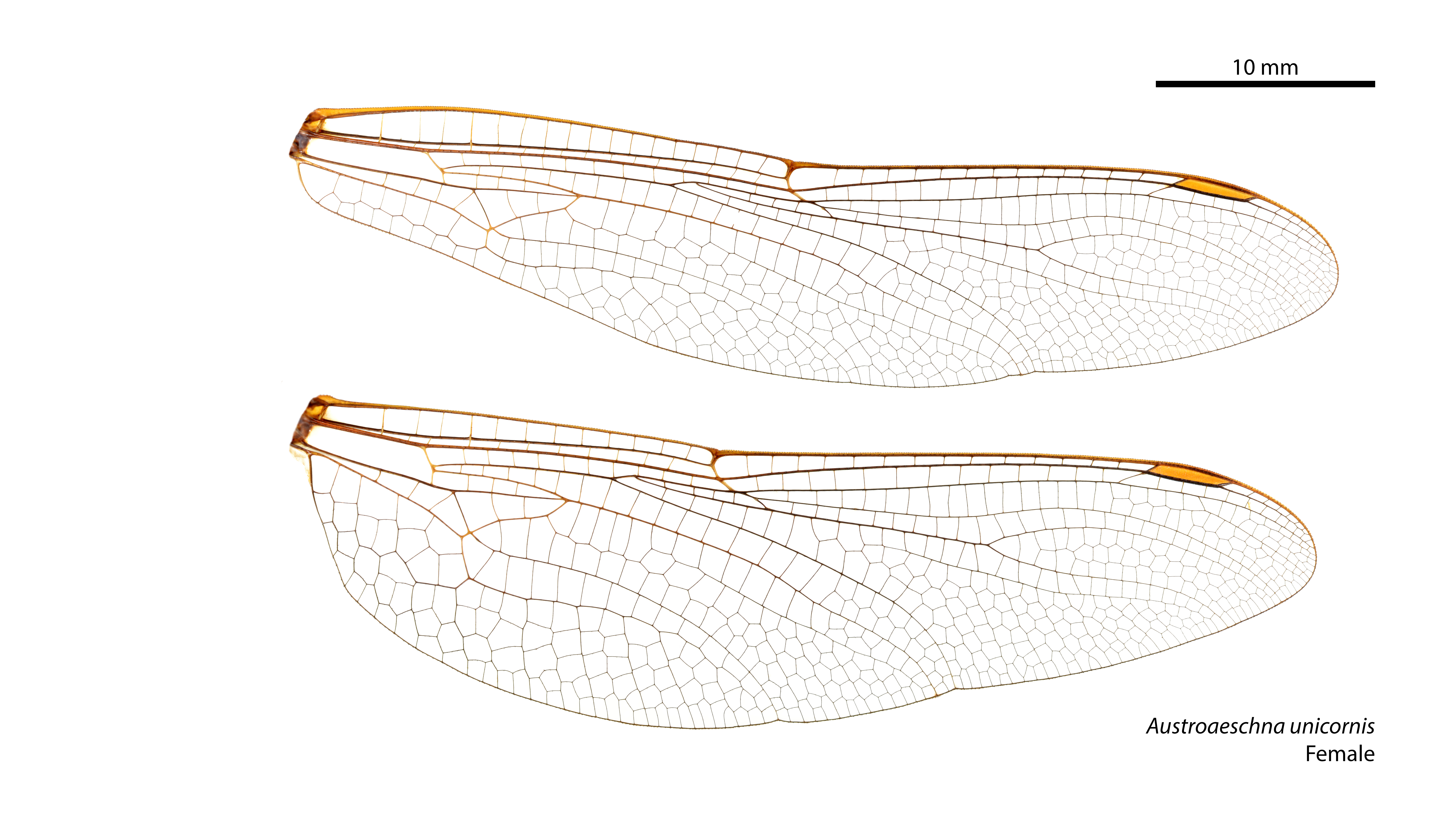
Female wings

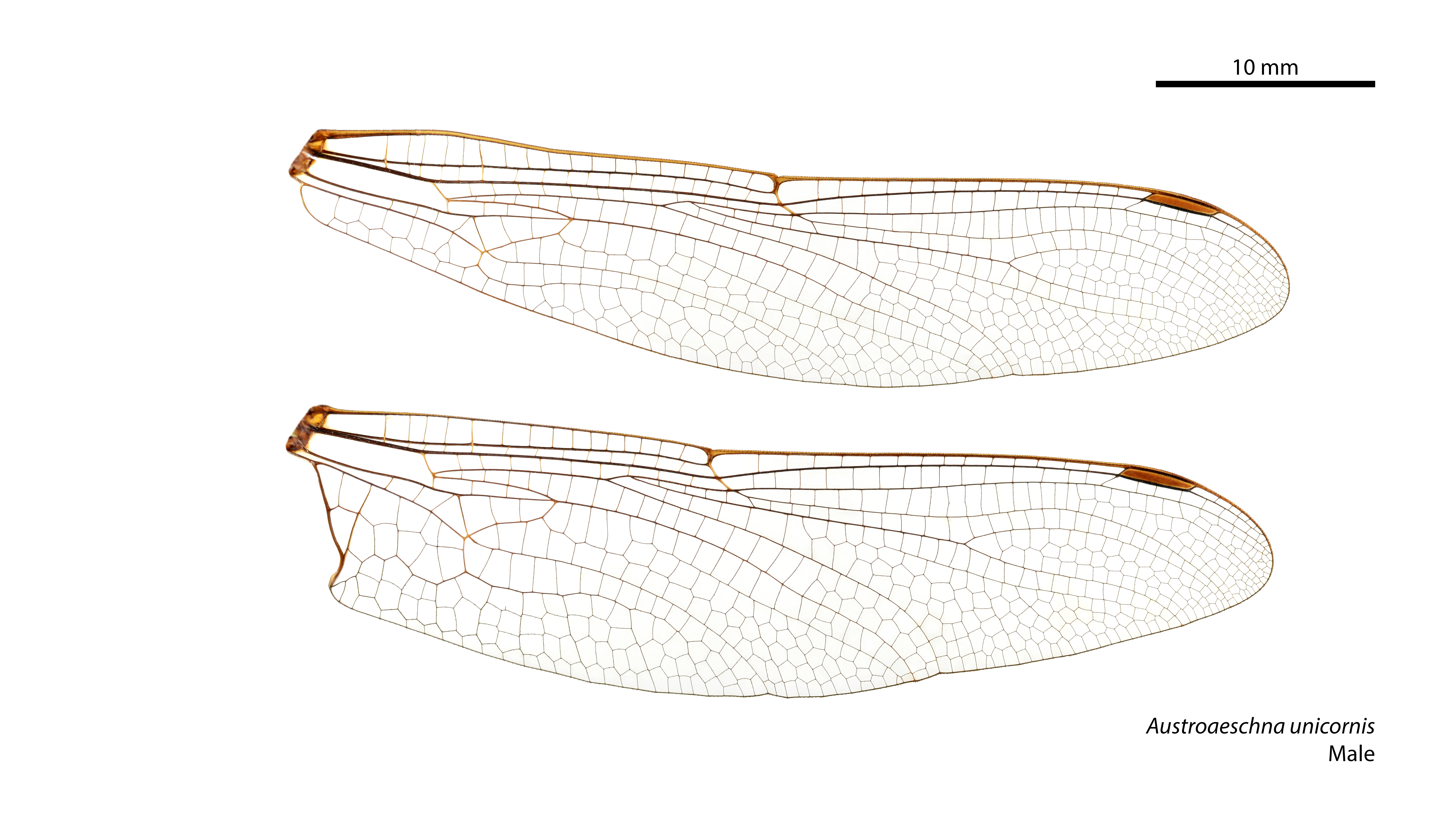
Male wings

== Note ==
Until recently, Austroaeschna pinheyi was considered to be a subspecies of Austroaeschna unicornis.

== See also ==
- List of dragonflies of Australia
