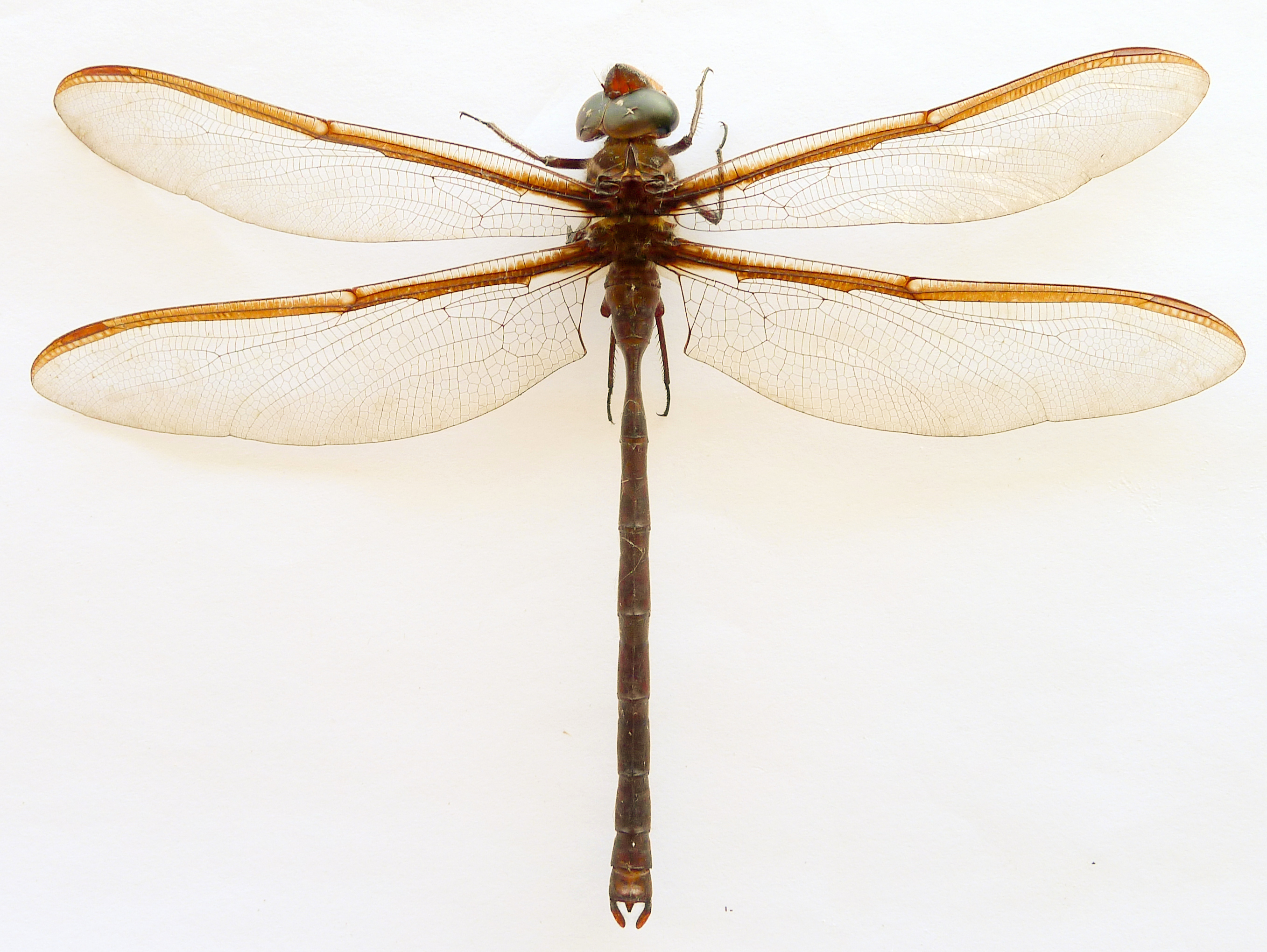
- Austrophlebia costalis

Scientific classification
- Kingdom: Animalia
- Phylum: Arthropoda
- Clade: Pancrustacea
- Class: Insecta
- Order: Odonata
- Suborder: Anisoptera
- Family: Aeshnidae
- Genus: Austrophlebia; Tillyard, 1916

= Austrophlebia =

Genus of dragonflies

Austrophlebia is a small genus of dragonflies in the family Aeshnidae. Species of this dragonfly are very large with strong yellow markings on the thorax. They are endemic to eastern Australia.

== Species ==
The genus contains two species:

- Austrophlebia costalis (Tillyard, 1907) – southern giant darner
- Austrophlebia subcostalis Theischinger, 1996 – northern giant darner

== Etymology ==
The genus name Austrophlebia combines austro- (from Latin auster, meaning “south wind”, hence “southern”) with -phlebia, from Greek φλέψ (phleps, “vein”).

In 1916, Tillyard noted that the genus was closely allied to Telephlebia and Austroaeschna, and the name reflects this relationship by incorporating elements of both.
