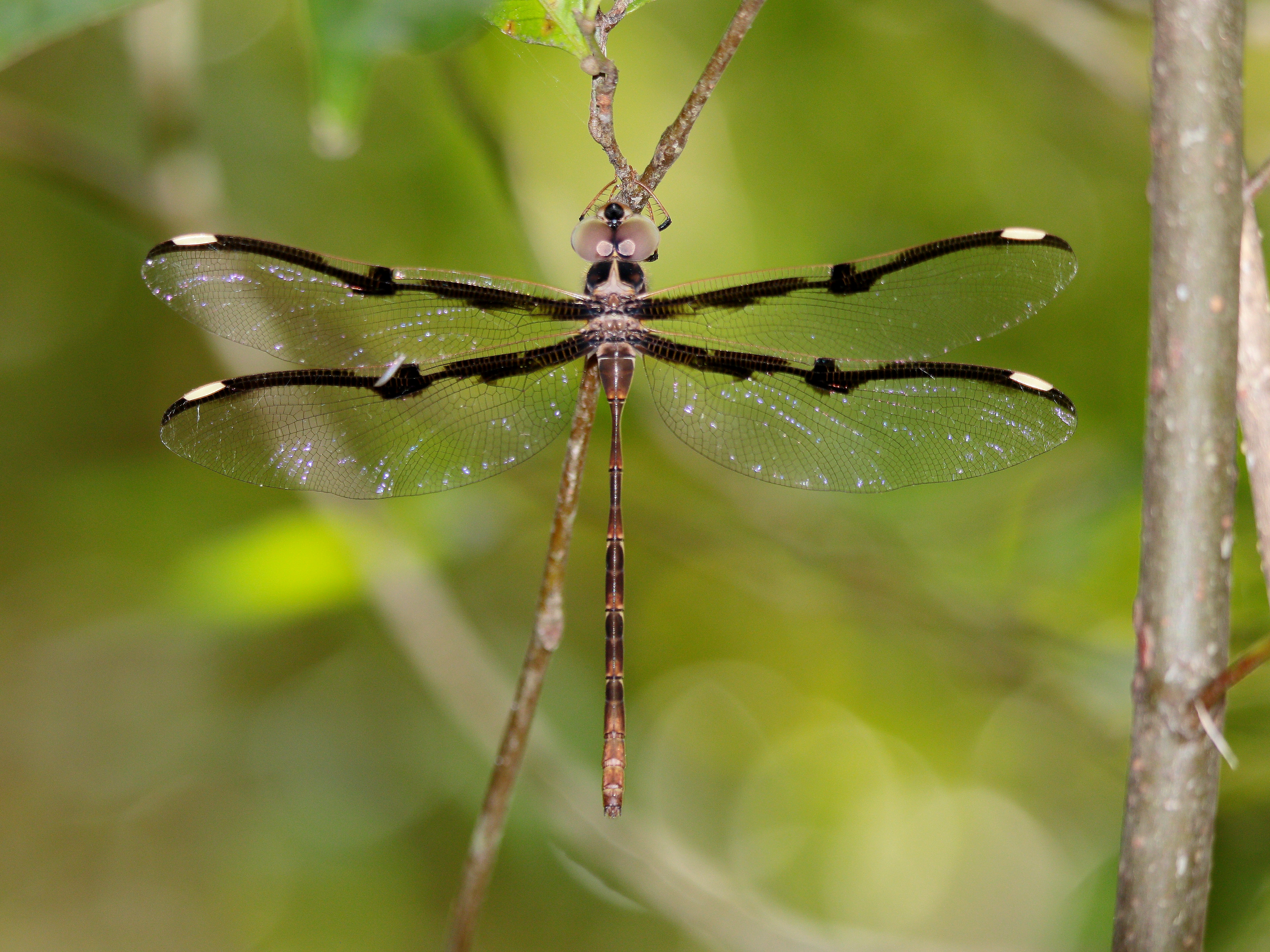
- North Queensland, Australia

Conservation status
- Near Threatened (IUCN 3.1)

Scientific classification
- Kingdom: Animalia
- Phylum: Arthropoda
- Clade: Pancrustacea
- Class: Insecta
- Order: Odonata
- Suborder: Anisoptera
- Family: Aeshnidae
- Genus: Telephlebia
- Species: T. tillyardi

Binomial name
- Telephlebia tillyardi Campion, 1916

Synonyms
- Telephlebia mjobergi Sjöstedt, 1917

= Telephlebia tillyardi =

Tropical evening darner

Species of dragonfly

Telephlebia tillyardi is a species of dragonfly in the family Aeshnidae, known as the tropical evening darner. It is a medium to large, dark chestnut brown dragonfly with dark markings on the leading edge of its wings. It is endemic to north-eastern Australia, where it inhabits stream margins, and flies at dusk.

Telephlebia tillyardi appears similar to Telephlebia tryoni.

== Etymology ==
The genus name Telephlebia is derived from the Greek τῆλε (tēle, "at a distance") and φλέψ (phleps, "vein"), referring to the unusually elongated vein near the leading edge of the wing.

In 1916, Herbert Campion named this species tillyardi, an eponym honouring his friend, the entomologist Robert John Tillyard (1881–1937), in recognition of his contributions to the study of Australian dragonflies.

== Gallery ==
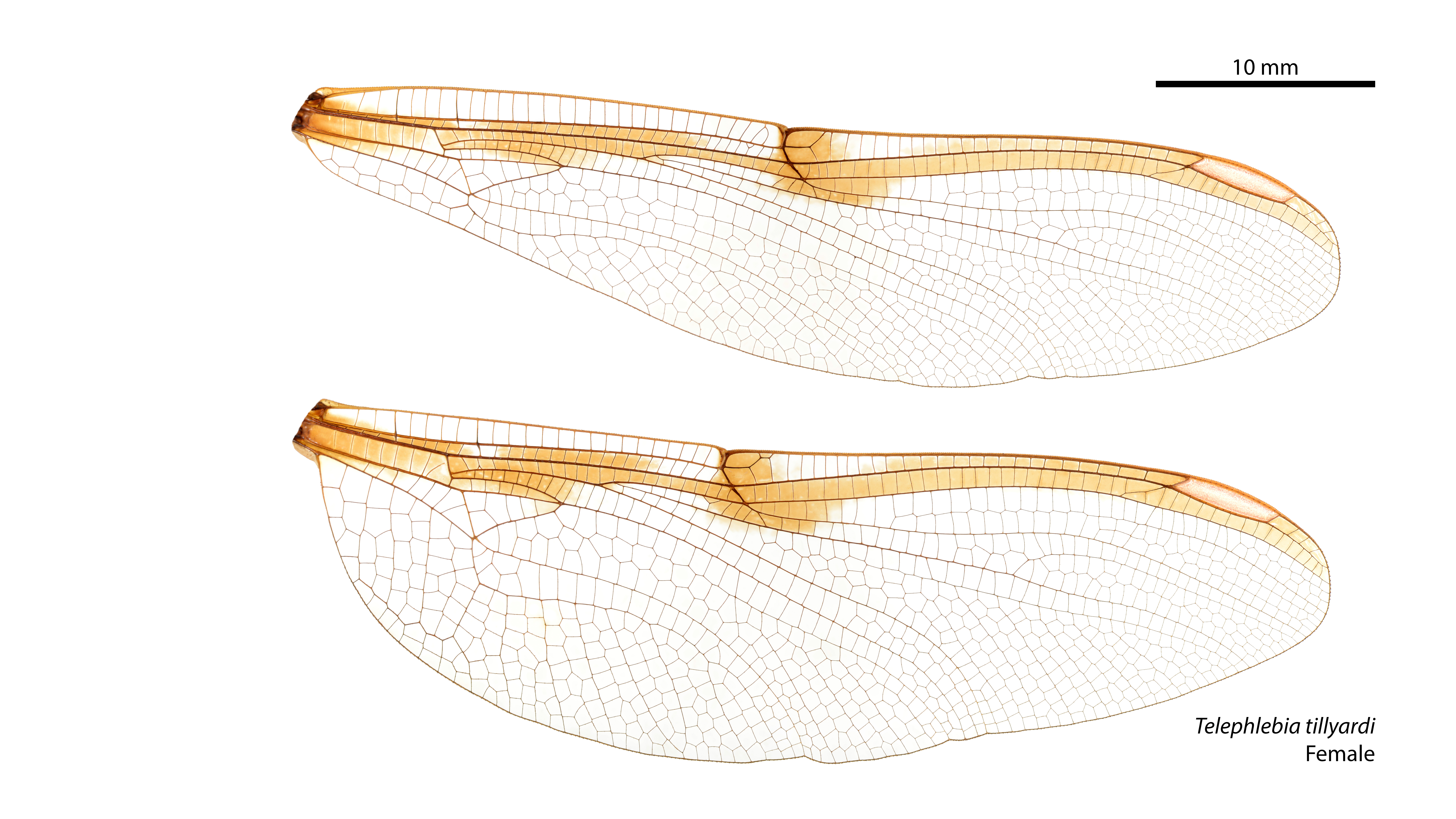
Female wings

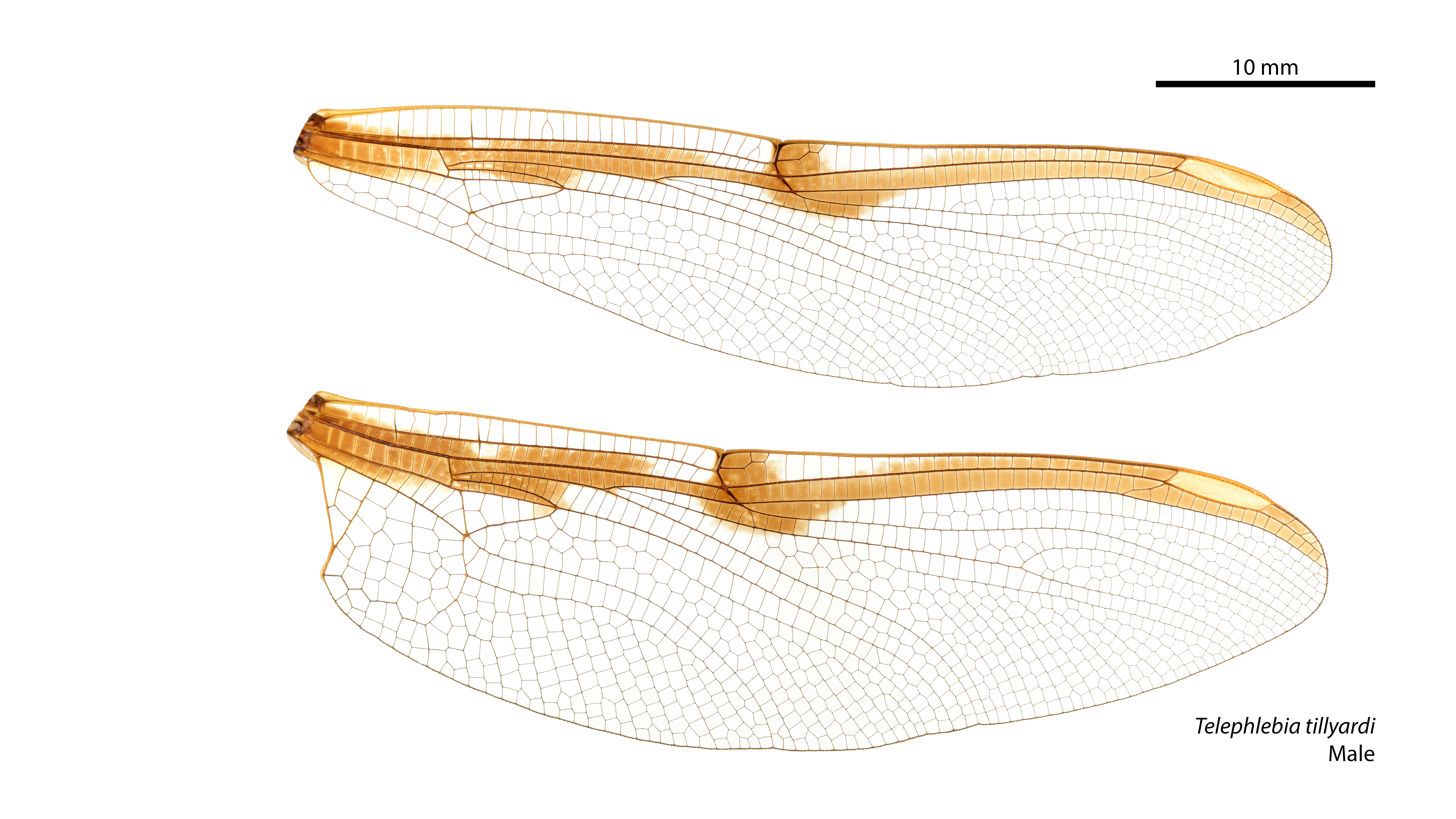
Male wings

== See also ==
- List of Odonata species of Australia
