= Telephlebia cyclops =

Northern evening darner

Conservation status
- Least Concern (IUCN 3.1)

Scientific classification
- Kingdom: Animalia
- Phylum: Arthropoda
- Clade: Pancrustacea
- Class: Insecta
- Order: Odonata
- Suborder: Anisoptera
- Family: Aeshnidae
- Genus: Telephlebia
- Species: T. cyclops

Binomial name
- Telephlebia cyclops Tillyard, 1916

Species of dragonfly

Telephlebia cyclops is a species of dragonfly in the family Aeshnidae, known as the northern evening darner. It is a medium to large, dark chestnut brown dragonfly with dark markings on the leading edge of its wings. It is endemic to eastern Australia, where it has been found at tropical waterfalls, and flies at dusk.

Telephlebia cyclops appears similar to Telephlebia godeffroyi.

== Etymology ==
The genus name Telephlebia is derived from the Greek τῆλε (tēle, "at a distance") and φλέψ (phleps, "vein"), referring to the unusually elongated vein near the leading edge of the wing.

The species name cyclops refers to a Cyclops, a one-eyed being of Greek mythology, likely alluding to the large rounded marking on the front of the head.

== Gallery ==
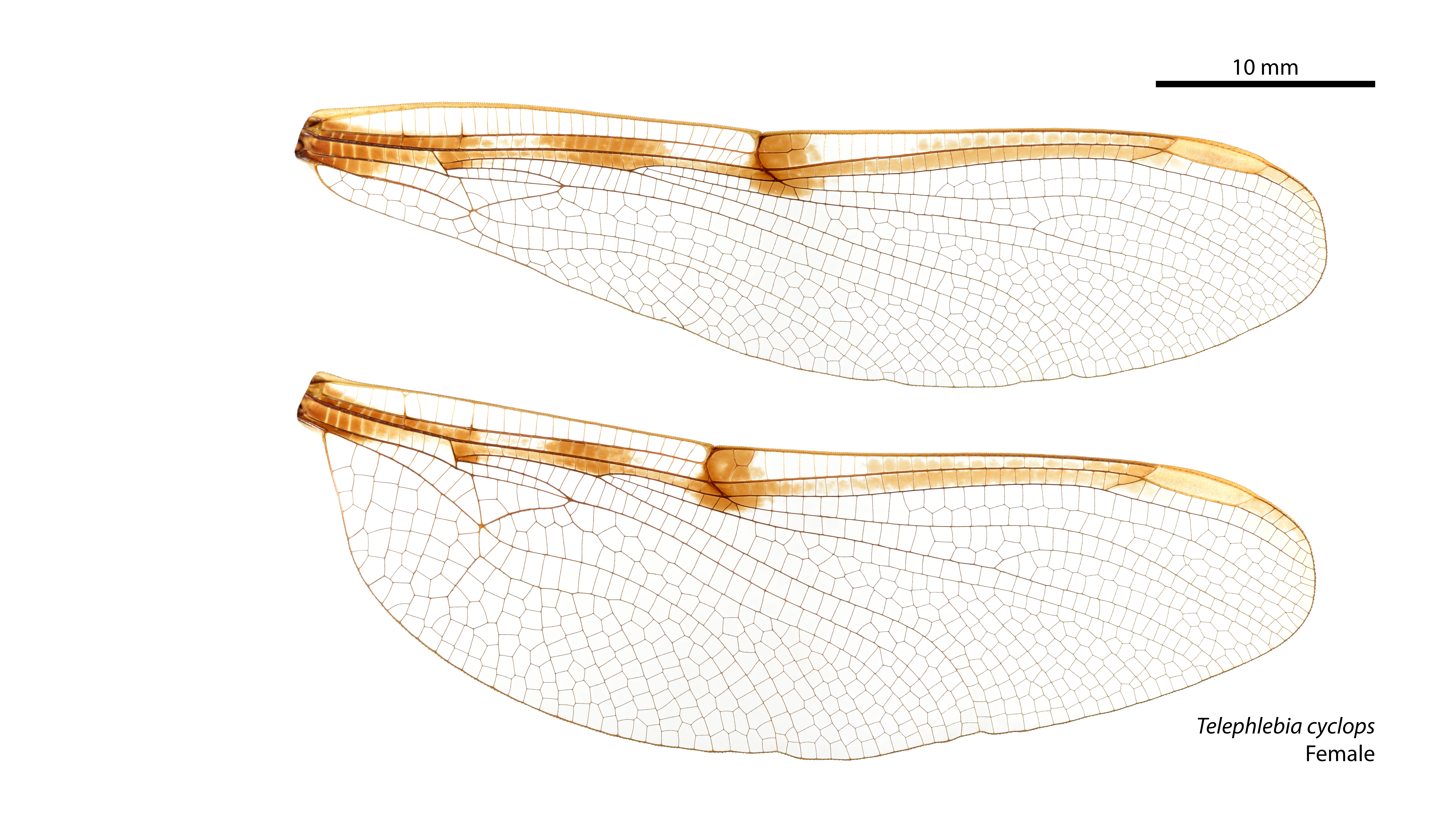
Female wings

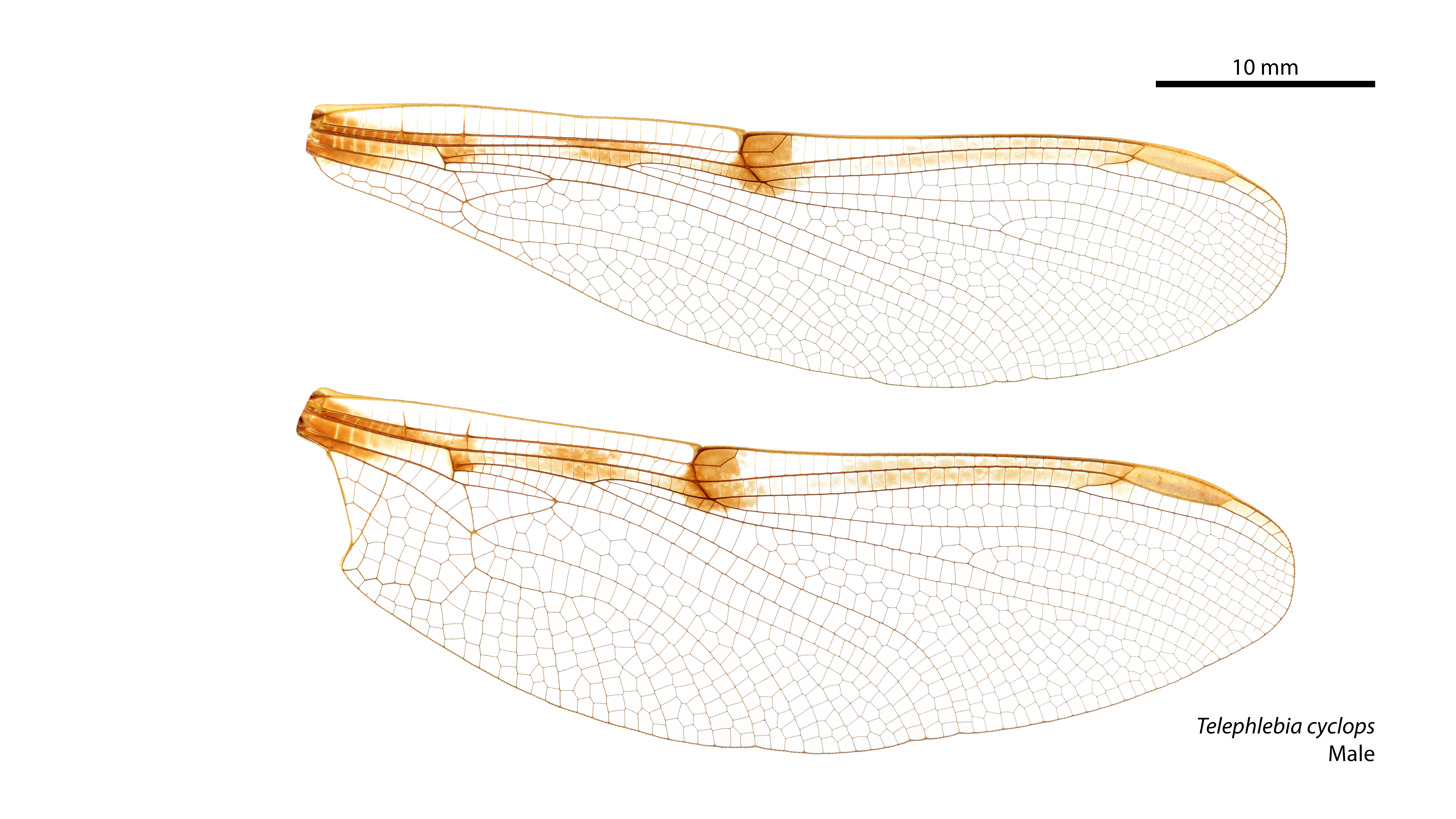
Male wings

== See also ==
- List of Odonata species of Australia
