= Telephlebia brevicauda =

Southern evening darner

Conservation status
- Least Concern (IUCN 3.1)

Scientific classification
- Kingdom: Animalia
- Phylum: Arthropoda
- Clade: Pancrustacea
- Class: Insecta
- Order: Odonata
- Suborder: Anisoptera
- Family: Aeshnidae
- Genus: Telephlebia
- Species: T. brevicauda

Binomial name
- Telephlebia brevicauda Tillyard, 1916

Species of dragonfly

Telephlebia brevicauda is a species of dragonfly in the family Aeshnidae, known as the southern evening darner. It is a medium to large, dark chestnut brown dragonfly with dark markings on the leading edge of its wings. It is endemic to eastern Australia, occurring in alpine New South Wales and Victoria, where it inhabits boggy areas, and flies at dusk.

Telephlebia brevicauda appears similar to Telephlebia godeffroyi.

== Etymology ==
The genus name Telephlebia is derived from the Greek τῆλε (tēle, "at a distance") and φλέψ (phleps, "vein"), referring to the unusually elongated vein near the leading edge of the wing.

The species name brevicauda is derived from the Latin brevis ("short") and cauda ("tail"), likely referring to the appendages being shorter than those of Telephlebia godeffroyi.

== Gallery ==
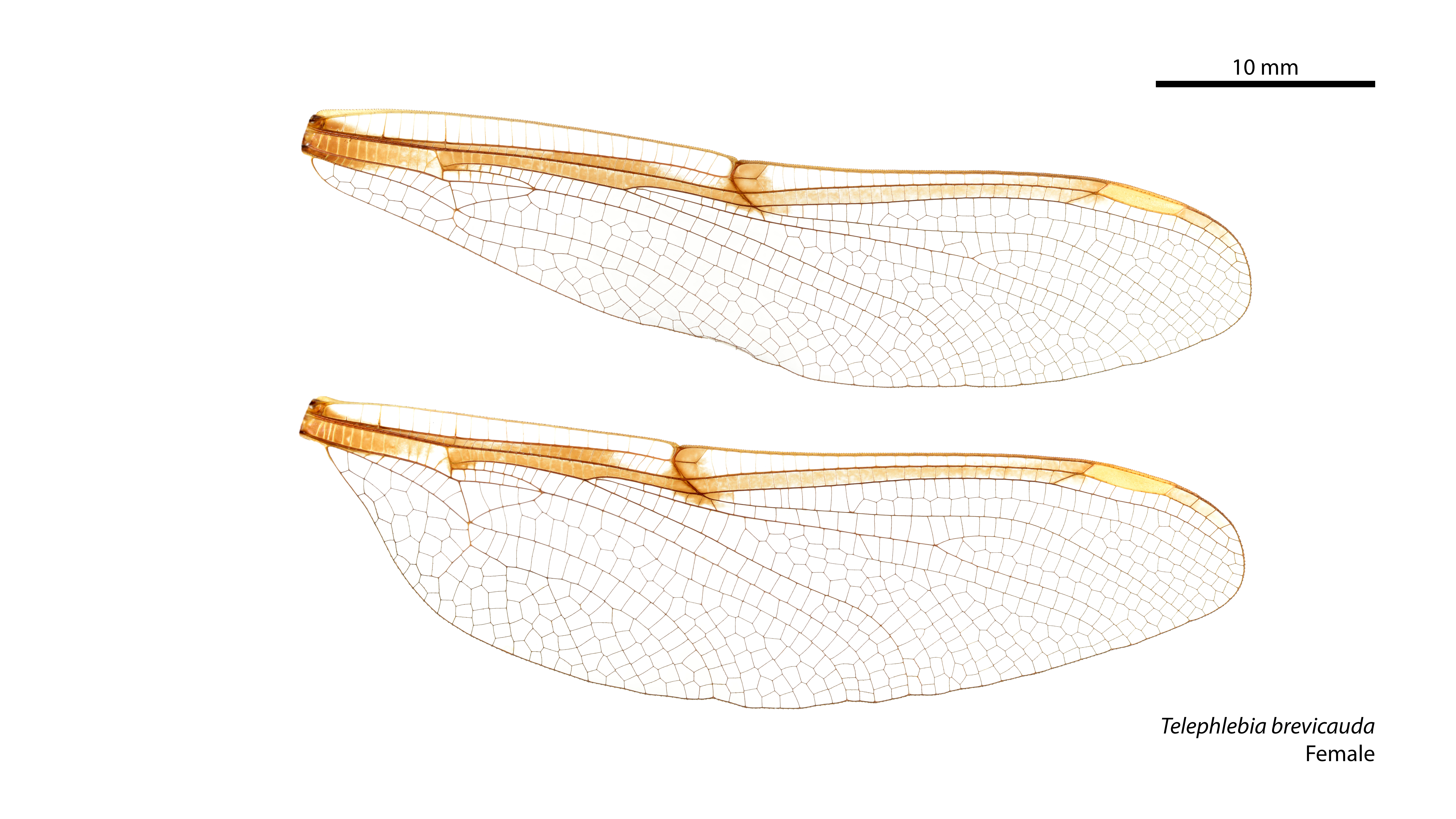
Female wings

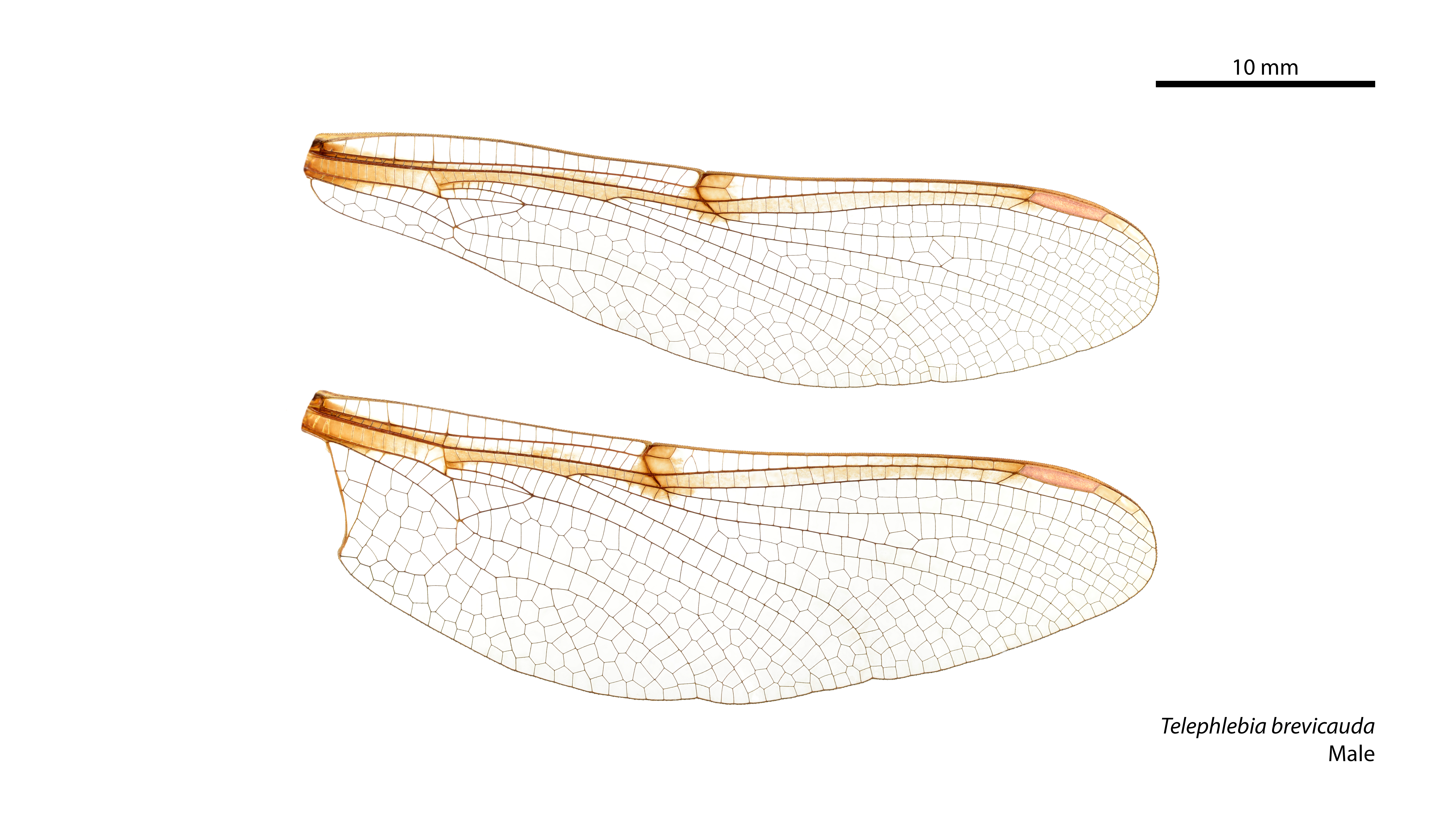
Male wings

== See also ==
- List of Odonata species of Australia
