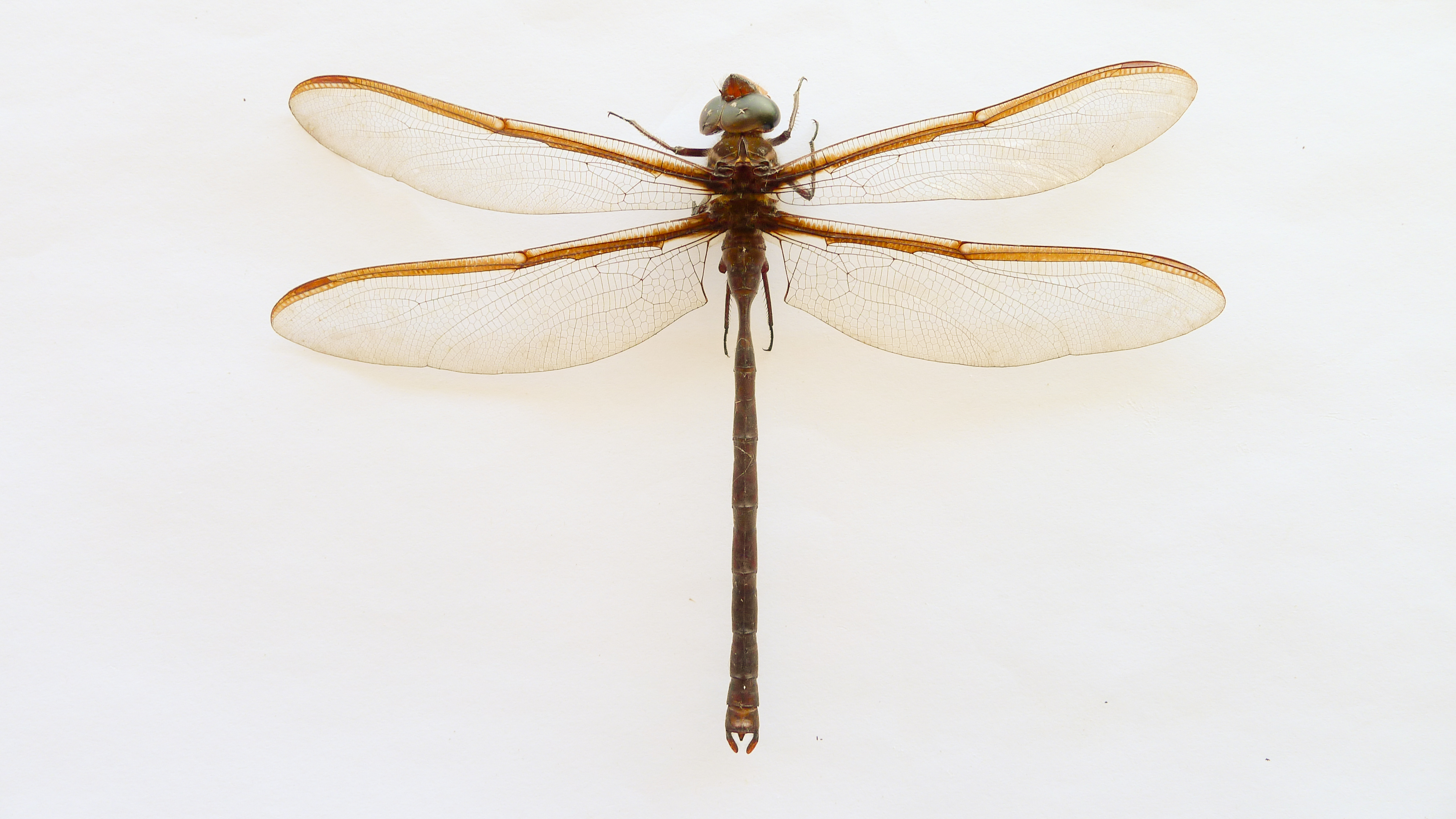
- Male

Conservation status
- Least Concern (IUCN 3.1)

Scientific classification
- Kingdom: Animalia
- Phylum: Arthropoda
- Clade: Pancrustacea
- Class: Insecta
- Order: Odonata
- Suborder: Anisoptera
- Family: Aeshnidae
- Genus: Austrophlebia
- Species: A. costalis

Binomial name
- Austrophlebia costalis (Tillyard, 1907)

Synonyms
- Planaeschna costalis Tillyard, 1907; Telephlebia racleayi Martin, 1909

= Austrophlebia costalis =

Southern giant darner

Species of dragonfly

Austrophlebia costalis, the southern giant darner, is a species of dragonfly in the family Aeshnidae endemic to eastern Australia.

Austrophlebia costalis is an enormous dark dragonfly with strong yellow markings on its body and a brown band along the leading edge of its wings. It inhabits streams and may be found on logs in shady areas.

This species is believed to be one of the fastest flying odonates, with an old reference claiming to have clocked one at nearly 60 miles per hour (97 km/h) but no modern confirmation.

== Etymology ==
The genus name Austrophlebia combines austro- (Latin auster, “southern”) with -phlebia, from Greek φλέψ (phleps, “vein”), reflecting its relationship to Telephlebia and Austroaeschna.

The species name costalis is derived from the Latin costa ("rib") and the suffix -alis ("pertaining to"), referring to the distinctive russet-brown colouring alongside the costa, the leading longitudinal vein of the wing.

== Gallery ==
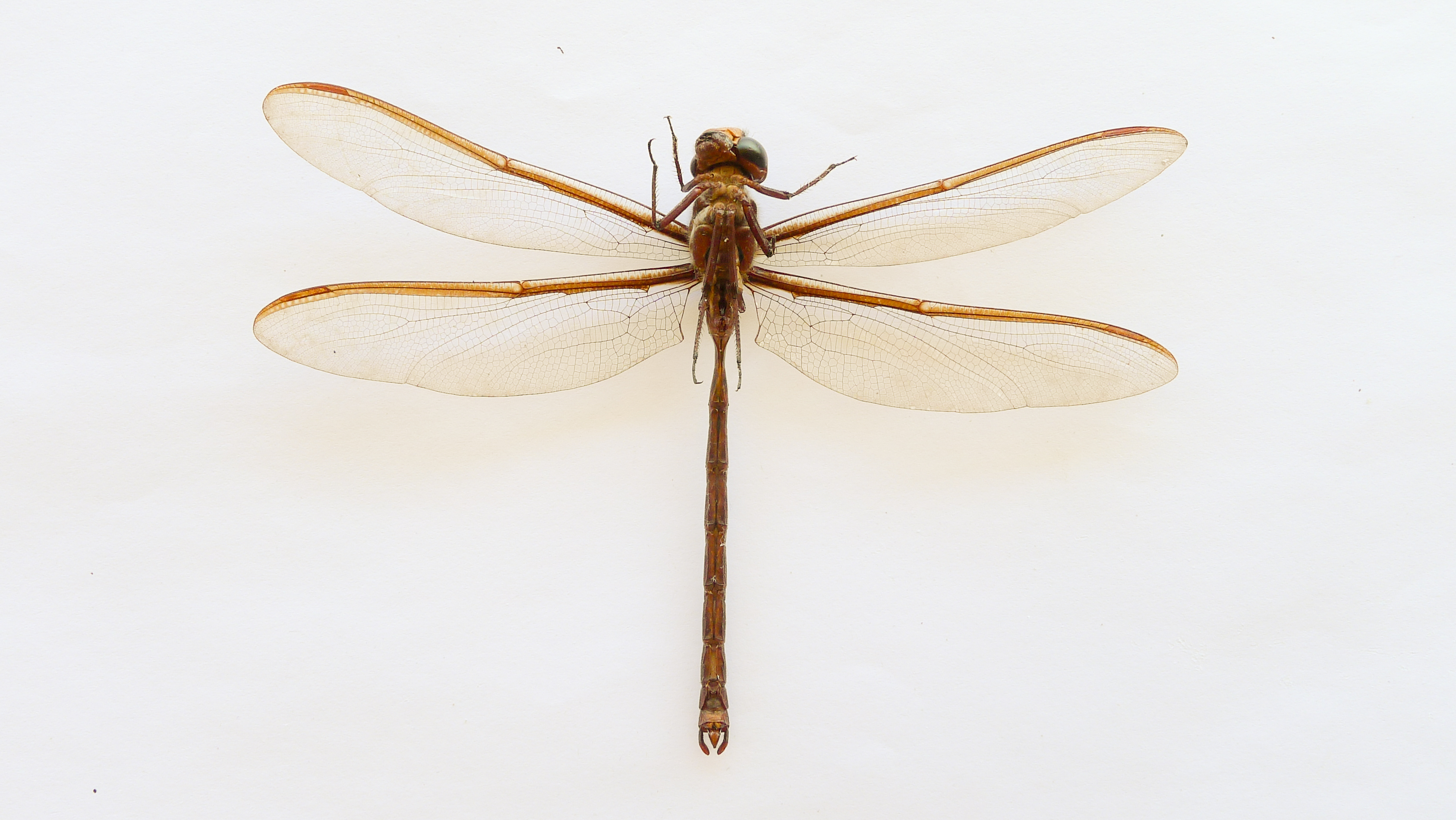
Male from below

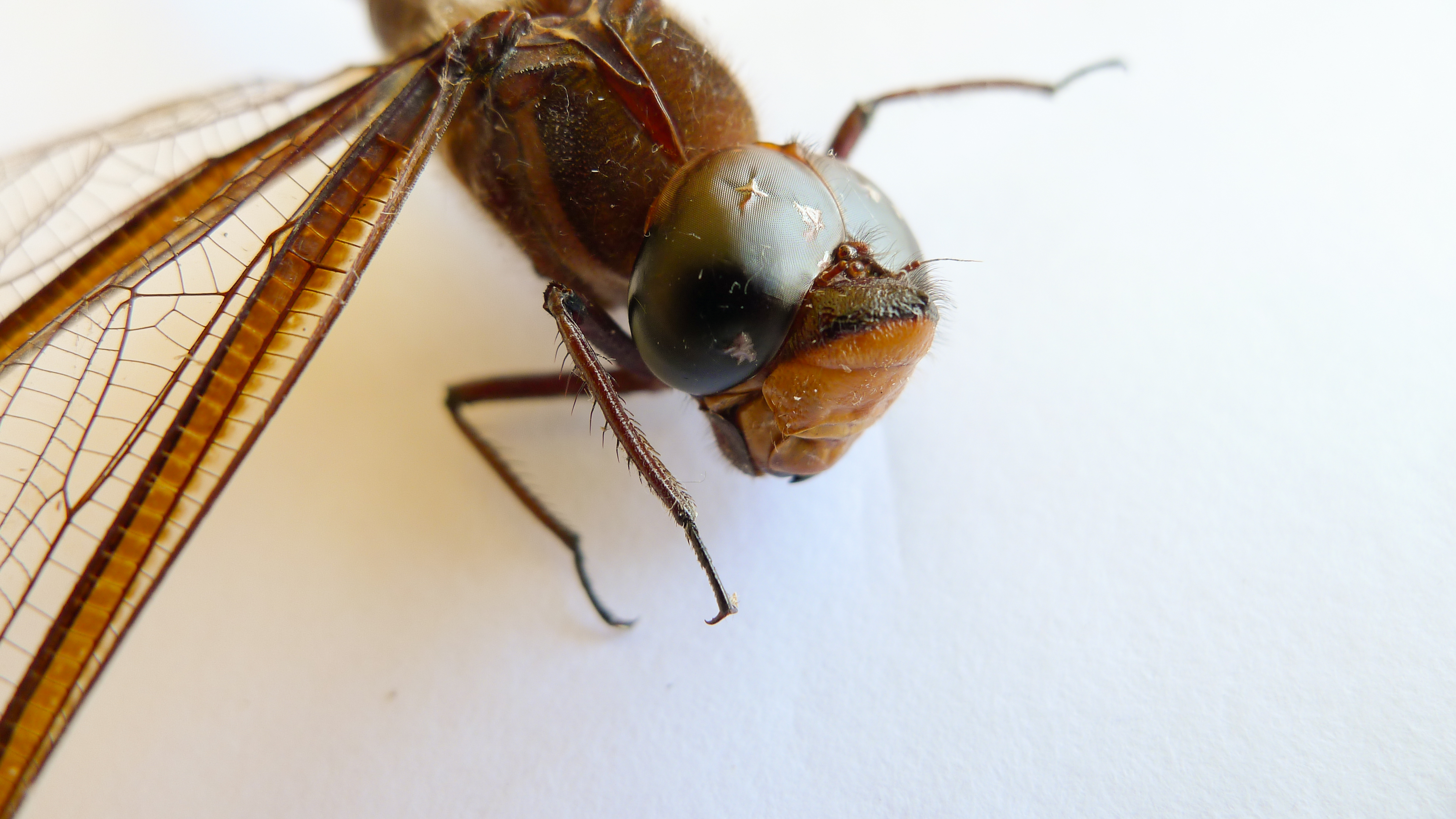
Male head

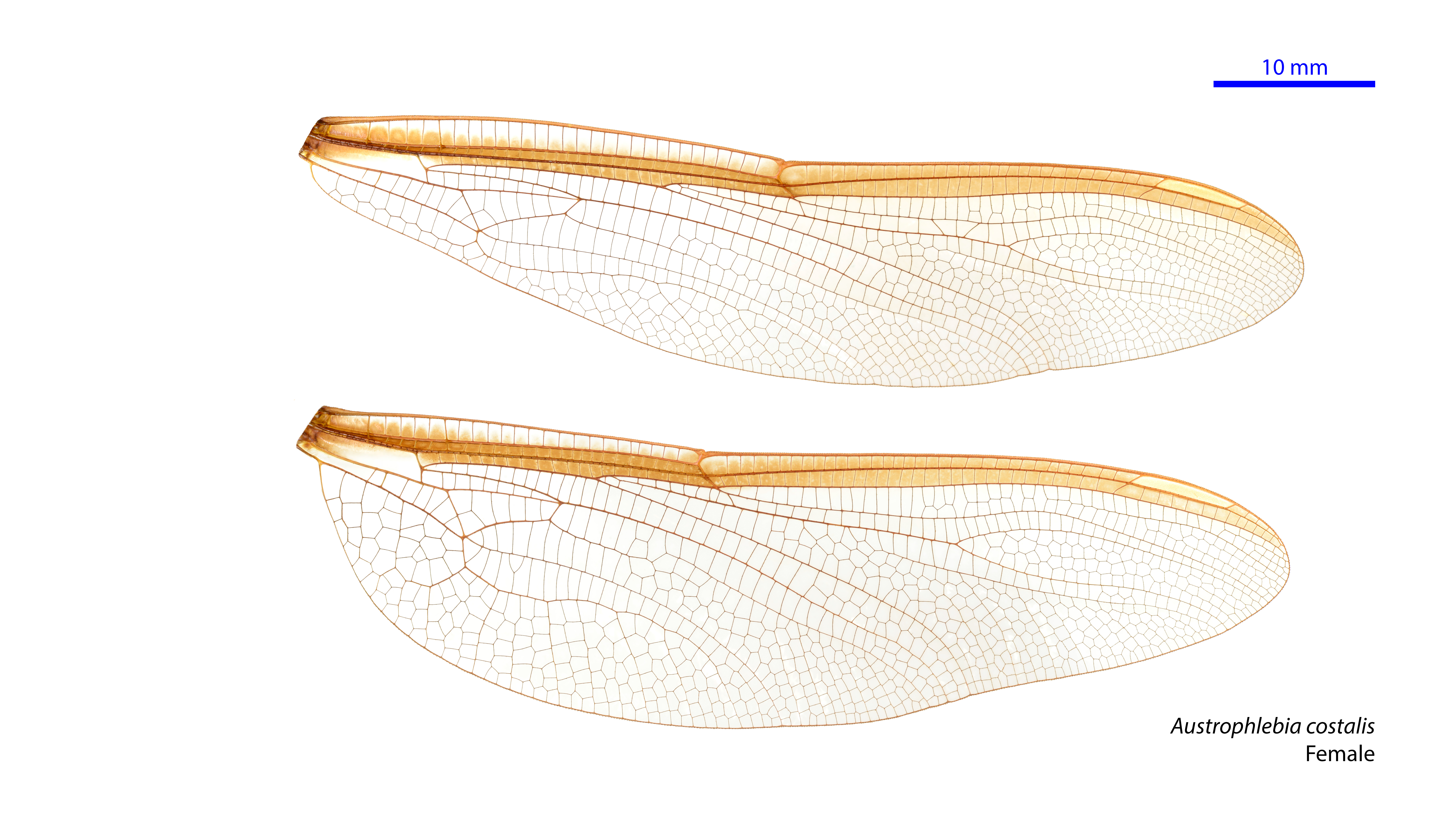
Female wings

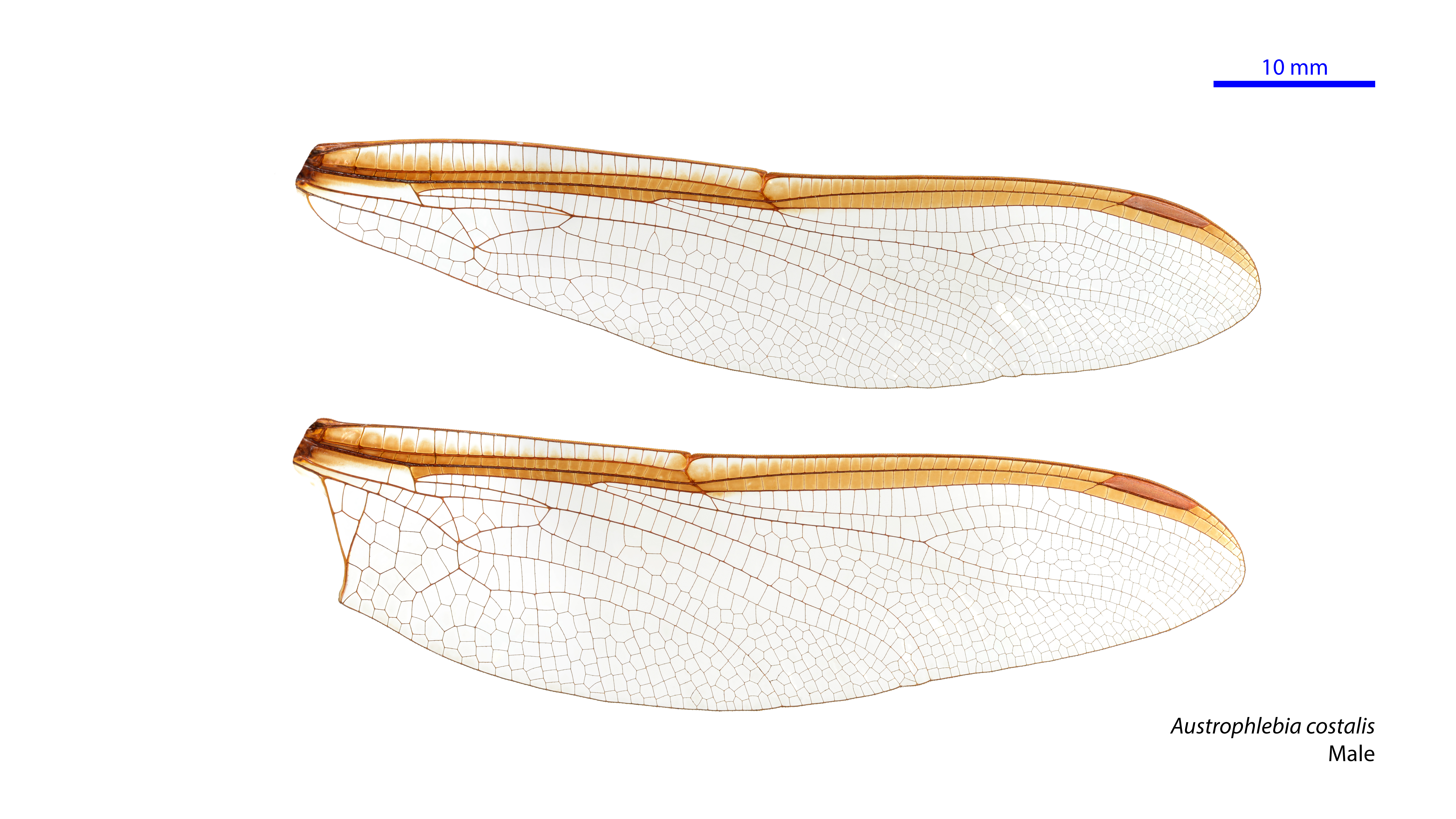
Male wings

== See also ==
- List of Odonata species of Australia
