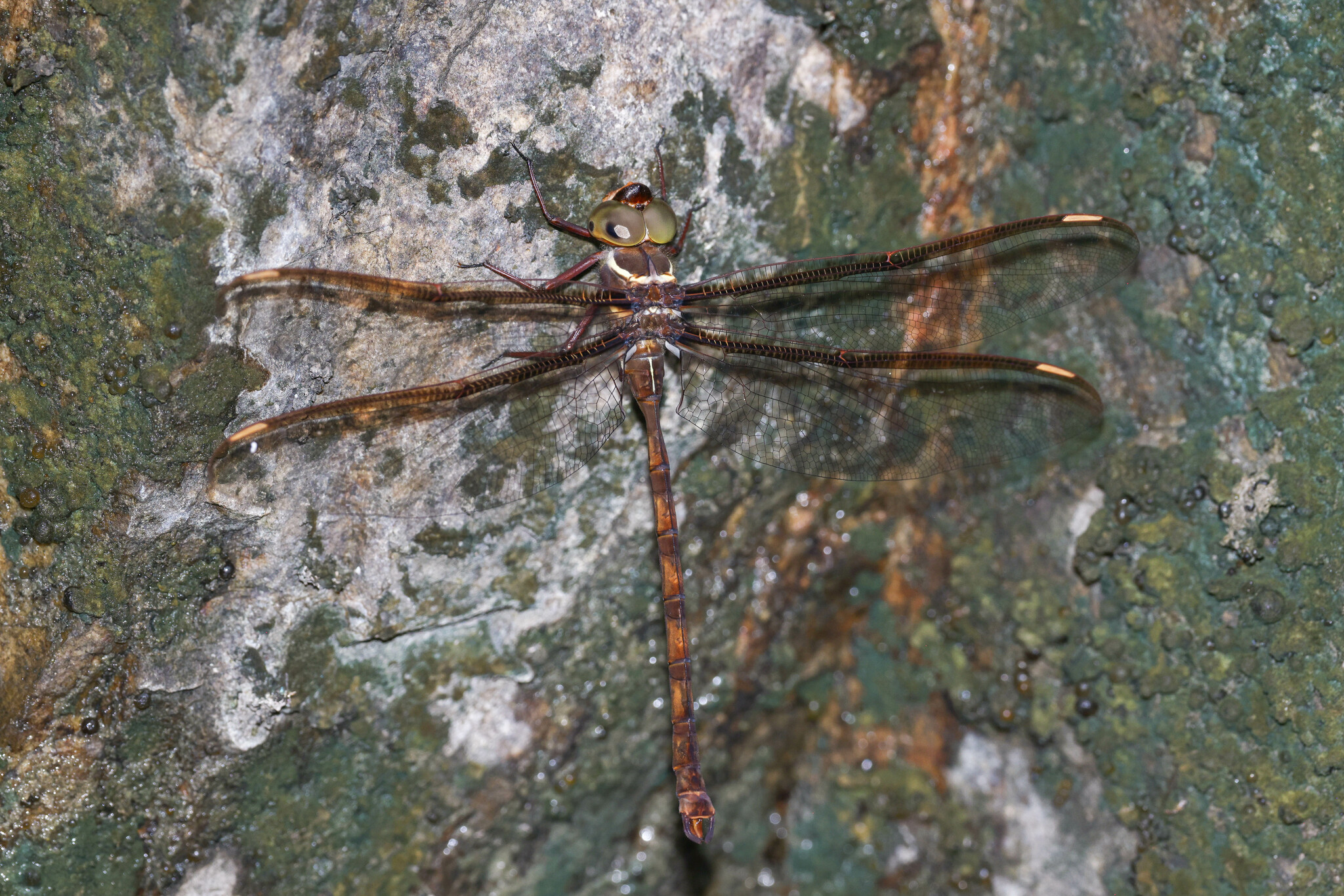

Conservation status
- Near Threatened (IUCN 3.1)

Scientific classification
- Kingdom: Animalia
- Phylum: Arthropoda
- Clade: Pancrustacea
- Class: Insecta
- Order: Odonata
- Suborder: Anisoptera
- Family: Aeshnidae
- Genus: Austrophlebia
- Species: A. subcostalis

Binomial name
- Austrophlebia subcostalis Theischinger, 1996

= Austrophlebia subcostalis =

Northern giant darner

Species of dragonfly

Austrophlebia subcostalis, commonly known as the northern giant darner, is a species of dragonfly in the family Aeshnidae. It is an enormous dragonfly with brown and yellow markings. It is found in rainforest streams in north-eastern Australia

== Etymology ==
The genus name Austrophlebia combines austro- (Latin auster, “southern”) with -phlebia, from Greek φλέψ (phleps, “vein”), reflecting its relationship to Telephlebia and Austroaeschna.

The species name subcostalis is derived from the Latin preposition sub ("under") and costalis ("pertaining to the rib"), referring to the reduced extent of russet-brown colouring below the costa, the leading longitudinal vein of the wing, and its close similarity to Austrophlebia costalis.

== Gallery ==
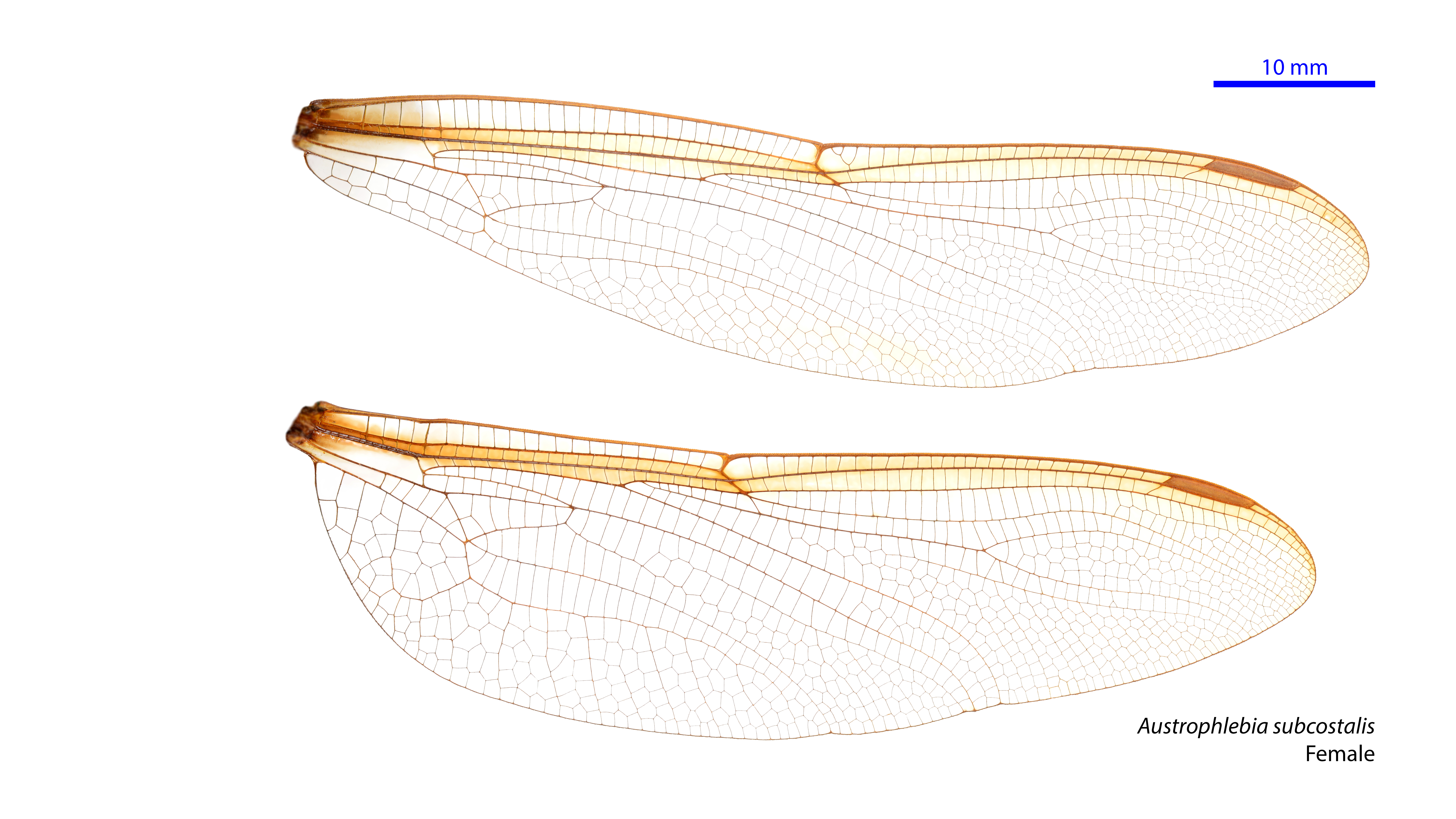
Female wings

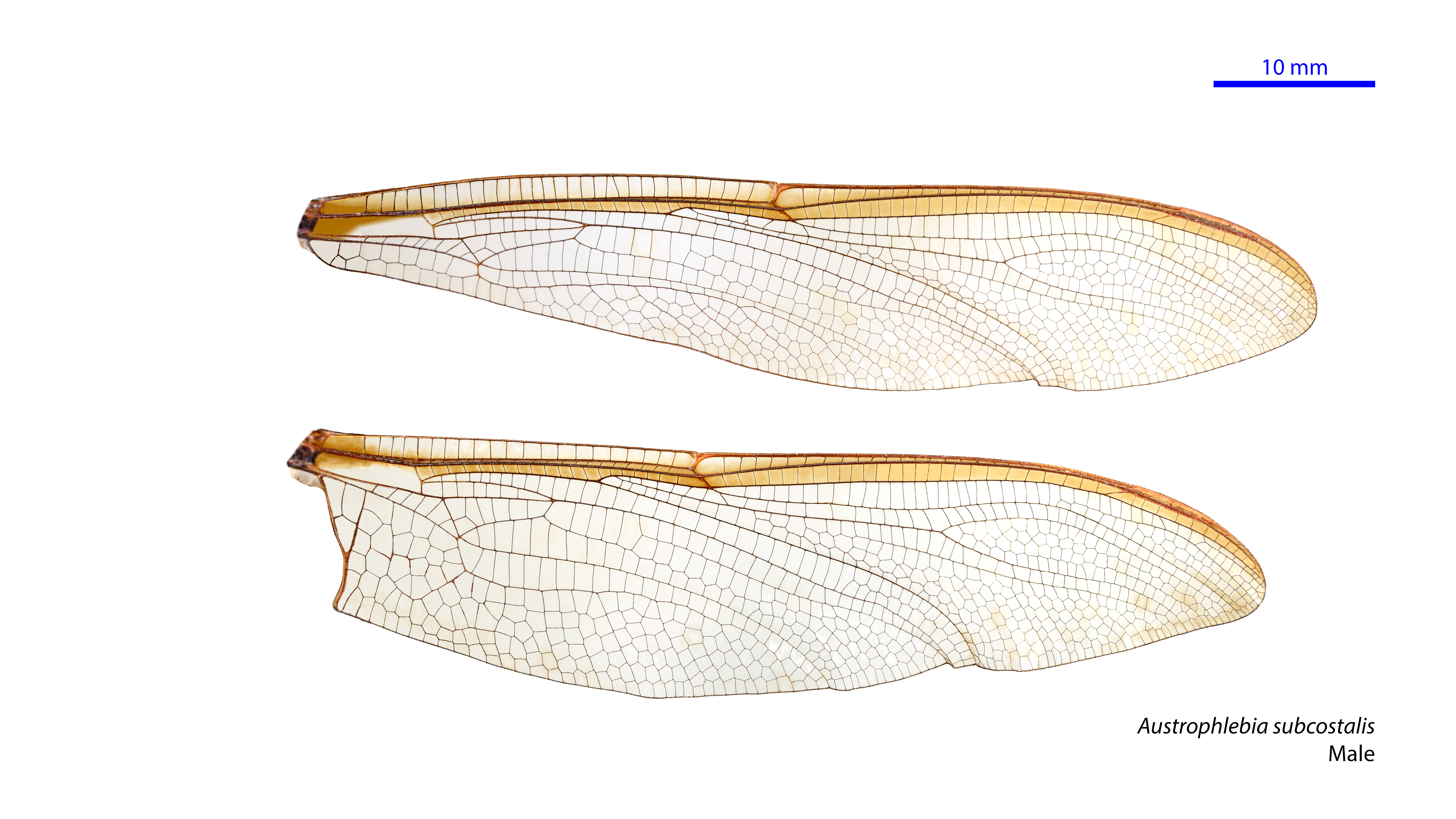
Male wings

== See also ==
- List of Odonata species of Australia
