= Telephlebia undia =

Carnarvon evening darner

Conservation status
- Data Deficient (IUCN 3.1)

Scientific classification
- Kingdom: Animalia
- Phylum: Arthropoda
- Clade: Pancrustacea
- Class: Insecta
- Order: Odonata
- Suborder: Anisoptera
- Family: Aeshnidae
- Genus: Telephlebia
- Species: T. undia

Binomial name
- Telephlebia undia Theischinger, 1985

Species of dragonfly

Telephlebia undia is a species of dragonfly in the family Aeshnidae, known as the Carnarvon evening darner. It is a medium to large, dark chestnut brown dragonfly with dark markings on the leading edge and base of its wings. It is endemic to the vicinity of Carnarvon National Park in Central Queensland, Australia, where it inhabits streams near waterfalls, and flies at dusk.

Telephlebia undia appears similar to Telephlebia tryoni.

== Etymology ==
The genus name Telephlebia is derived from the Greek τῆλε (tēle, "at a distance") and φλέψ (phleps, "vein"), referring to the unusually elongated vein near the leading edge of the wing.

The species name undia is an Aboriginal word for gorge, alluding to Carnarvon Gorge, where the species was first recorded.

== Gallery ==
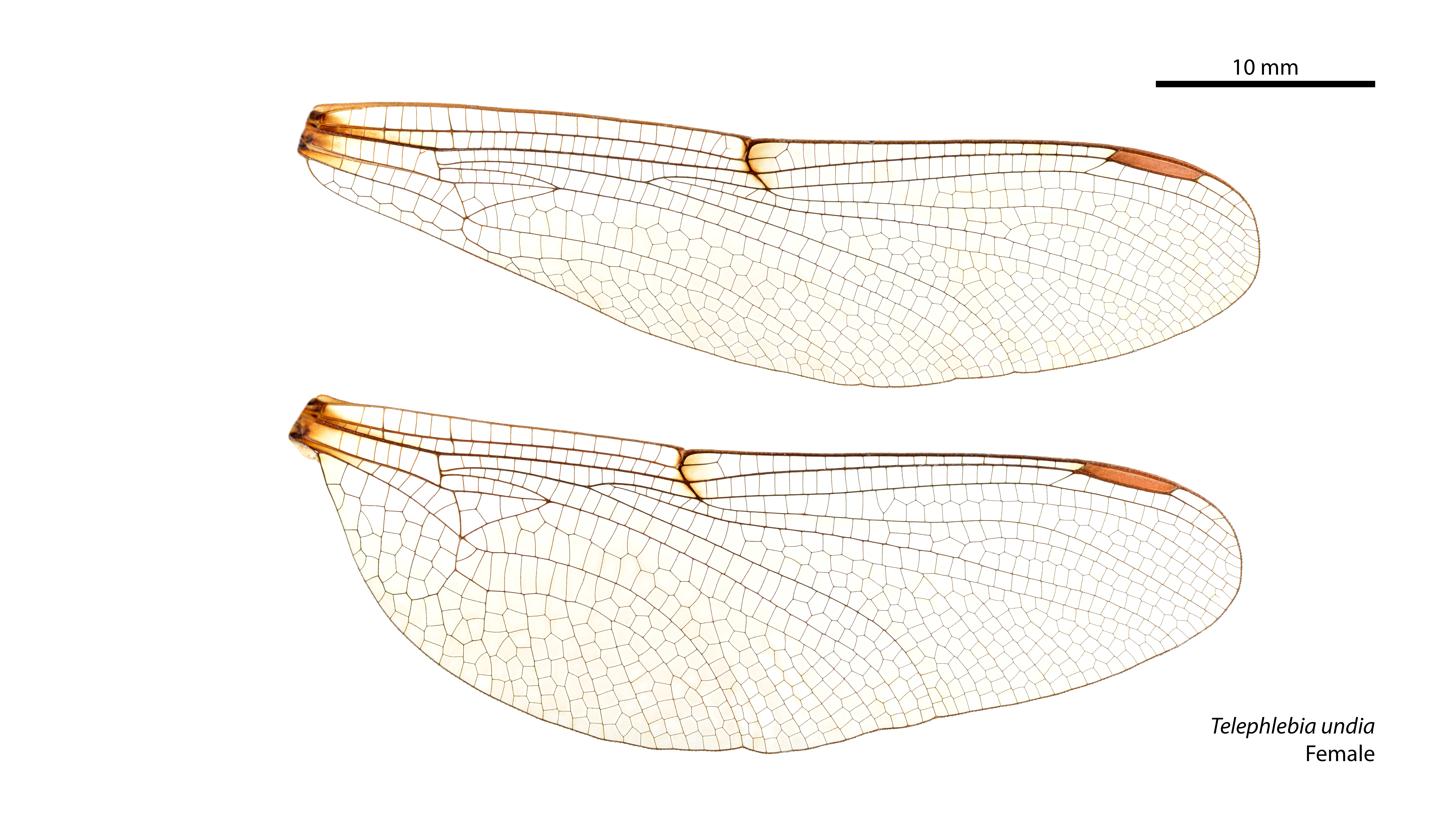
Female wings

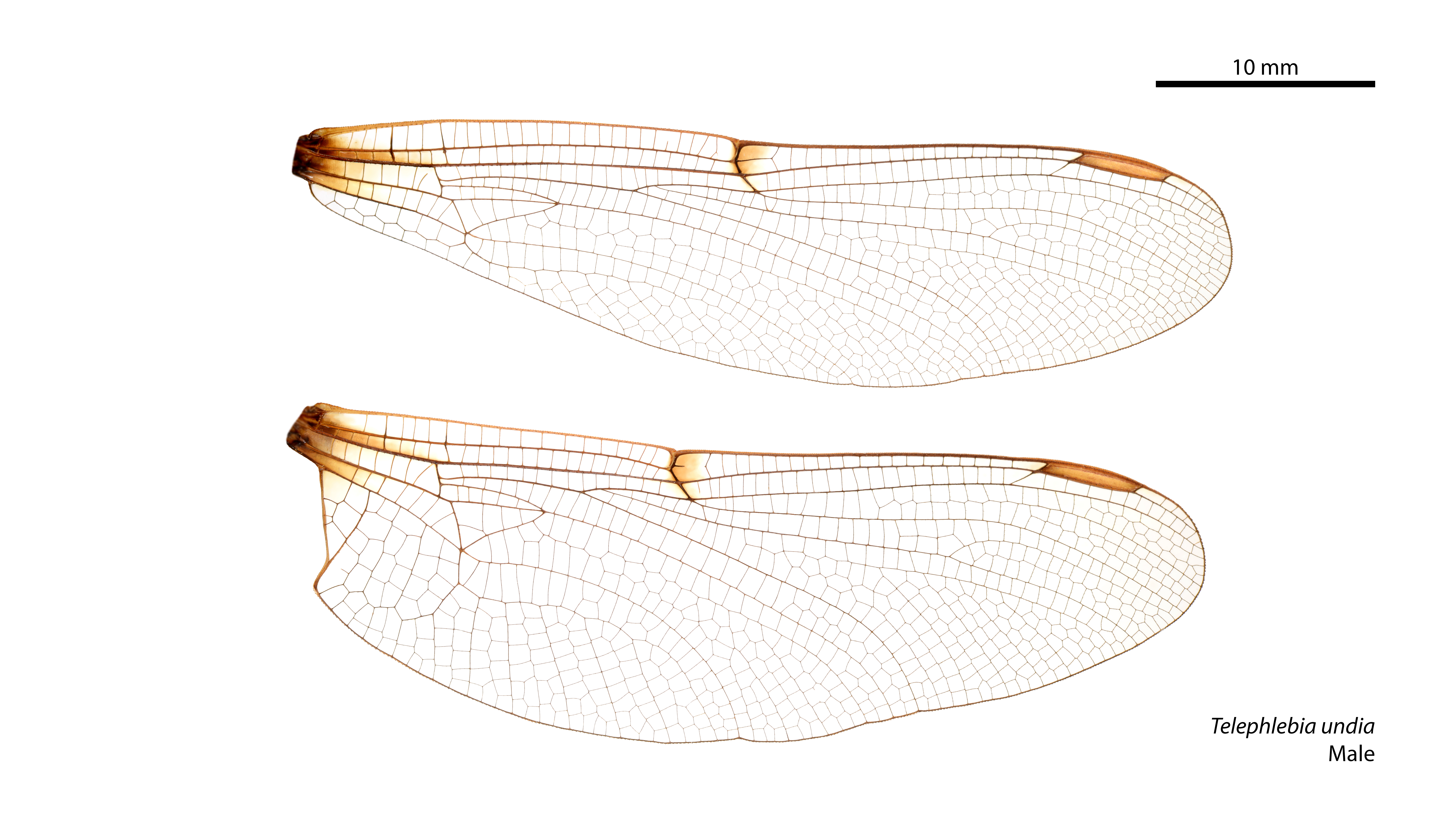
Male wings

== See also ==
- List of Odonata species of Australia
