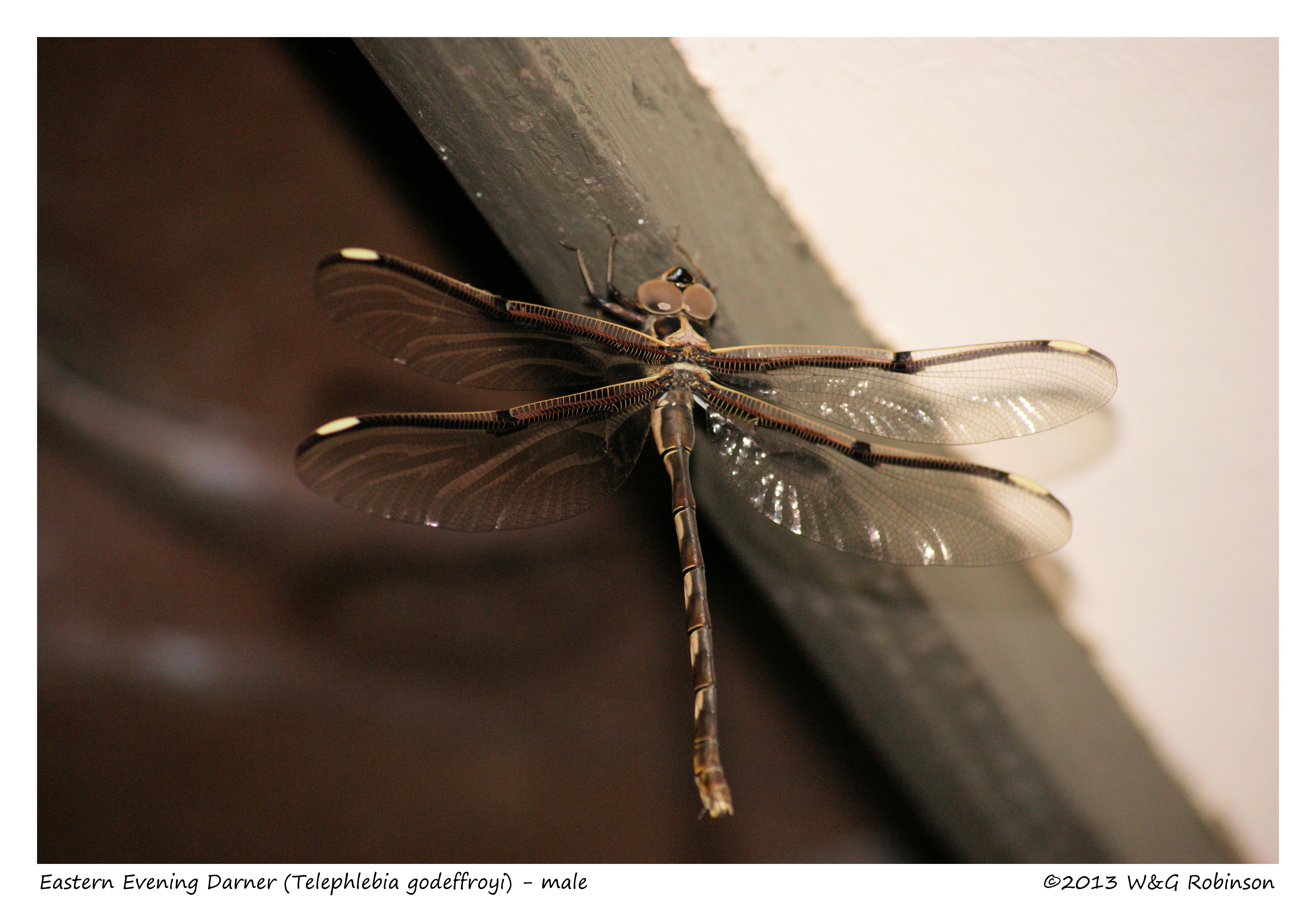
- Female

Conservation status
- Least Concern (IUCN 3.1)

Scientific classification
- Kingdom: Animalia
- Phylum: Arthropoda
- Clade: Pancrustacea
- Class: Insecta
- Order: Odonata
- Suborder: Anisoptera
- Family: Aeshnidae
- Genus: Telephlebia
- Species: T. godeffroyi

Binomial name
- Telephlebia godeffroyi Selys, 1883

= Telephlebia godeffroyi =

Eastern evening darner

Species of dragonfly

Telephlebia godeffroyi is a species of dragonfly in the family Aeshnidae, known as the eastern evening darner. It is a medium to large, dark chestnut brown dragonfly with dark markings on the leading edge of its wings. It is endemic to eastern New South Wales, Australia, where it inhabits stream margins and waterfalls, and flies at dusk.

== Etymology ==
The genus name Telephlebia is derived from the Greek τῆλε (tēle, "at a distance") and φλέψ (phleps, "vein"), referring to the unusually elongated vein near the leading edge of the wing.

In 1883, Edmond de Sélys Longchamps named this species godeffroyi, an eponym honouring Johann Cesar VI Godeffroy (1813-1885), the Hamburg shipping magnate whose captains and collectors assembled the original southern hemisphere collections of the Museum Godeffroy.

== Gallery ==
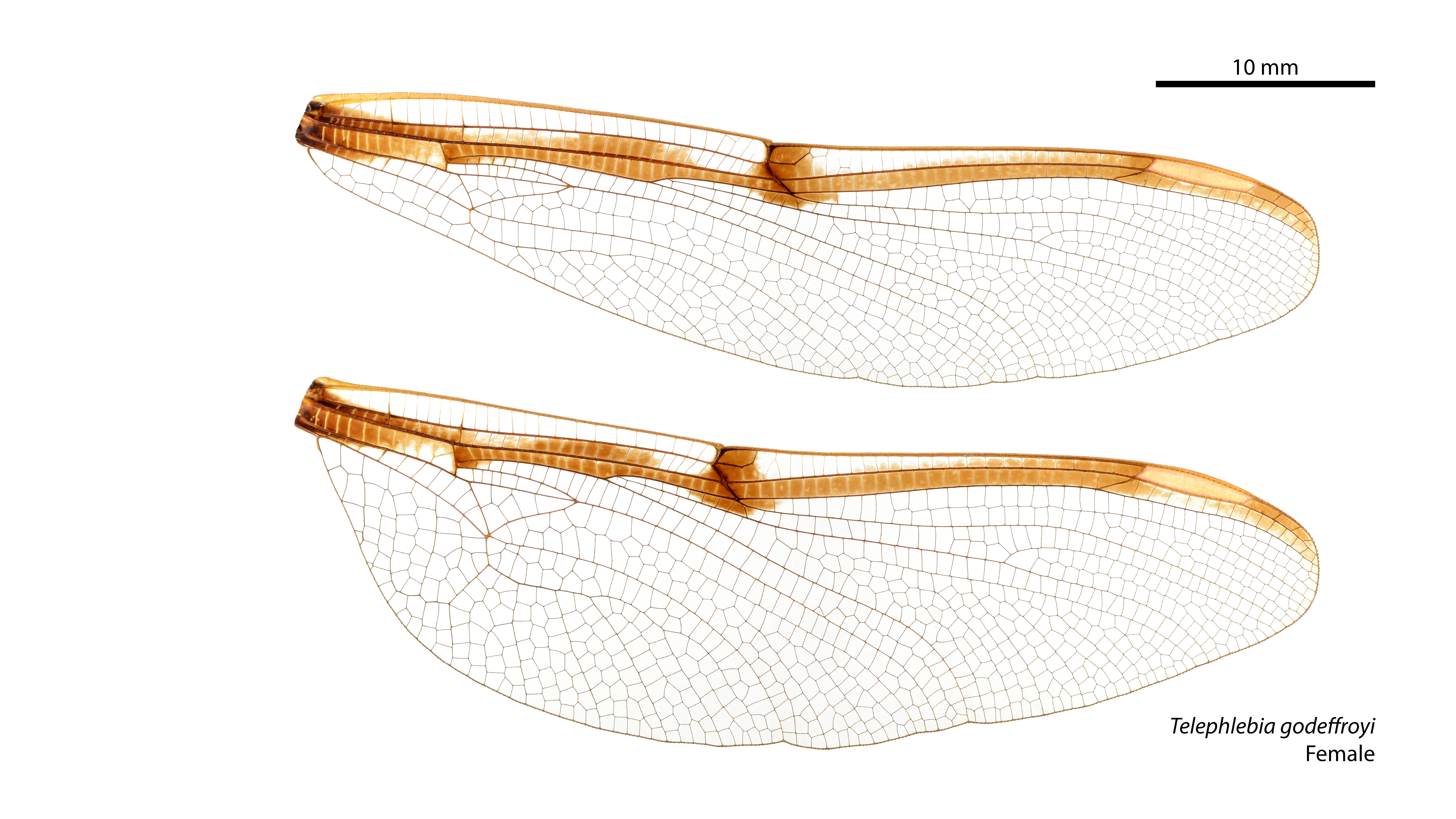
Female wings

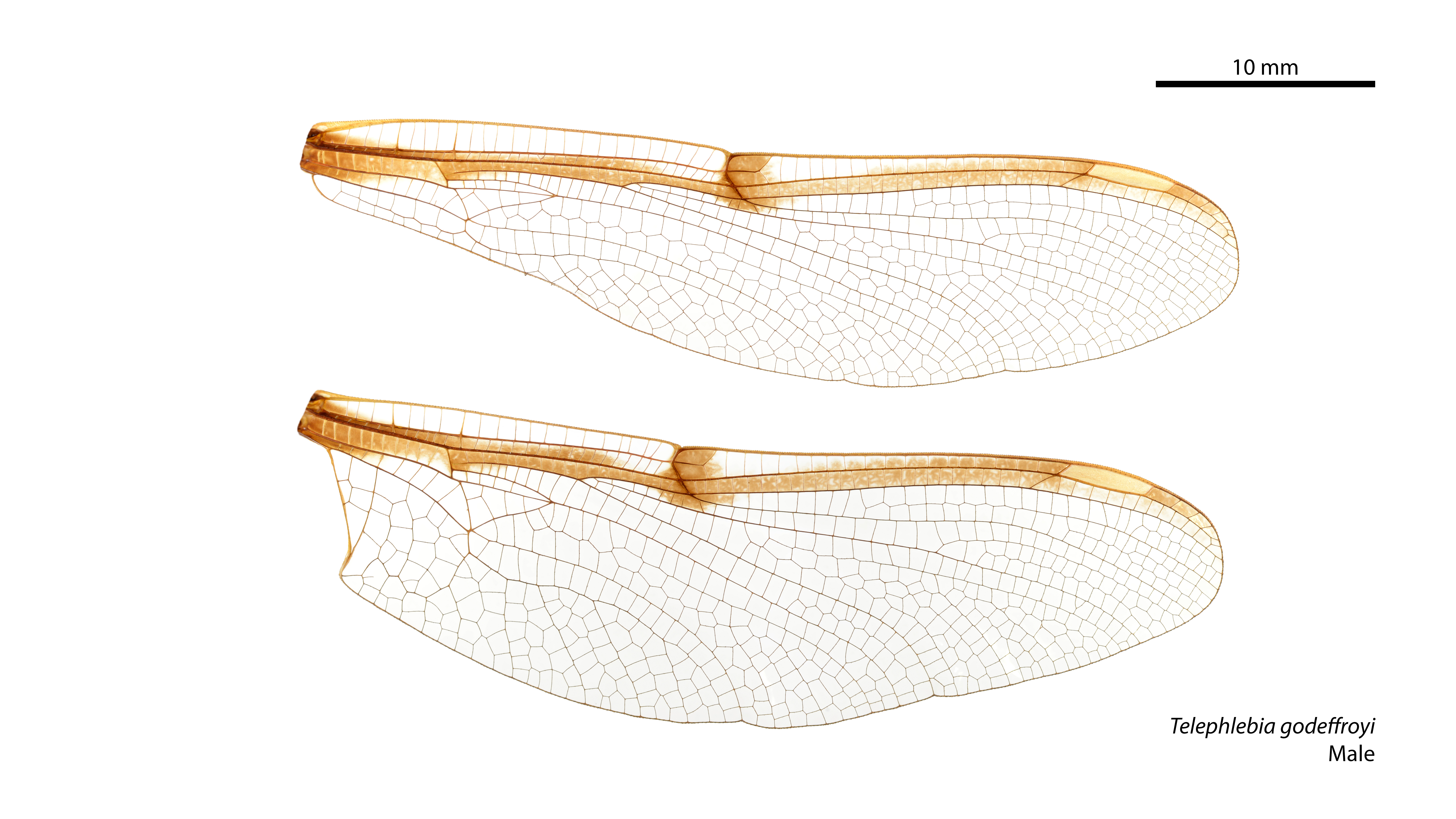
Male wings

== See also ==
- List of Odonata species of Australia
