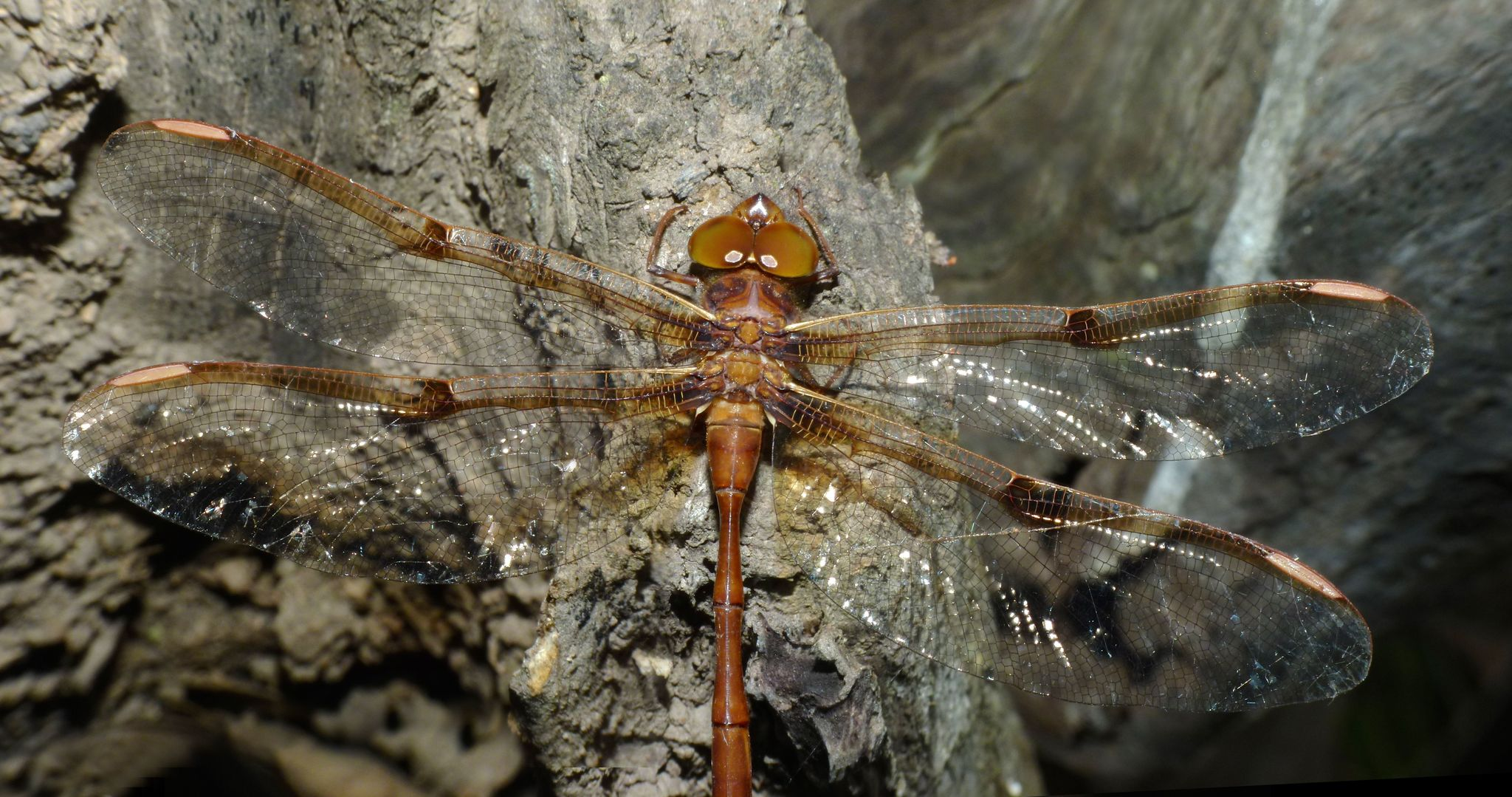
- Female

Conservation status
- Near Threatened (IUCN 3.1)

Scientific classification
- Kingdom: Animalia
- Phylum: Arthropoda
- Clade: Pancrustacea
- Class: Insecta
- Order: Odonata
- Suborder: Anisoptera
- Family: Aeshnidae
- Genus: Telephlebia
- Species: T. tryoni

Binomial name
- Telephlebia tryoni Tillyard, 1917

= Telephlebia tryoni =

Coastal evening darner

Species of dragonfly

Telephlebia tryoni is a species of dragonfly in the family Aeshnidae, known as the coastal evening darner. It is a medium to large, dark chestnut brown dragonfly with dark markings on the leading edge and base of its wings. It is endemic to eastern Australia, where it has been found along streams in rainforests and open areas, and flies at dusk.

== Etymology ==
The genus name Telephlebia is derived from the Greek τῆλε (tēle, "at a distance") and φλέψ (phleps, "vein"), referring to the unusually elongated vein near the leading edge of the wing.

In 1917, Tillyard named this species tryoni, an eponym honouring Henry Tryon (1856-1943), Government Entomologist of Queensland.

== Gallery ==
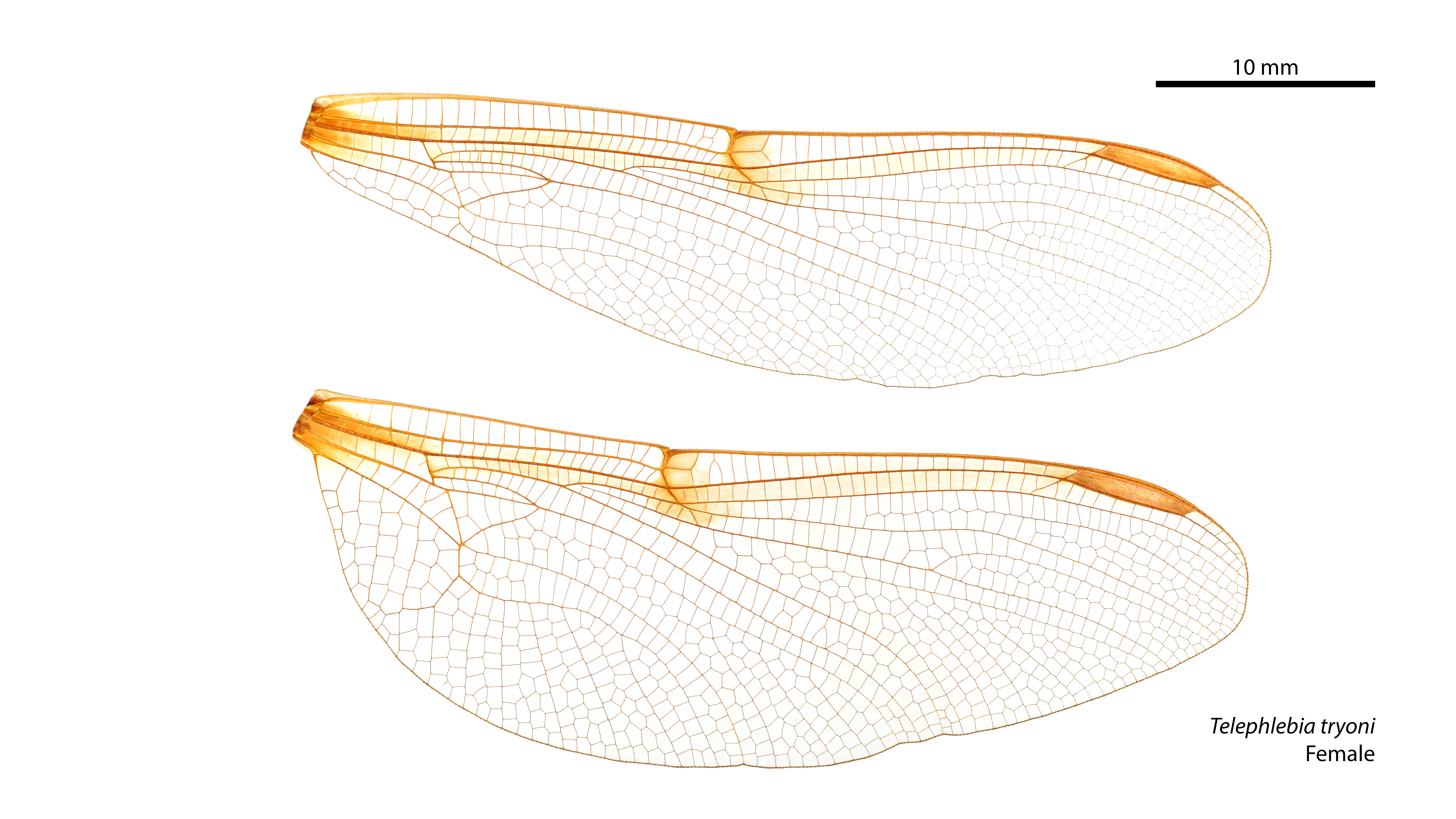
Female wings

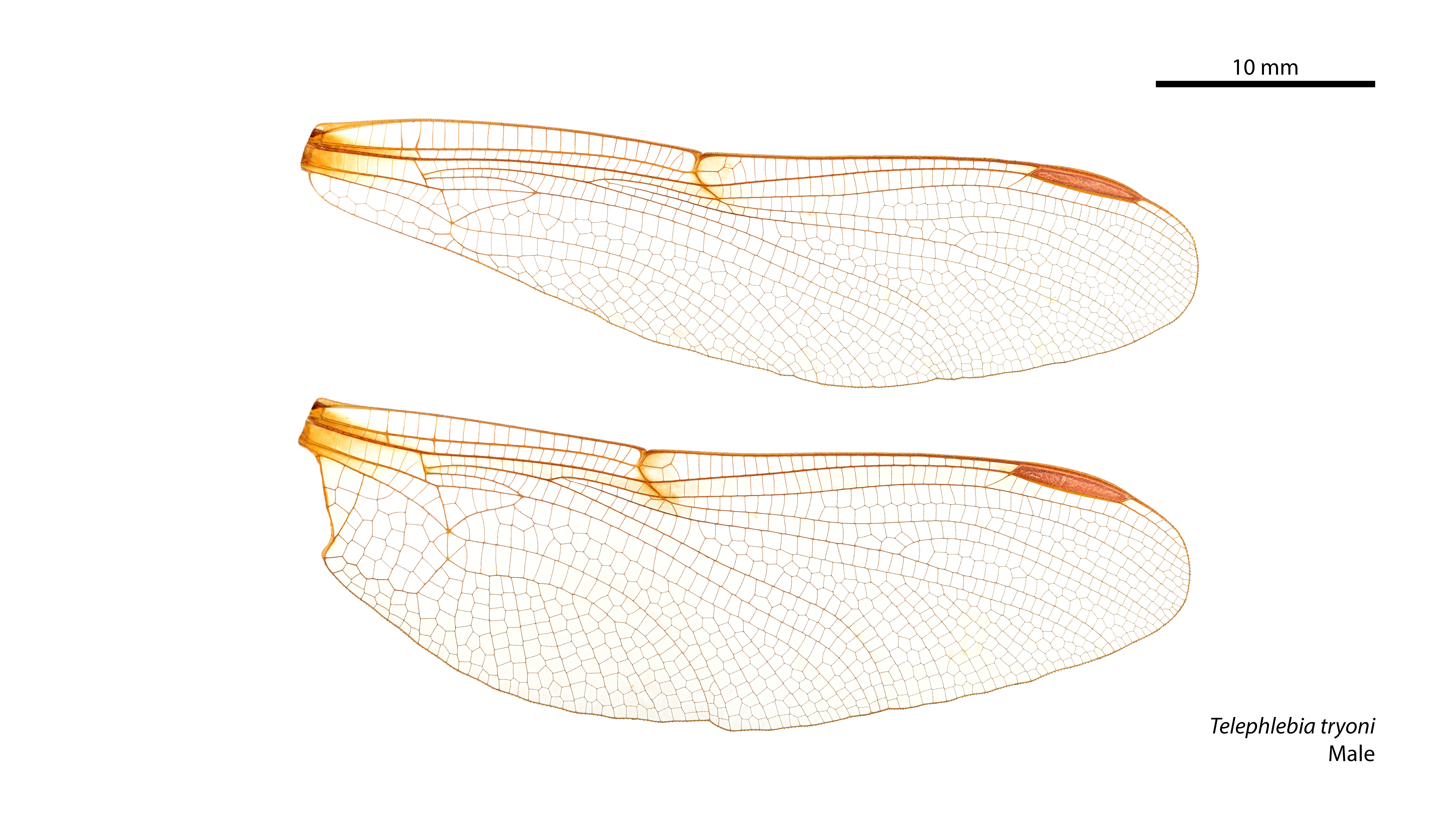
Male wings

== See also ==
- List of Odonata species of Australia
