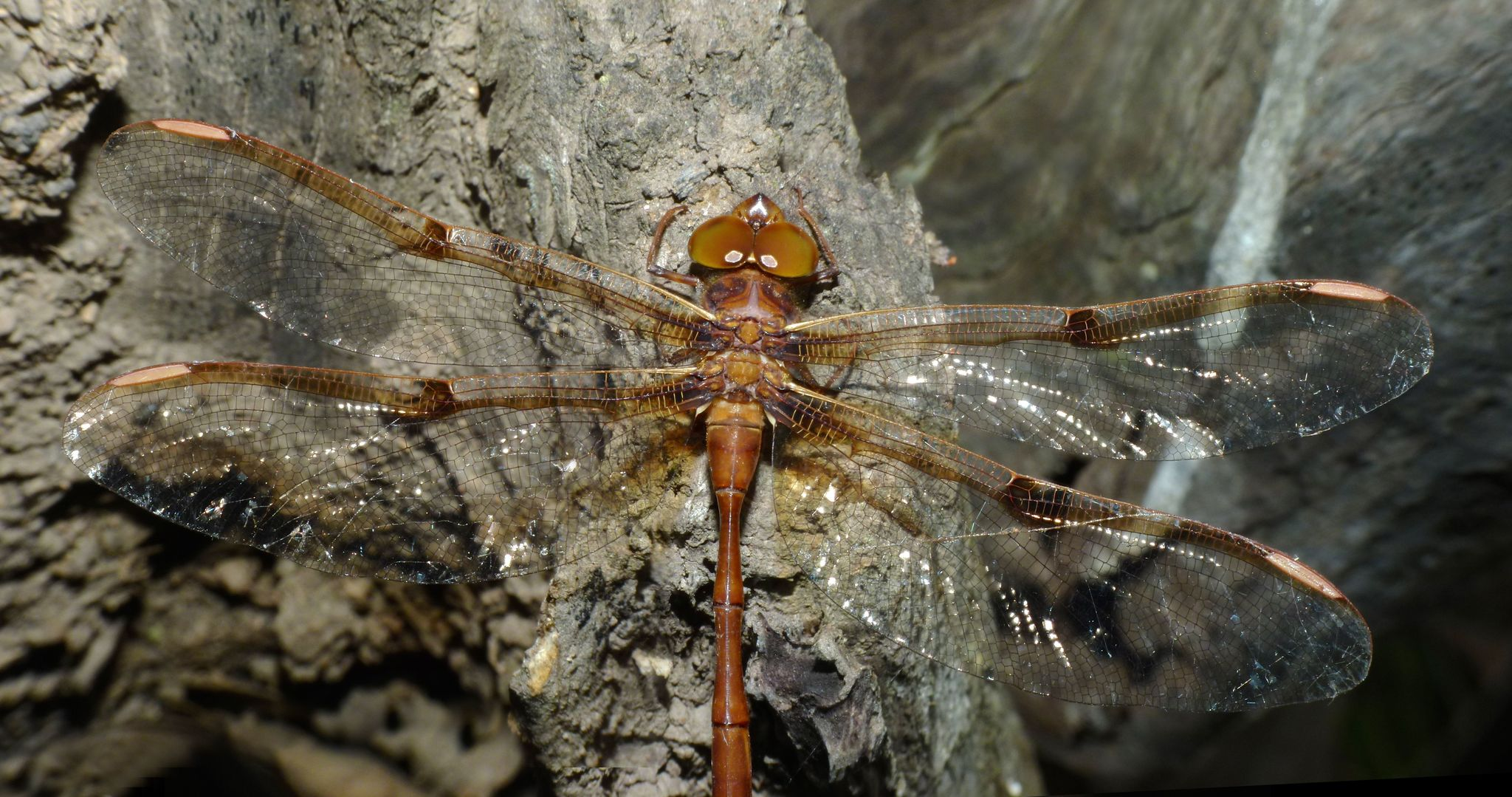
- Telephlebia tryoni

Scientific classification
- Kingdom: Animalia
- Phylum: Arthropoda
- Clade: Pancrustacea
- Class: Insecta
- Order: Odonata
- Suborder: Anisoptera
- Family: Aeshnidae
- Genus: Telephlebia; Selys, 1883

= Telephlebia =

Genus of dragonflies

Telephlebia is a genus of dragonflies in the family Aeshnidae, endemic to eastern Australia. Species of Telephlebia are medium to large, dark chestnut brown dragonflies with dark markings on the leading edge of their wings. They are crepuscular and fly at dusk.

== Species ==
The genus Telephlebia includes the following species:

- Telephlebia brevicauda Tillyard, 1916 – southern evening darner
- Telephlebia cyclops Tillyard, 1916 – northern evening darner
- Telephlebia godeffroyi Selys, 1883 – eastern evening darner
- Telephlebia tillyardi Campion, 1916 – tropical evening darner
- Telephlebia tryoni Tillyard, 1917 – coastal evening darner
- Telephlebia undia Theischinger, 1985 – Carnarvon evening darner

== Etymology ==
The genus name Telephlebia is derived from the Greek τῆλε (tēle, "at a distance") and φλέψ (phleps, "vein"), referring to the unusually elongated vein near the leading edge of the wing.

== See also ==
- List of Odonata species of Australia
