= C. balansae =

C. balansae may refer to:

- Celtis balansae, a plant species endemic to New Caledonia
- Colchicum balansae, a flowering plant species native to Turkey and the Greek island of Rhodes
- Cycas balansae, a plant species native to China and Vietnam

== See also ==
- Balansae
