= Colchicum zahnii =

Conservation status
- Least Concern (IUCN 3.1)

Scientific classification
- Kingdom: Plantae
- Clade: Tracheophytes
- Clade: Angiosperms
- Clade: Monocots
- Order: Liliales
- Family: Colchicaceae
- Genus: Colchicum
- Species: C. zahnii

Binomial name
- Colchicum zahnii Heldr.

Synonyms
- Colchicum psaridis Heldr. ex Halácsy

Species of flowering plant

Colchicum zahnii is a species of flowering plant in the family Colchicaceae. It is native to southern Greece. It blooms in mid-autumn from rhizomatous corms. The flowers can be variable coloured, being a pale purple-pink to white and are often held wide open. The leaves are produced at flowering time and usually number 2 to 3. This species is similar to Colchicum boissieri in that the corms grow into large patches, rather than tight clumps like Colchicum speciosum or Colchicum autumnale.
