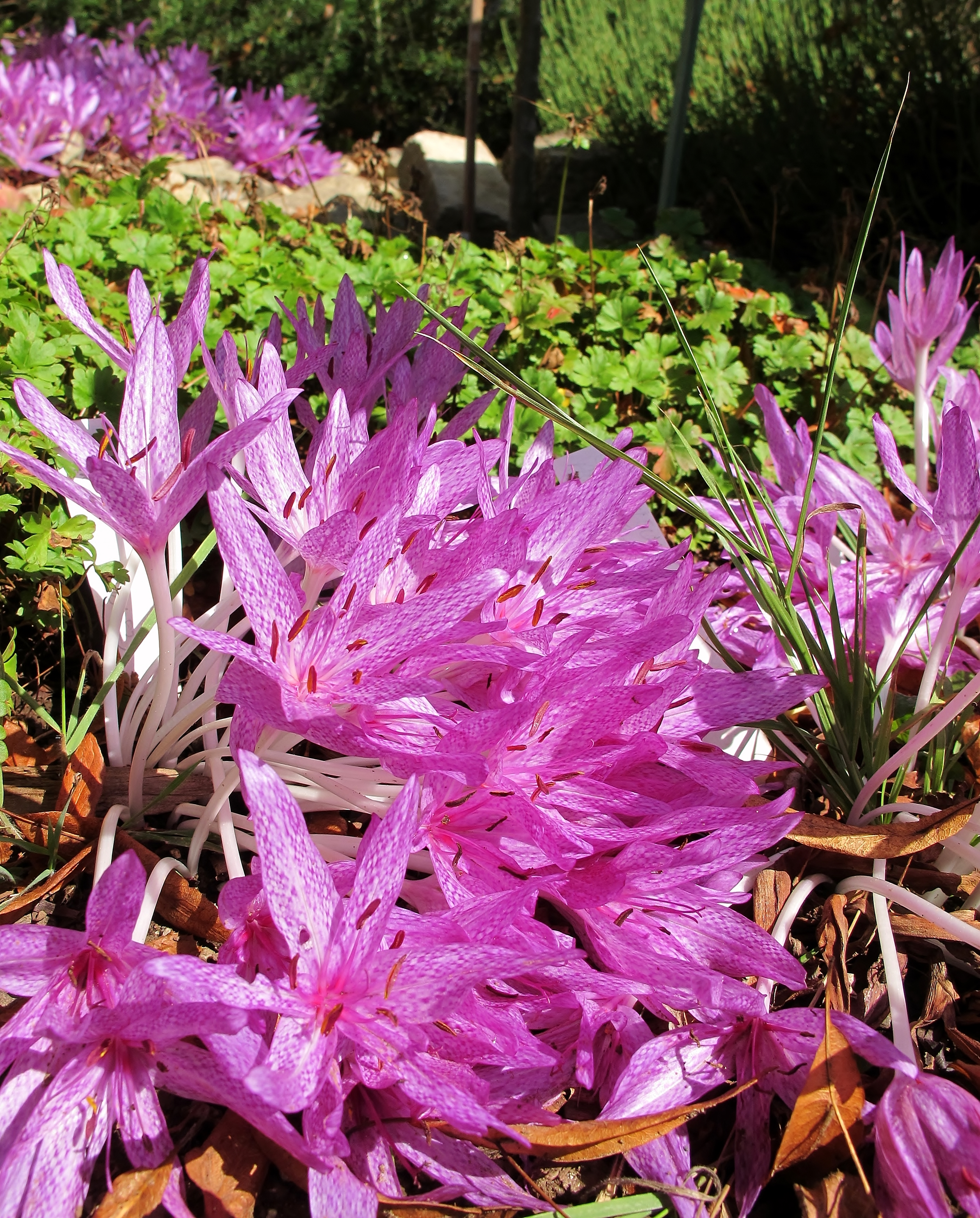

Scientific classification
- Kingdom: Plantae
- Clade: Tracheophytes
- Clade: Angiosperms
- Clade: Monocots
- Order: Liliales
- Family: Colchicaceae
- Genus: Colchicum
- Species: C. × agrippinum

Binomial name
- Colchicum × agrippinum Baker

= Colchicum × agrippinum =

Species of flowering plant

Colchicum × agrippinum is a species of flowering plant in the family Colchicaceae. It is considered to be a hybrid between C. variegatum and C. autumnale, and not a true species, although this is not certain. The genus and the species are commonly called autumn crocus, naked lady or meadow saffron.

Colchicum × agrippinum is considered one of the easiest species of the genus Colchicum to grow. It is moderately tall, up to 6 inches (15 cm) and displays many crocus-like flowers from a single corm. Like other colchicums, it flowers in late summer or autumn long before the strap-shaped leaves, which appear in spring. The flowers have a distinct tessellation, or checker-board pattern of pink and white, and the anthers have purple tips. These traits help to identify it from other colchicums.

This plant has gained the Royal Horticultural Society's Award of Garden Merit (confirmed 2017).
