= C. boissieri =

C. boissieri may refer to:

- Colchicum boissieri
- Cordia boissieri
