= Colchicum parlatoris =

Scientific classification
- Kingdom: Plantae
- Clade: Tracheophytes
- Clade: Angiosperms
- Clade: Monocots
- Order: Liliales
- Family: Colchicaceae
- Genus: Colchicum
- Species: C. parlatoris

Binomial name
- Colchicum parlatoris Orph.

Species of flowering plant

Colchicum parlatoris is a small species of flowering plant native to Greece. It has dark-purple pink flowers on short stems bearing prominent yellow stamens. The species is very similar to Colchicum pusillum.
