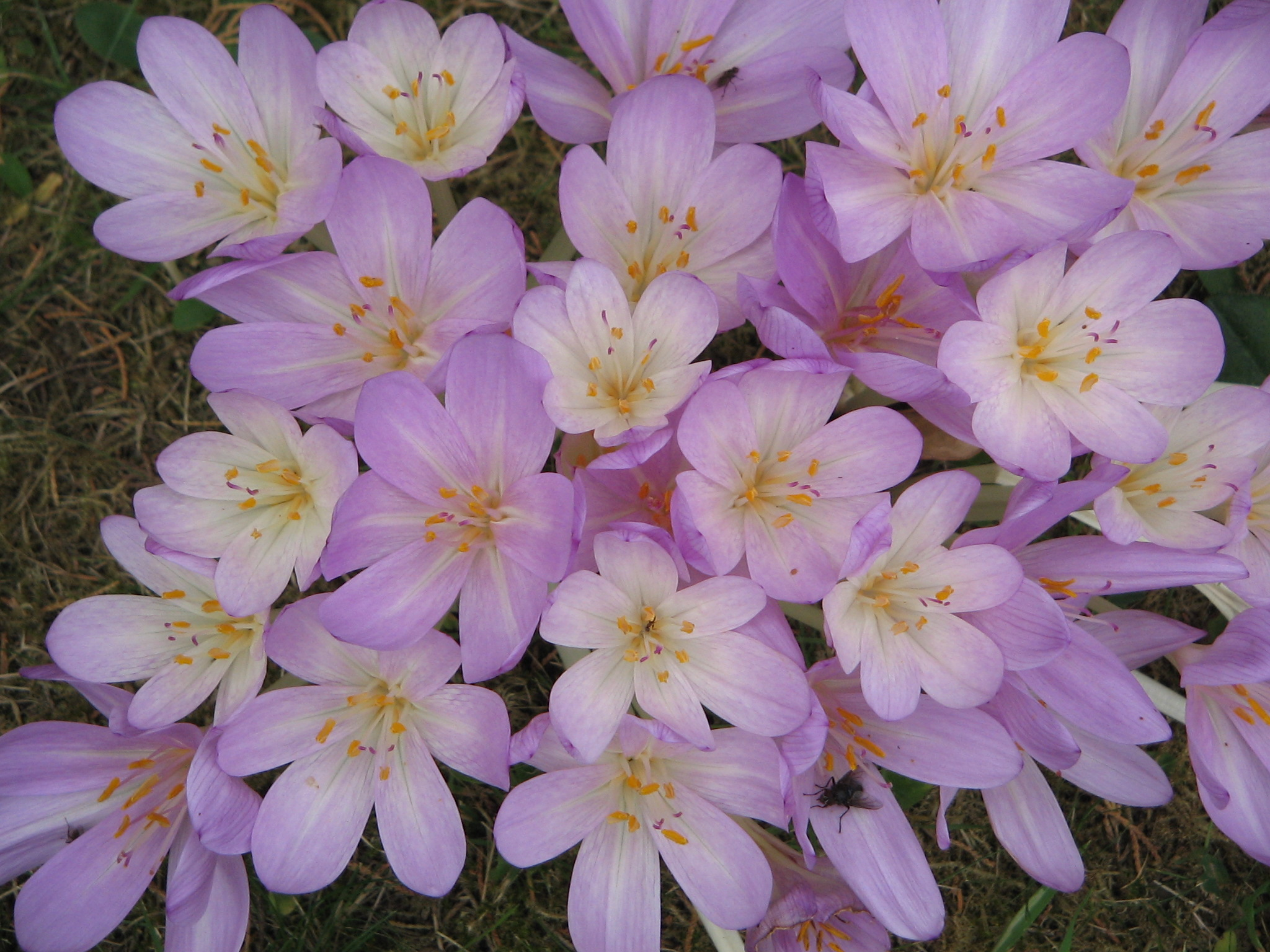

Scientific classification
- Kingdom: Plantae
- Clade: Tracheophytes
- Clade: Angiosperms
- Clade: Monocots
- Order: Liliales
- Family: Colchicaceae
- Genus: Colchicum
- Species: C. × byzantinum

Binomial name
- Colchicum × byzantinum Ker Gawl.

= Colchicum × byzantinum =

Species of flowering plant

Colchicum × byzantinum, the Byzantine meadow saffron, is a species of flowering plant in the family Colchicaceae with a long history of cultivation, and no certain place of origin. It is thought to be a hybrid of other species.

It shares many traits with Colchicum cilicicum. The flowers, which appear in autumn, have no scent and are light pink with a prominent central white stripe. Each tepal has a purple tip, even white selections. This plant is very reliable in gardens, and has gained the Royal Horticultural Society's Award of Garden Merit (confirmed 2017).

Colchicums resemble crocuses. However, they belong to a different family, and unlike crocuses are toxic if eaten.

The specific epithet byzantinum means "from Byzantium" (now Istanbul).

== See also ==
- Colchicum laetum
