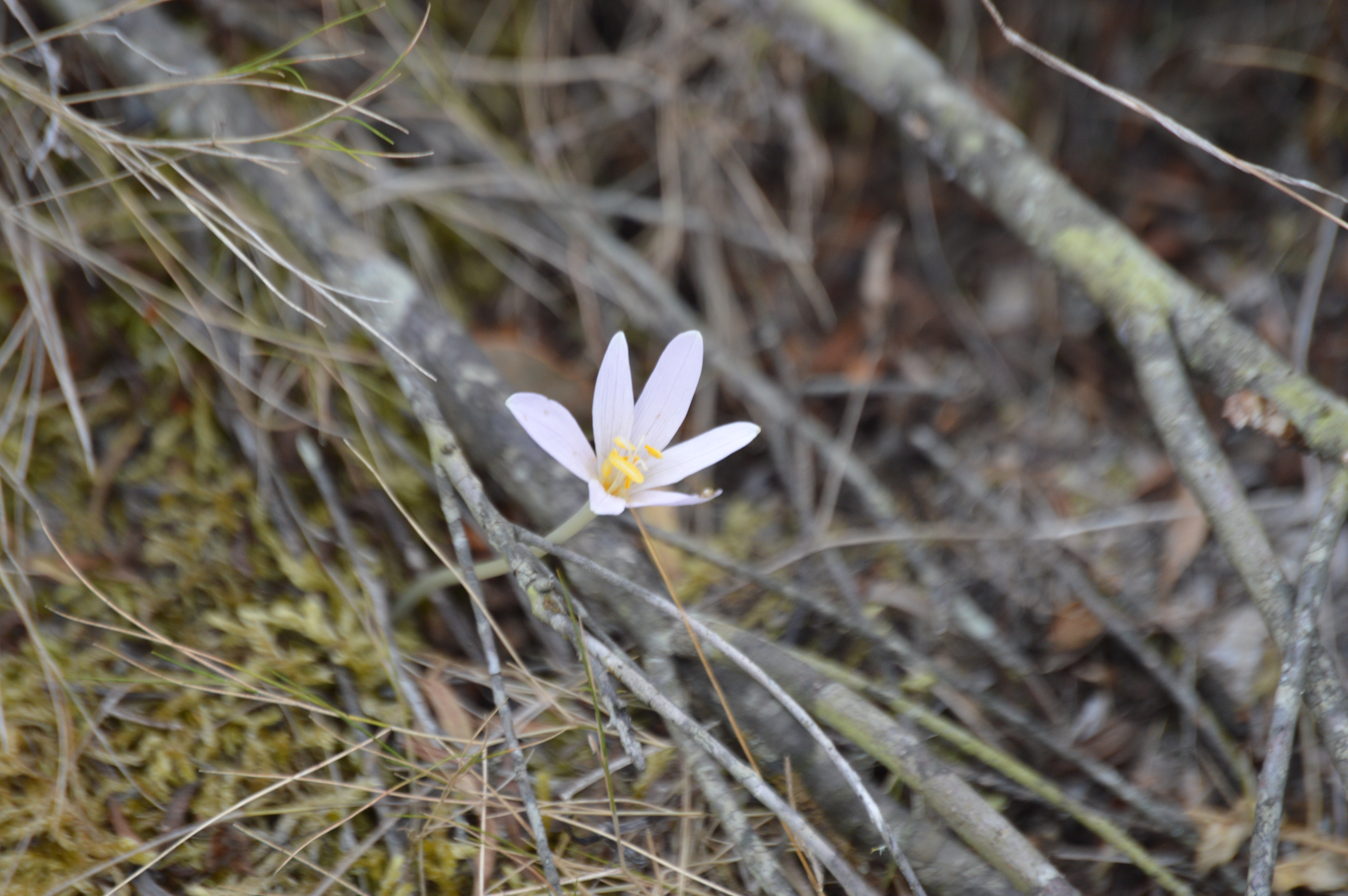
- Colchicum corsicum, Northeast Corsica

Conservation status
- Vulnerable (IUCN 3.1)

Scientific classification
- Kingdom: Plantae
- Clade: Tracheophytes
- Clade: Angiosperms
- Clade: Monocots
- Order: Liliales
- Family: Colchicaceae
- Genus: Colchicum
- Species: C. corsicum

Binomial name
- Colchicum corsicum Baker

Synonyms
- Colchicum neapolitanum var. corsicum (Baker) Fiori; Colchicum autumnale var. corsicum (Baker) Fiori

= Colchicum corsicum =

Species of plant

Colchicum corsicum is a species of flowering plant in the Colchicaceae family. It is native to the islands of Corsica and Sardinia in the Mediterranean.

Colchicum corsicum is a perennial growing from an underground corm. Some individuals have pink flowers, others white, the two very often being intermingled in different individuals within a given population.
