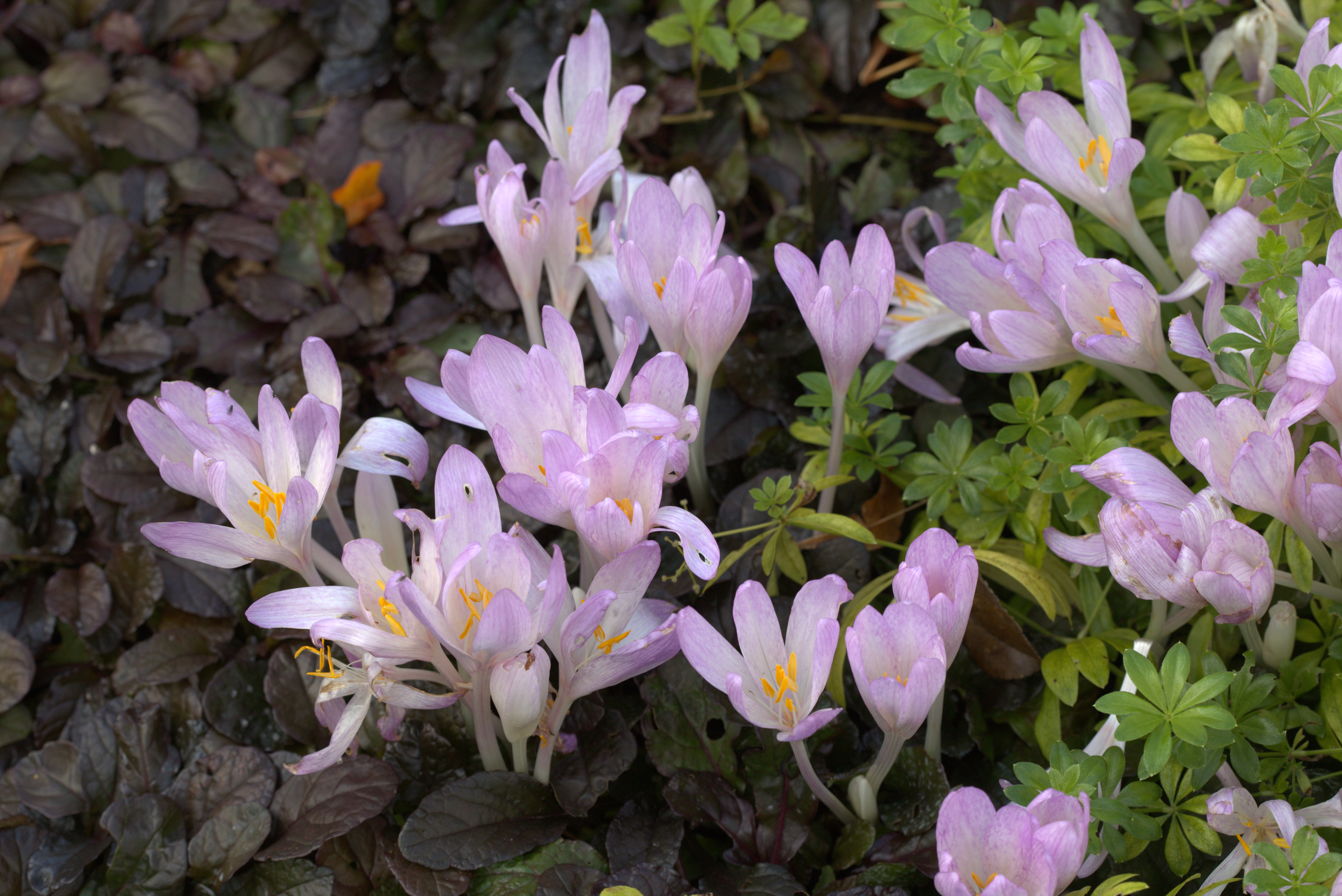

Scientific classification
- Kingdom: Plantae
- Clade: Tracheophytes
- Clade: Angiosperms
- Clade: Monocots
- Order: Liliales
- Family: Colchicaceae
- Genus: Colchicum
- Species: C. davisii

Binomial name
- Colchicum davisii C.D.Brickell

= Colchicum davisii =

Species of flowering plant

Colchicum davisii is a large-flowering plant species native to Turkey. The flowers are very pale pink and heavily tessellated with a white throat and prominent yellow anthers. They are produced in autumn. The corms, are elongated and have several growing points.
