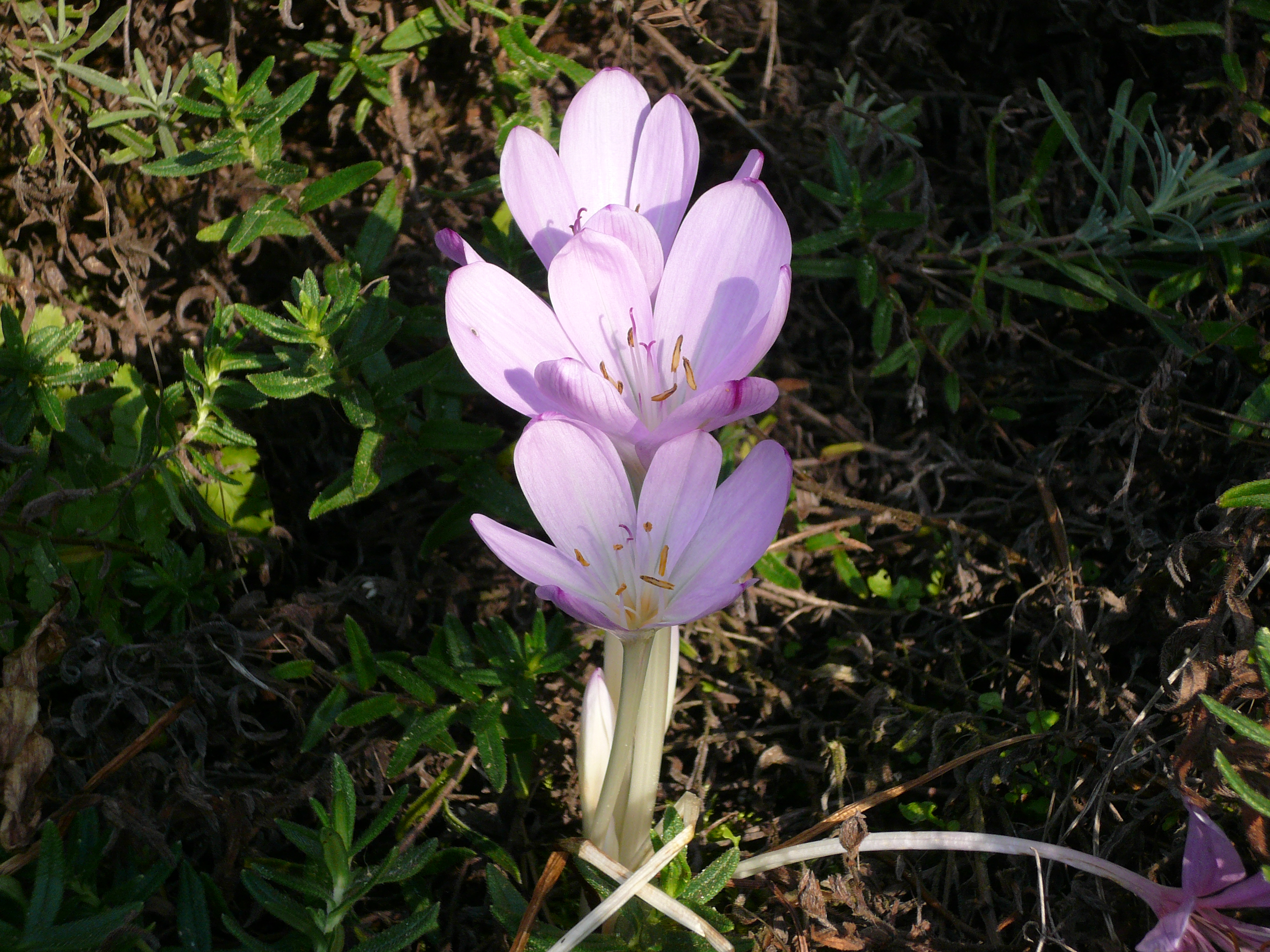
- Colchicum lusitanum

Scientific classification
- Kingdom: Plantae
- Clade: Tracheophytes
- Clade: Angiosperms
- Clade: Monocots
- Order: Liliales
- Family: Colchicaceae
- Genus: Colchicum
- Species: C. lusitanum

Binomial name
- Colchicum lusitanum Brot.

= Colchicum lusitanum =

Species of plant

Colchicum lusitanum is a species of flowering plant in the family Colchicaceae, native to southwest Europe and northwestern Africa.

== Distribution ==
C. lusitanum is native to the Iberian Peninsula, Balearic Islands, Morocco, Tunisia, Algeria, Sardinia, and northern and central Italy.
