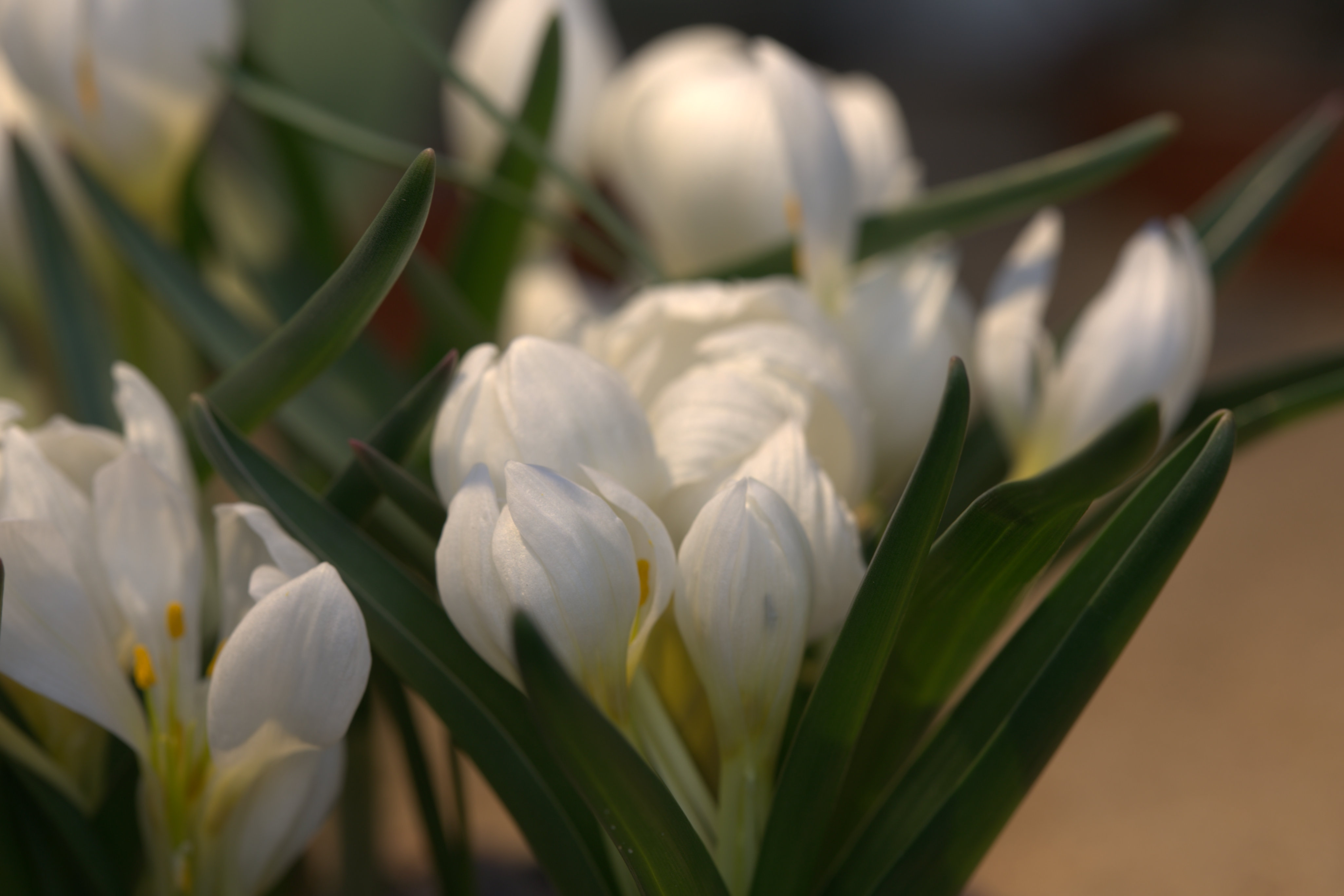

Scientific classification
- Kingdom: Plantae
- Clade: Tracheophytes
- Clade: Angiosperms
- Clade: Monocots
- Order: Liliales
- Family: Colchicaceae
- Genus: Colchicum
- Species: C. trigynum

Binomial name
- Colchicum trigynum (Adams) Stearn

Synonyms
- Merendera caucasica M.Bieb.; Bulbocodium trigynum Steven ex Adam in F.Weber & D.M.H.Mohr; Merendera trigyna (Steven ex Adam) Stapf; Sternbergia caucasica (M.Bieb.) Willd.; Colchicum caucasicum (M.Bieb.) Spreng.; Colchicum monogynum M.Bieb. ex Schult. & Schult.f. in J.J.Roemer & J.A.Schultes; Bulbocodium caucasicum (M.Bieb.) Endl. ex Heynh.; Merendera candidissima Miscz. ex Grossh.; Merendera trigyna var. ketzkhovelii Kuth. ex Sosn.; Merendera ghalghana Otsch.

= Colchicum trigynum =

Species of flowering plant

Colchicum trigynum is a species of plant native to Turkey, Iran and the Caucasus, often grown as an ornamental plant outside its native range.
