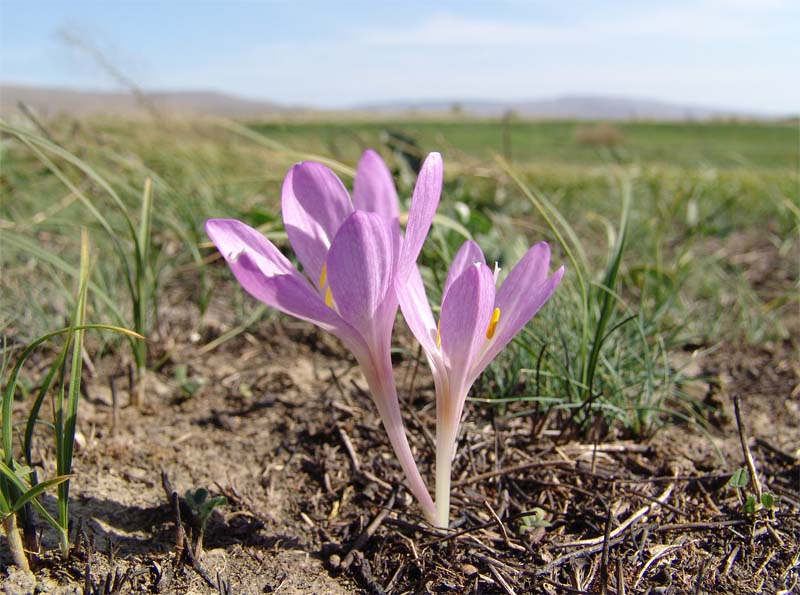

Scientific classification
- Kingdom: Plantae
- Clade: Embryophytes
- Clade: Tracheophytes
- Clade: Spermatophytes
- Clade: Angiosperms
- Clade: Monocots
- Order: Liliales
- Family: Colchicaceae
- Genus: Colchicum
- Species: C. laetum

Binomial name
- Colchicum laetum Steven

Synonyms
- Colchicum × byzantinum var. laetum (Steven) Nyman

= Colchicum laetum =

Species of flowering plant

Colchicum laetum is a species of Colchicum found in south east Russia through to the Caucasus.

A plant known in cultivation as C. laetum 'Pink Star' is thought to be a selection of Colchicum × byzantinum. It has flowers which are pale purple-pink with rounded ends; the petals of each bloom are often held parallel to the soil surface.
