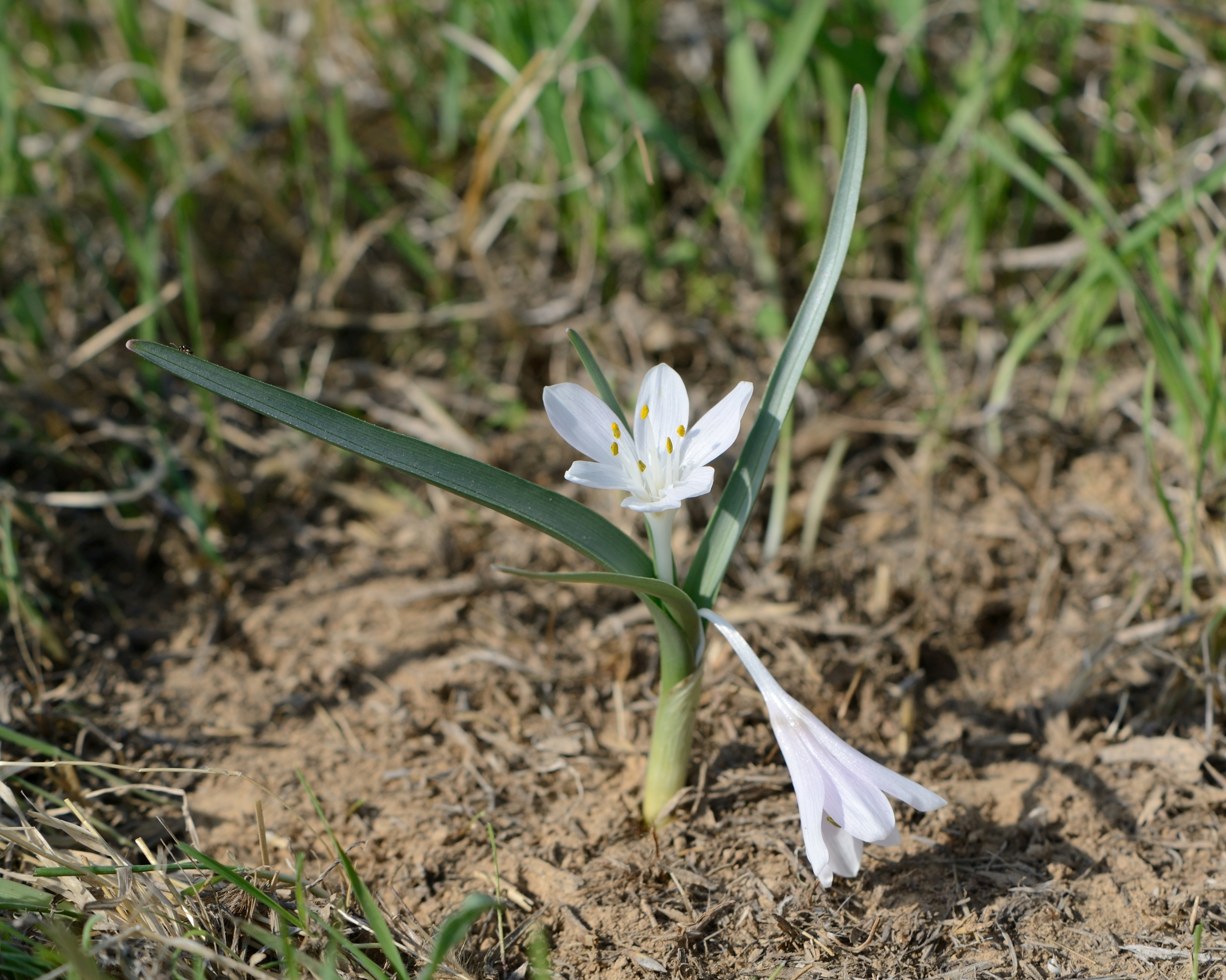

Scientific classification
- Kingdom: Plantae
- Clade: Tracheophytes
- Clade: Angiosperms
- Clade: Monocots
- Order: Liliales
- Family: Colchicaceae
- Genus: Colchicum
- Species: C. ritchii

Binomial name
- Colchicum ritchii R.Br.

Synonyms
- Colchicum aegyptiacum Boiss.; Colchicum ritchii var. pusillum Bég. & A.Vacc.; Colchicum stenopetalum Boiss. & Buhse ex Stef.; Colchicum ritchii f. pusillum (Bég. & A.Vacc.) Maire

= Colchicum ritchii =

Species of plant

Colchicum ritchii, or the Egyptian autumn crocus, is a plant species native to the southeastern Mediterranean east to the Arabian Peninsula.

== Description ==
Colchicum ritchii grows from a corm which is oval measuring 2-3.5 cm across, and covered with a loose brown skin. The leaves, which emerge and develop at the same time as the flowers, are largely hairless and elongate after flowering to form a cone which protects the developing fruits. The flowers which appear in December, January and February are white or pink, with plants with either colour frequently growing alongside each other. Each plant produces 2-10 flowers, which each have 6 tepals, 6 anthers and 3 styles. The inner tepals are ridged with just one, or at most very few teeth at the base, near the base of the anther. The anthers are black, but get covered by yellow pollen. The fruit is a green, irregularly shaped capsule, up to 35 mm long and 15 mm across which contains round, globular seeds.

== Habitat ==
Colchicum ritchii is a plant of sand and loess soils in desert and shrub-steppes .

== Distribution ==
Colchicum ritchii is found from Tunisia in the west to Jordan and Saudi Arabia.

== Uses ==
Extracts from Colchicum ritchii are used in traditional medicine to treat arthritis, rheumatism, gout and abdominal colics. Bedouin children dig up the corms from the desert to sell them after drying them to herbalists in Alexandria and other Egyptian cities. The anti-inflammatory drug colchicine was originally extracted from closely related species to this plant in ancient Egypt.

== Etymology ==
Colchicum ritchii was named by Robert Brown after Joseph Ritchie who he said was the first to observe the plant near Tripoli.
