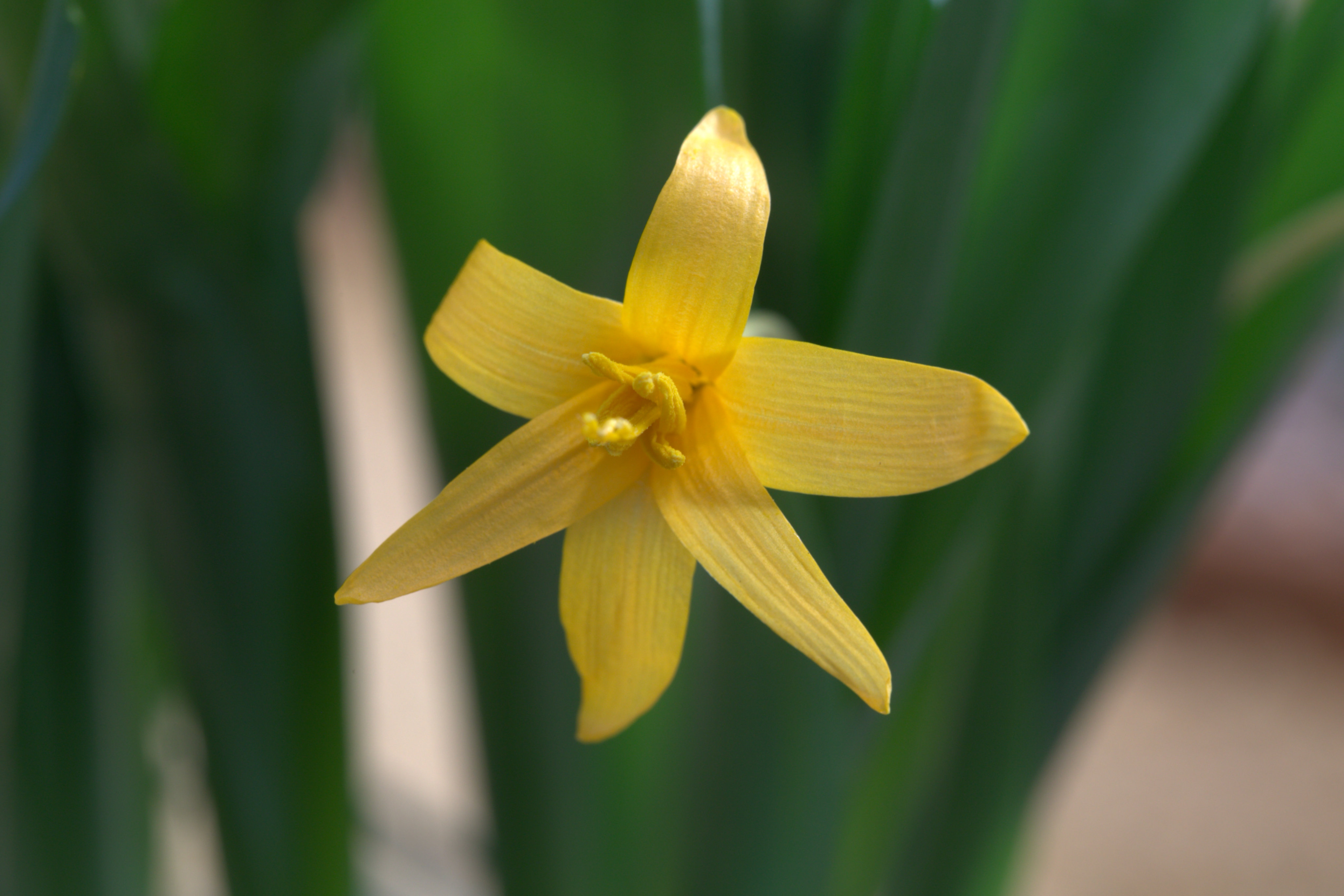
- Close-up of flower
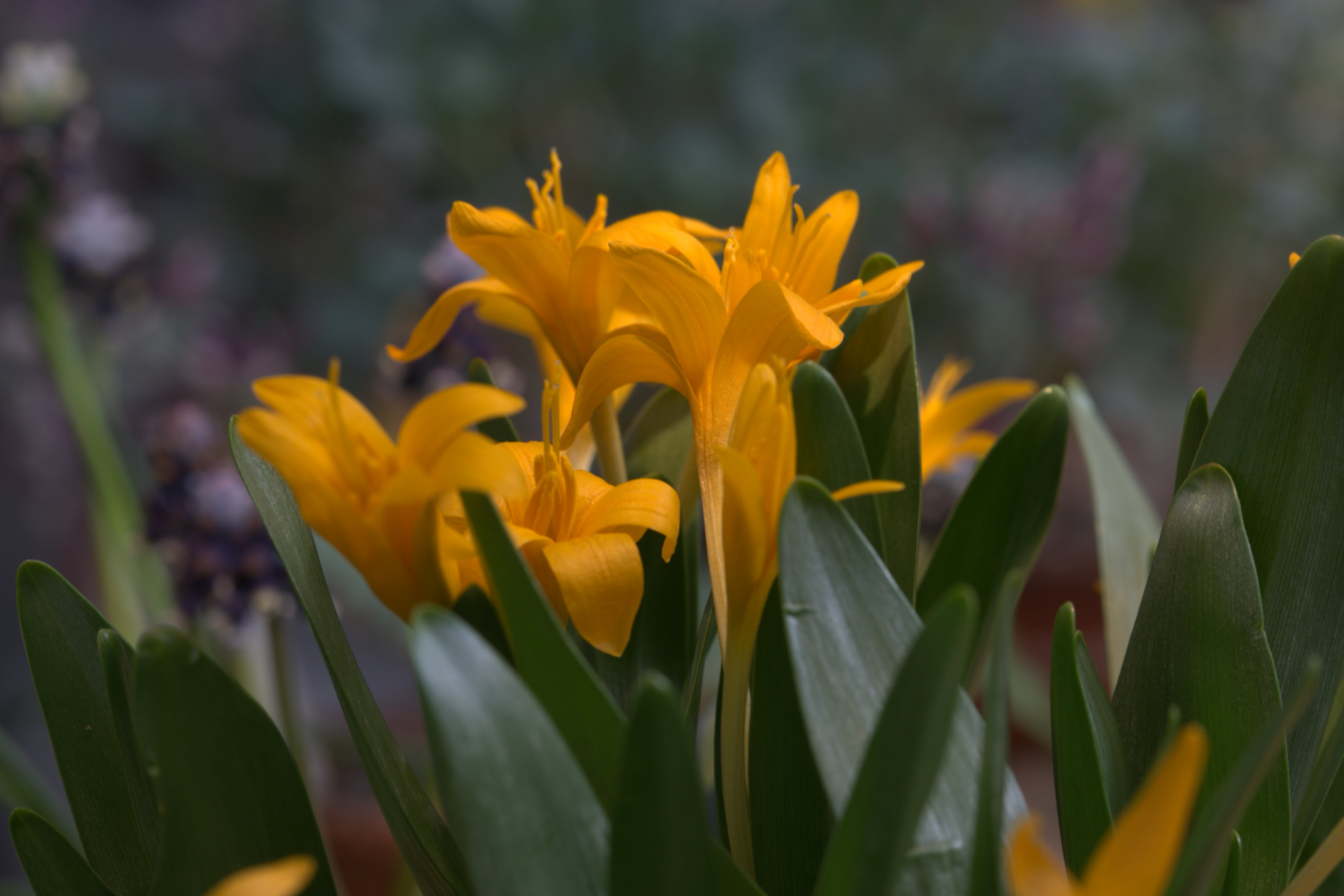
- Habit

Scientific classification
- Kingdom: Plantae
- Clade: Tracheophytes
- Clade: Angiosperms
- Clade: Monocots
- Order: Liliales
- Family: Colchicaceae
- Genus: Colchicum
- Species: C. luteum

Binomial name
- Colchicum luteum Baker

= Colchicum luteum =

Species of plant

Colchicum luteum, the yellow colchicum, is a species of flowering plant in the family Colchicaceae, native to Central Asia, Afghanistan, Pakistan, the western Himalayas, and Tibet. The only yellow-flowered member of its genus, a number of cultivars are available, including 'Golden Baby' and 'Vahsh'. The species is endemic and shows very restricted distribution due to the requirement of specific conditions for growth (low temperature, less humidity and soil type). In Lahaul (Himachal Pradesh, India) a place called 'Kukumseri' has been named after the species (Colchicum luteum) where, ‘Kukum’ means Colchicum luteum and ‘Seri’ means field. The place justifies its name due to the presence of a reasonably large number of species in the area.
