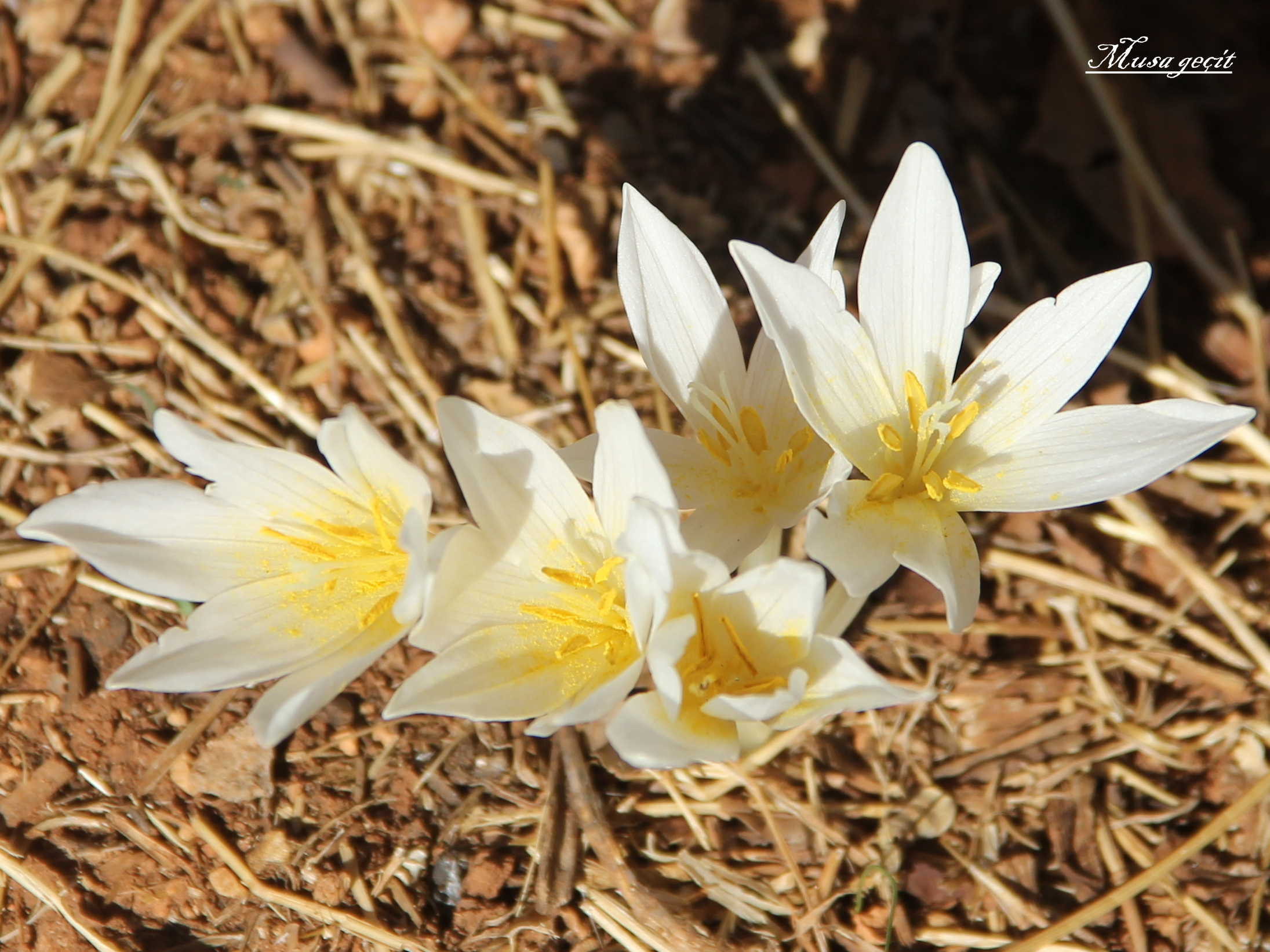
- Colchicum kotschyi

Scientific classification
- Kingdom: Plantae
- Clade: Embryophytes
- Clade: Tracheophytes
- Clade: Angiosperms
- Clade: Monocots
- Order: Liliales
- Family: Colchicaceae
- Genus: Colchicum
- Species: C. kotschyi

Binomial name
- Colchicum kotschyi Boiss.

Synonyms
- Colchicum candidum var. hirtiflorum Boiss.; Colchicum balansae var. hirtiflorum (Boiss.) Parsa; Merendera quadrifolia Stapf; Colchicum obtusifolium Siehe ex Hayek

= Colchicum kotschyi =

Species of flowering plant

Colchicum kotschyi is a species of flowering plant in the Colchicaceae family. It is native to Iran, Iraq and Turkey. It blooms relatively early for an autumn flowering colchicum, as early as August. The flowers often open to a pink-purple colour, but white flowered specimens are common in the wild. The plant reaches up to 2 m (6 ft) tall and grows well in sunny, warm locations.
