= Colchicum atropurpureum =

Scientific classification
- Kingdom: Plantae
- Clade: Tracheophytes
- Clade: Angiosperms
- Clade: Monocots
- Order: Liliales
- Family: Colchicaceae
- Genus: Colchicum
- Species: C. atropurpureum

Binomial name
- Colchicum atropurpureum Stapf ex Stearn

Species of flowering plant

Colchicum atropurpureum is a small flowered Colchicum which has blooms that open pink and then turn to a darker shade of red-purple. This plant is often confused with Colchicum autumnale. It is considered unresolved, or species inquirenda, according to The Plant List.

== Taxonomy ==
Colchicum atropurpureum was described in 1934 by William Stearn, based on a name proposed by Otto Stapf for plants cultivated in Cambridge University Botanic Garden. These plants were introduced into cultivation by a Dutch firm, allegedly from plants collected in the Meuse valley in France that may have been garden escapees. There are mentions to a Colchicum autumnale var. atropurpureum prior to the description of Colchicum atropurpureum, but it is unclear if these refer to the same species described by Stearn.

The species has since been considered a synonym of C. autumnale, but other authors have considered it more similar to C. turcicum. Due to the uncertainty surrounding the name, it has been proposed to consider it a cultivar, Colchicum 'Atropurpureum'.
