= Colchicum lingulatum =

Scientific classification
- Kingdom: Plantae
- Clade: Tracheophytes
- Clade: Angiosperms
- Clade: Monocots
- Order: Liliales
- Family: Colchicaceae
- Genus: Colchicum
- Species: C. lingulatum

Binomial name
- Colchicum lingulatum Boiss. & Spruner

Species of plant

Colchicum lingulatum is a species of flowering plant in the Colchicaceae family. It is native to north-western Turkey and to Greece. Colchicum lingulatum blooms in early autumn, with pink flowers approximately 3–4 cm (1" to 1.5") in size, with widely spaced petals. The stamens are a prominent yellow. The foliage begins to grow after the flowers.

== Subspecies ==
Two subspecies are recognized:

- Colchicum lingulatum subsp. lingulatum - Greece and Turkey
- Colchicum lingulatum subsp. rigescens K.Perss. - Turkey
