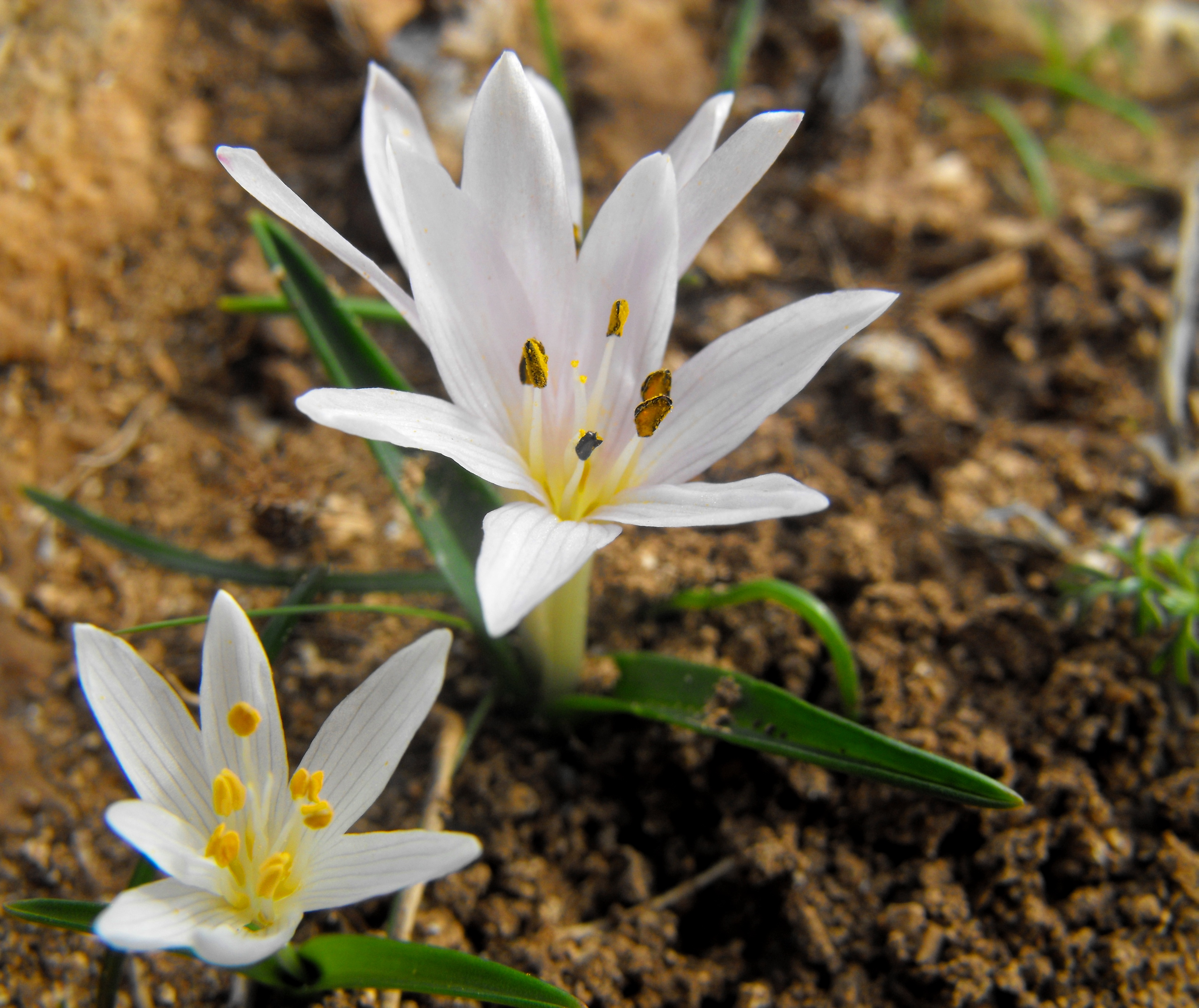

Scientific classification
- Kingdom: Plantae
- Clade: Tracheophytes
- Clade: Angiosperms
- Clade: Monocots
- Order: Liliales
- Family: Colchicaceae
- Genus: Colchicum
- Species: C. cupanii

Binomial name
- Colchicum cupanii Guss.

Synonyms
- Colchicum bertolonii var. angustifolium Tod.; Colchicum bertolonii var. cupanii (Guss.) Parl.; Colchicum montanum var. cupanii (Guss.) Fiori

= Colchicum cupanii =

Mediterranean meadow saffron

Species of plant

Colchicum cupanii is a widespread species of flowering plant in the family Colchicaceae, known as the Mediterranean meadow saffron. It grows around much of the central Mediterranean Basin, reported from France, Sardinia, Italy, Albania, Greece, Montenegro, Croatia, Sicily, Algeria, Malta and Tunisia.

Colchicum cupanii is quite variable. Some specimens have flowers that open completely to a star shape, while others remain cup-shaped. The pink to purple, untessellated flowers are small, up to 3 cm (1") in diameter, but are produced in abundance in the fall. The foliage is also produced in the fall.

== Subspecies ==
Two subspecies are recognized:

- Colchicum cupanii subsp. cupanii
- Colchicum cupanii subsp. glossophyllum (Heldr.) Rouy - Greece, Albania, Montenegro
