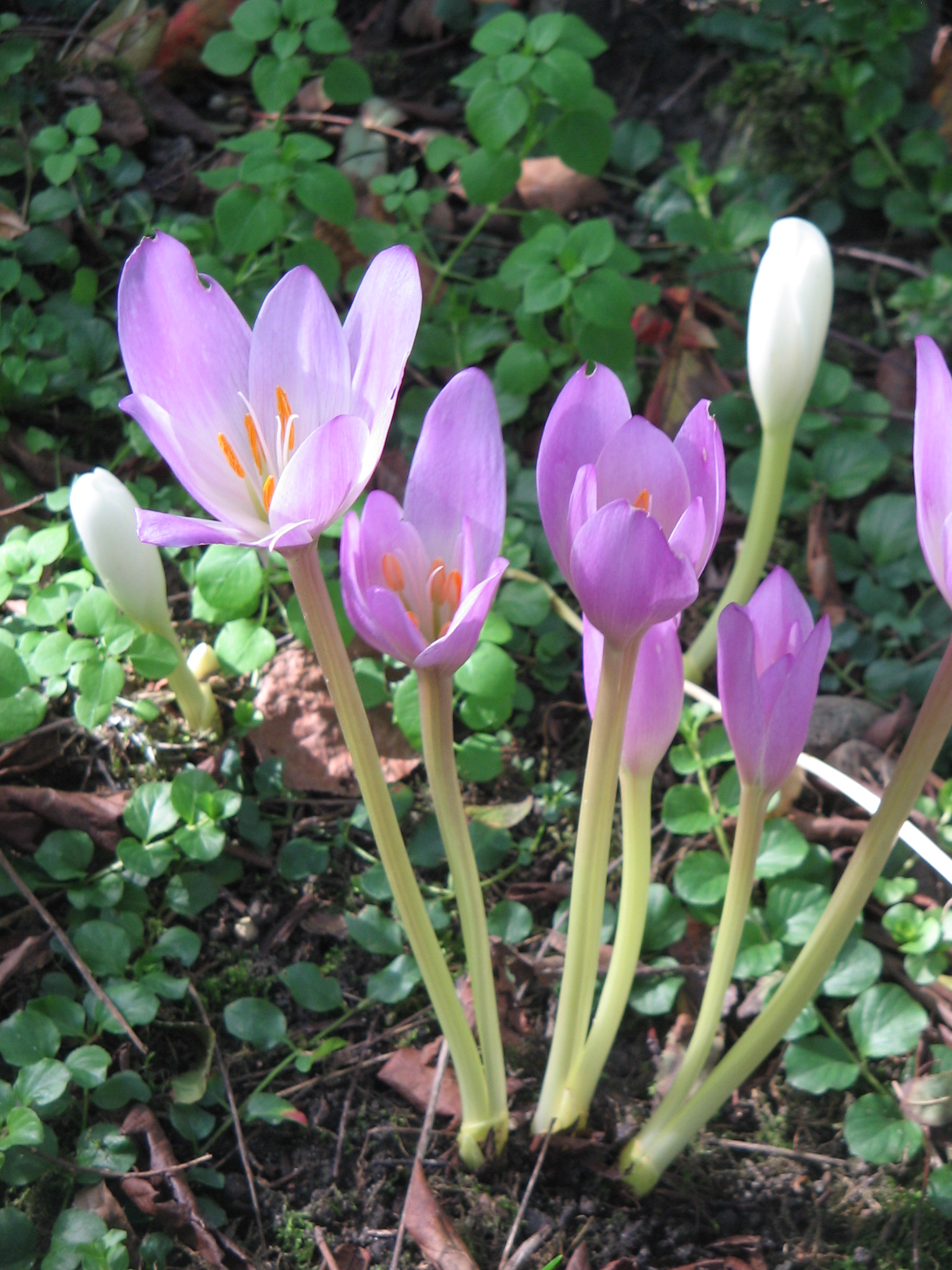
- Colchicum speciosum

Scientific classification
- Kingdom: Plantae
- Clade: Embryophytes
- Clade: Tracheophytes
- Clade: Spermatophytes
- Clade: Angiosperms
- Clade: Monocots
- Order: Liliales
- Family: Colchicaceae
- Genus: Colchicum; L.

Synonyms
- Abandium Adans.; Bulbocodium L.; Celsia Boehm. nom. illeg.; Eudesmis Raf. nom. superfl.; Fouha Pomel; Geophila Bergeret nom. reg.; Hermodactylum (R.Br.) Bartl. nom. inval.; Merendera Ramond; Monocaryum (R.Br.) Rchb.; Paludana Salisb. nom. illeg.; Synsiphon Regel

= Colchicum =

Genus of flowering plants

Colchicum (/ˈkɒltʃɪkəm/ KOL-chik-əm or /ˈkɒlkɪkəm/ KOL-kik-əm) is a genus of perennial flowering plants containing around 160 species which grow from bulb-like corms. It is a member of the botanical family Colchicaceae, and is native to West Asia, Europe, parts of the Mediterranean coast, down the East African coast to South Africa and the Western Cape. In this genus, the ovary of the flower is underground. As a consequence, the styles are extremely long in proportion, often more than 10 cm (4 in). All species in the genus are toxic.

== Common names ==
The common names autumn crocus, meadow saffron and naked lady may be applied to the whole genus or to many of its species; they refer to the "naked" crocus-like flowers that appear in late summer or autumn, long before the strap-like foliage which appears in spring.

Colchicum and Crocus look alike and can be confused by the casual observer. To add to the confusion, there are autumn-flowering species of crocus. However, colchicums have 3 styles and 6 stamens, while crocuses have 1 style supporting 3 long stigmas and 3 stamens. In addition, the corm structures are quite different—in Colchicum, the corm is irregular, while in crocuses, the corm is like a flattened ball. Crocus is in the iris family, Iridaceae.

== Etymology ==
The name of the genus derives from Κολχίς (Colchis), the Ancient Greek name for the region of კოლხეთი (Kolkhida) in modern Georgia (Caucasus). Colchis features in Greek mythology as the land to which the Argonauts journeyed in quest of the Golden Fleece and where Jason encountered Medea. The Greek toponym Colchis is thought by scholars to derive from the Urartian Qulḫa, pronounced "Kolcha" (guttural "ch" - as in Scots loch).

== Relationships ==
Colchicum melanthioides, also known as Androcymbium melanthioides, is probably the best known species from the tropical regions. In contrast to most temperate colchicums, the flower and leaves are produced at the same time, the white flowers usually in a small corymb that is enclosed by white bracts. Close relatives such as Colchicum scabromarginatum (Androcymbium scabromarginatum) and Colchicum coloratum (Androcymbium burchellii) have flowers with very short stalks and may be pollinated by rodents.

== Cultivation ==
Temperate colchicums are commonly grown in gardens as ornamental flowers. Species found in cultivation include:

- C. × agrippinum
- C. autumnale
- C. × byzantinum
- C. cilicicum
- C. lusitanum
- C. speciosum
- C. tenorei

There are also cultivars and hybrids such as:-

- C. 'Dick Trotter' (violet with white centre)
- C. 'Disraeli' (purple white),
- C. 'Giant' (red with white centre)
- C. 'Harlekijn' (white with purple band)
- C. 'Lilac Wonder' (lilac)
- C. 'Pink Goblet' agm (violet-purple)
- C. 'Poseidon' (purple)
- C. 'Rosy Dawn' agm (rose pink)
- C. 'Violet Queen' (purple)
- C. 'Waterlily' agm (double, lilac-pink)

Those marked agm have gained the Royal Horticultural Society's Award of Garden Merit (confirmed 2017).

In the United Kingdom, the National Collection of colchicums is maintained at Felbrigg Hall, Norfolk.

== Medicinal uses and poisonous properties ==
Plants in this genus contain toxic amounts of the alkaloid colchicine which is used pharmaceutically to treat gout and familial Mediterranean fever. The use of the roots and seeds in traditional medicine is thought to have arisen due to the presence of this drug.

Its leaves, corm and seeds are poisonous. Murderer Catherine Wilson is thought to have used it to poison a number of victims in the 19th century. The species known to contain the most lethal amount of colchicine is C. autumnale.

== Species ==
The following are the species included in the genus Colchicum. Many species previously classified in Androcymbium, Bulbocodium and Merendera were moved to Colchicum based on molecular genetic evidence. Androcymbium is currently considered a separate genus by some.

- Colchicum × agrippinum (probably a hybrid of garden origin)
- Colchicum alpinum DC. in J.B.A.M.de Lamarck & A.P.de Candolle
- Colchicum androcymbioides (Valdés) K.Perss.
- Colchicum antepense K.Perss.
- Colchicum antilibanoticum Gomb.
- Colchicum arenarium Waldst. & Kit.
- Colchicum arenasii Fridl.
- Colchicum asteranthum Vassiliades & K.M.Perss.
- Colchicum atropurpureum Stapf ex Stearn (unresolved name)
- Colchicum atticum Spruner ex Tommas.
- Colchicum autumnale L.
- Colchicum balansae Planch.
- Colchicum baytopiorum C.D.Brickell
- Colchicum bivonae Guss.
- Colchicum boissieri Orph.
- Colchicum bulbocodium Ker Gawl.
- Colchicum burttii Meikle
- Colchicum × byzantinum Ker Gawl.
- Colchicum chalcedonicum Azn.
- Colchicum chimonanthum K.Perss.
- Colchicum chlorobasis K.Perss.
- Colchicum cilicicum (Boiss.) Dammer
- Colchicum confusum K.Perss.
- Colchicum corsicum Baker
- Colchicum cretense Greuter
- Colchicum crocifolium Boiss.
- Colchicum cupanii Guss.
- Colchicum davisii C.D.Brickell
- Colchicum decaisnei Boiss.
- Colchicum doerfleri Halácsy
- Colchicum dolichantherum K.Perss.
- Colchicum eichleri (Regel) K.Perss.
- Colchicum euboeum (Boiss.) K.Perss.
- Colchicum fasciculare (L.) R.Br.
- Colchicum feinbruniae K.Perss.
- Colchicum figlalii (Varol) Parolly & Eren
- Colchicum filifolium (Cambess.) Stef.
- Colchicum freynii Bornm.
- Colchicum gonarei Camarda
- Colchicum graecum K.Perss.
- Colchicum greuteri (Gabrieljan) K.Perss.
- Colchicum haynaldii Heuff.
- Colchicum heldreichii K.Perss.
- Colchicum hierosolymitanum Feinbrun
- Colchicum hirsutum Stef.
- Colchicum hungaricum Janka
- Colchicum ignescens K.Perss.
- Colchicum imperatoris-friderici Siehe ex K.Perss.
- Colchicum inundatum K.Perss.
- Colchicum kesselringii Regel
- Colchicum kotschyi Boiss.
- Colchicum kurdicum (Bornm.) Stef.
- Colchicum laetum Steven
- Colchicum lagotum K.Perss.
- Colchicum leptanthum K.Perss.
- Colchicum lingulatum Boiss. & Spruner in P.E.Boissier
- Colchicum longifolium Castagne
- Colchicum lusitanum Brot.
- Colchicum luteum Baker
- Colchicum macedonicum Kosanin
- Colchicum macrophyllum B.L.Burtt
- Colchicum manissadjianii (Azn.) K.Perss.
- Colchicum micaceum K.Perss.
- Colchicum micranthum Boiss.
- Colchicum minutum K.Perss.
- Colchicum mirzoevae (Gabrieljan) K.Perss.
- Colchicum montanum L.
- Colchicum multiflorum Brot.
- Colchicum munzurense K.Perss.
- Colchicum nanum K.Perss.
- Colchicum neapolitanum (Ten.) Ten.
- Colchicum parlatoris Orph.
- Colchicum parnassicum Sart., Orph. & Heldr. in P.E.Boissier
- Colchicum paschei K.Perss.
- Colchicum peloponnesiacum Rech.f. & P.H.Davis
- Colchicum persicum Baker
- Colchicum polyphyllum Boiss. & Heldr. in P.E.Boissier
- Colchicum pulchellum K.Perss.
- Colchicum pusillum Sieber
- Colchicum raddeanum (Regel) K.Perss.
- Colchicum rausii K.Perss.
- Colchicum ritchii R.Br.
- Colchicum robustum (Bunge) Stef.
- Colchicum sanguicolle K.Perss.
- Colchicum schimperi Janka ex Stef.
- Colchicum serpentinum Woronow ex Miscz.
- Colchicum sfikasianum Kit Tan & Iatroú
- Colchicum sieheanum Hausskn. ex Stef.
- Colchicum soboliferum (C.A.Mey.) Stef.
- Colchicum speciosum Steven
- Colchicum stevenii Kunth
- Colchicum szovitsii Fisch. & C.A.Mey.
- Colchicum trigynum (Steven ex Adam) Stearn
- Colchicum triphyllum Kunze
- Colchicum troodi Kotschy in F.Unger & C.G.T.Kotschy
- Colchicum tunicatum Feinbrun
- Colchicum turcicum Janka
- Colchicum tuviae Feinbrun
- Colchicum umbrosum Steven
- Colchicum varians (Freyn & Bornm.) Dyer in B.D.Jackson
- Colchicum variegatum L.
- Colchicum wendelboi K.Perss.
- Colchicum woronowii Bokeriya
- Colchicum zahnii Heldr.

== Sources ==
- Suite 101. Plants and Bulbs: Hardy Fall-Blooming Bulbs for Your Garden
- Veseys: Information for gardeners
- A Handbook of Crocus and Colchicum for Gardeners, Bowles, E. A., D. Van Nostrand Company, Inc., 1952
- The European Garden Flora: A Manual for the Identification of Plants Cultivated in Europe, both Out-of-Doors and Under Glass, Volume 1, Walters, S. M., et al., editors, Cambridge University Press, 1984
