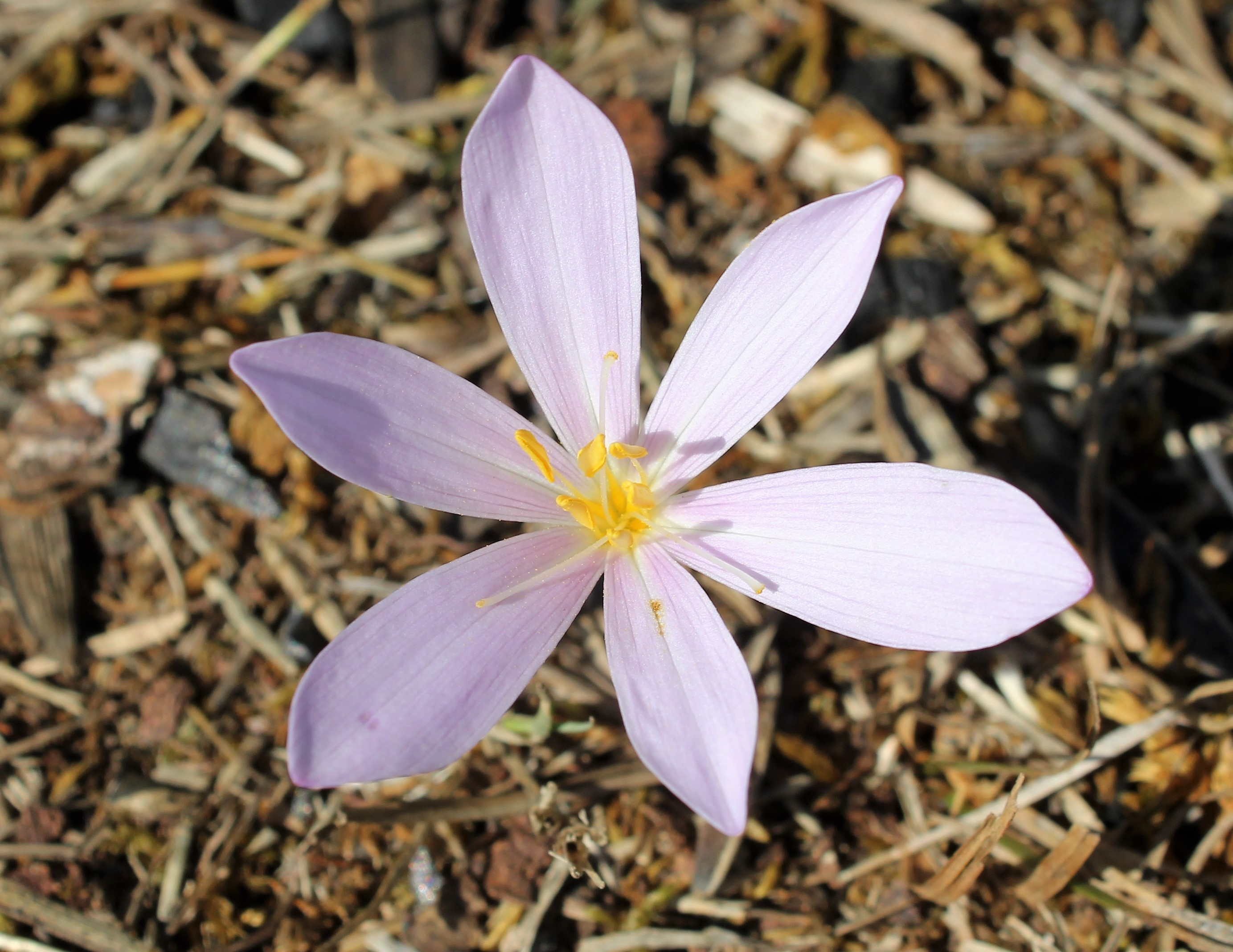

Scientific classification
- Kingdom: Plantae
- Clade: Tracheophytes
- Clade: Angiosperms
- Clade: Monocots
- Order: Liliales
- Family: Colchicaceae
- Genus: Colchicum
- Species: C. micranthum

Binomial name
- Colchicum micranthum Boiss.

Synonyms
- Colchicum parvulum Janka

= Colchicum micranthum =

Species of flowering plant

Colchicum micranthum is a species of flowering plant in the family Colchicaceae. It is native to Turkey with nearly white flowers barely 2 cm (.75") tall. It produces a series of blooms throughout the fall. The leaves follow the flowers, and are usually 3–5 in number.
