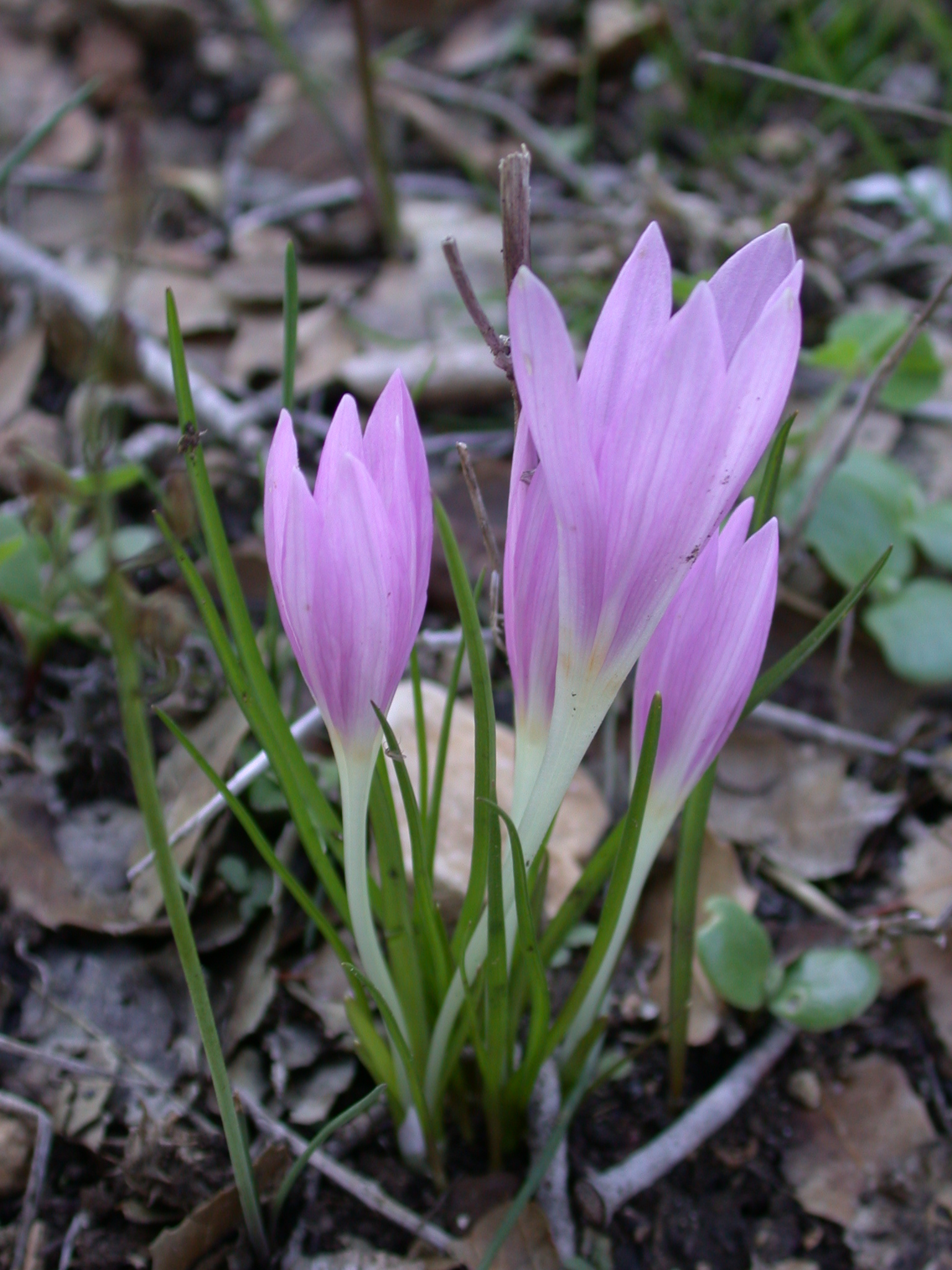

Scientific classification
- Kingdom: Plantae
- Clade: Tracheophytes
- Clade: Angiosperms
- Clade: Monocots
- Order: Liliales
- Family: Colchicaceae
- Genus: Colchicum
- Species: C. stevenii

Binomial name
- Colchicum stevenii Kunth

= Colchicum stevenii =

Species of flowering plant

Colchicum stevenii, or Steven's meadow saffron, is a species of flowering plant in the family Colchicaceae. Hebrew: סתוונית היורה, Arabic: سَراجُ الغولة, سُورَنْجان

== Description ==
Perennial. Corm oblong, tunics blackish prolonged along the sheath. Leaves 5-7, glabrous, very narrow, appearing at the same time as flowers. Flowers fasciculate, 3-10, short, pink, surrounded with a transparent sheath. Tube 5-6 times longer than perianth. Tepals obtuse or subacute, 20 mm long over 2–3 mm wide. Stamens yellowish, a little shorter than the filiform styles. It flowers in October–December, coinciding with the onset of the rainy season in the Levant, and is one of the first autumn flowers to bloom. Its violet-pink flowers will cover the burnt-out vegetation overnight after the very first rain.

== Taxonomy ==
Colchicum stevenii was first described by Kunth in 1843. The specific epithet stevenii honours Christian von Steven, author of various transactions of the Imperial Society of Naturalists of Moscow published since 1838.

== Distribution and habitat ==
C. stevenii is native to the eastern Mediterranean: Cyprus, the East Aegean Islands, Lebanon, Syria, the Palestine region and Turkey. It is found in fields, meadows, woodland, rocky places along coasts, and lower and middle elevation mountains.

== Chemistry ==
Colchicum species contain colchicine, a substance capable of doubling the chromosome numbers of young dividing cells thus causing genetical changes in the tissues which may be useful in agriculture.

Meadow saffrons were known to the ancients as a dangerous poison (see Colchicum brachyphyllum), and they are presently used as medicinal plants for the treatment of gout, the active agent being the colchicine they contain.
