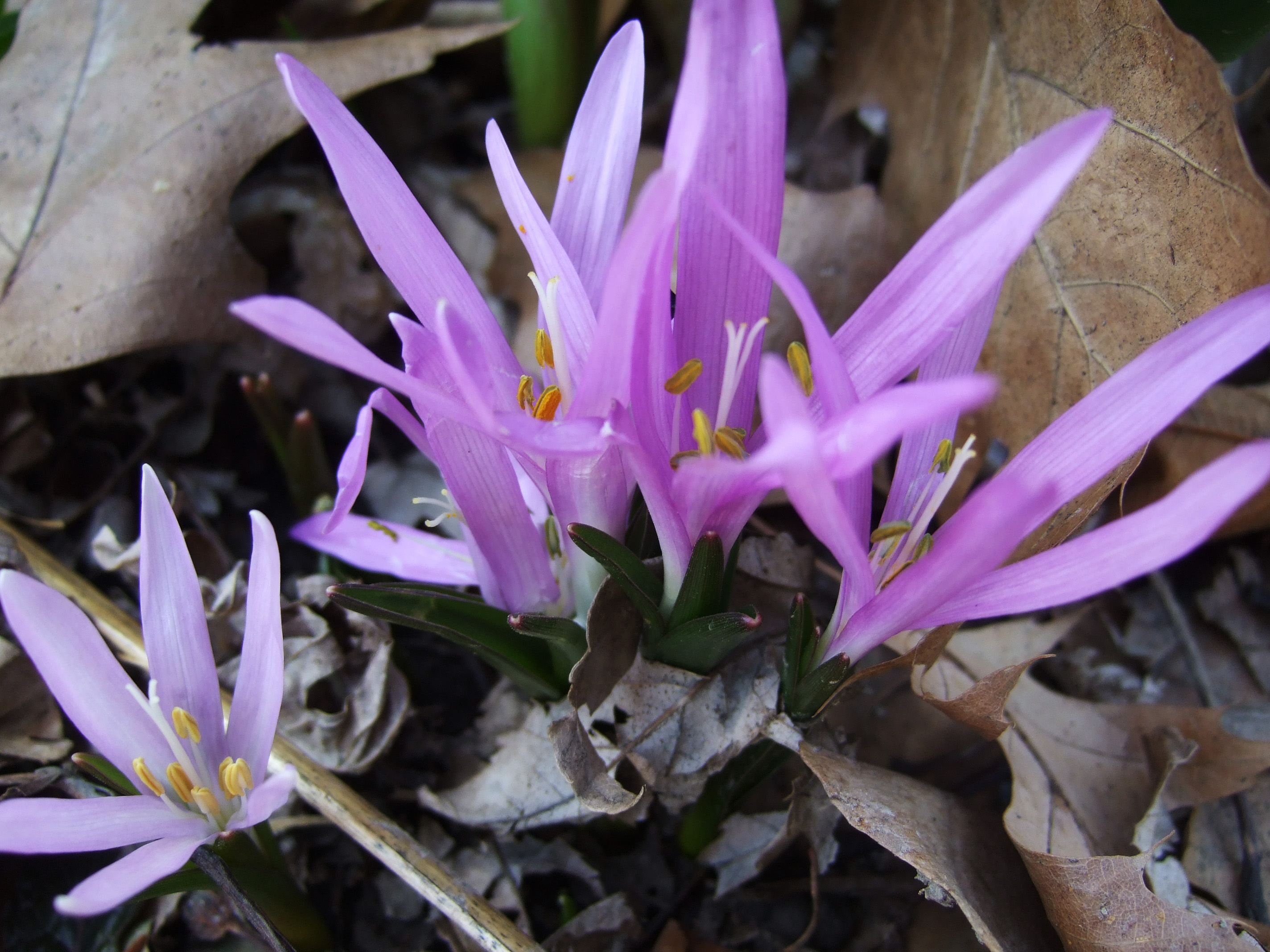

Scientific classification
- Kingdom: Plantae
- Clade: Tracheophytes
- Clade: Angiosperms
- Clade: Monocots
- Order: Liliales
- Family: Colchicaceae
- Genus: Colchicum
- Species: C. bulbocodium

Binomial name
- Colchicum bulbocodium Ker Gawl.

Synonyms
- Bulbocodium vernum L.; Colchicum vernum (L.) Stef; Merendera verna (L.) Bubani

= Colchicum bulbocodium =

Spring meadow saffron

Species of plant

Colchicum bulbocodium, the spring meadow saffron, is a species of alpine bulbous plant native to mountain ranges across Europe from the Pyrenees to the Caucasus (Spain, France, Italy, Switzerland, Austria, Hungary,Bosnia, Romania, the former Yugoslavia, Ukraine and southern European Russia).

It is cultivated as an ornamental plant in many places. It has flowers considered ideal for the rock garden, which is beautiful en masse. The plant is a hardy spring flower bulb, very small in size, reaching about 7–10 cm high. From April to June, the strap-shaped leaves emerge with pink-to-purple crocus-like flowers, 3–8 cm in diameter. As all the species of the genus Colchicum, the species is a poisonous plant.

== Subspecies and varieties ==
Three infraspecific taxa of the species are currently recognized:

- Colchicum bulbocodium subsp. bulbocodium
  - var. bulbocodium
  - var. edentatum (Schur) K.Perss (syn. Bulbocodium edentatum Schur.) is indigenous to Romania.
- Colchicum bulbocodium subsp. versicolor (Ker Gawl.) K. Perss. (syn. Bulbocodium versicolor (Ker Gawl.) Spreng.) is native in Eastern Europe and the Caucasus. The plant is in all its parts smaller than Colchicum bulbocodium subsp. bulbocodium.
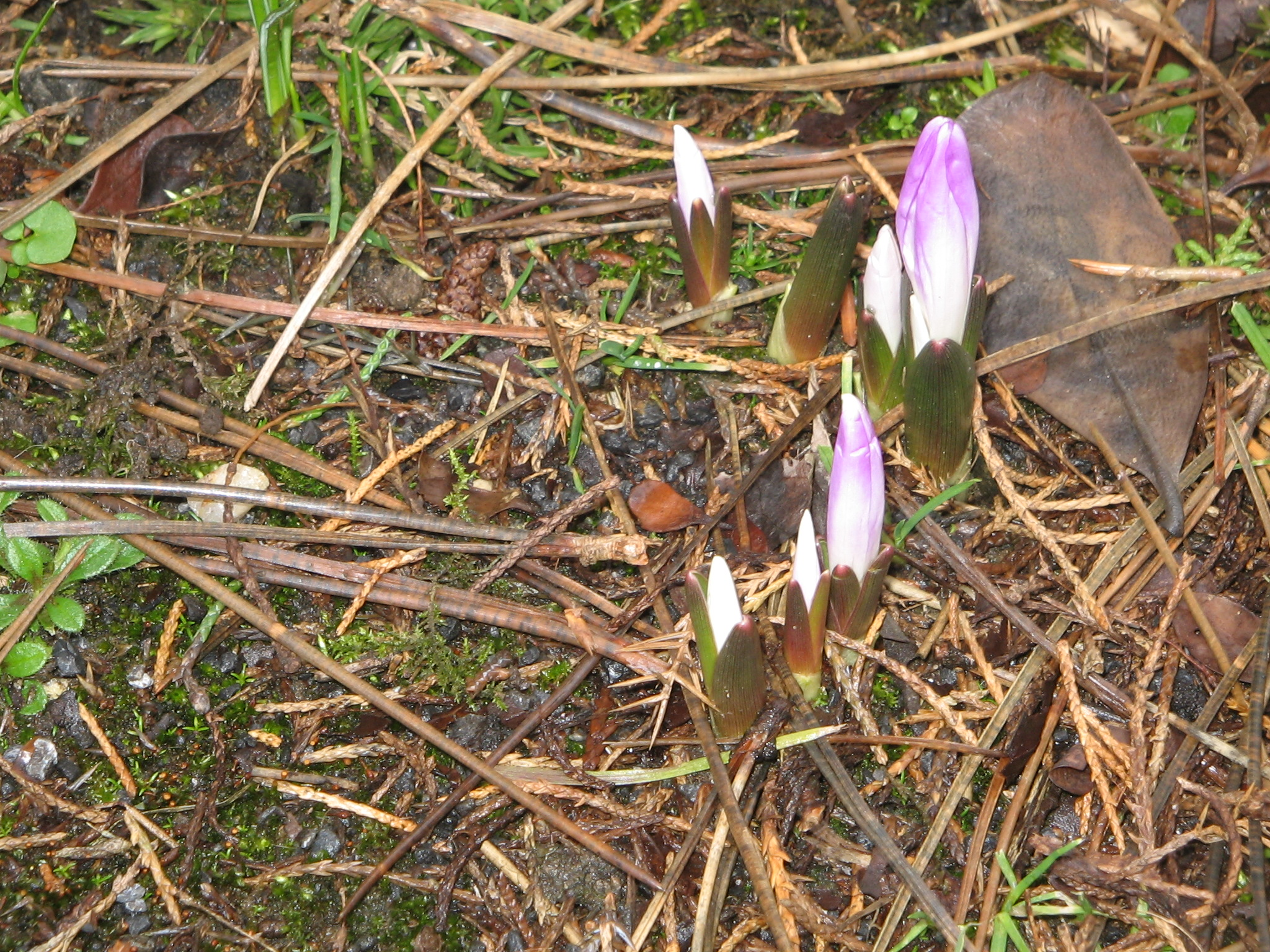
Flower buds

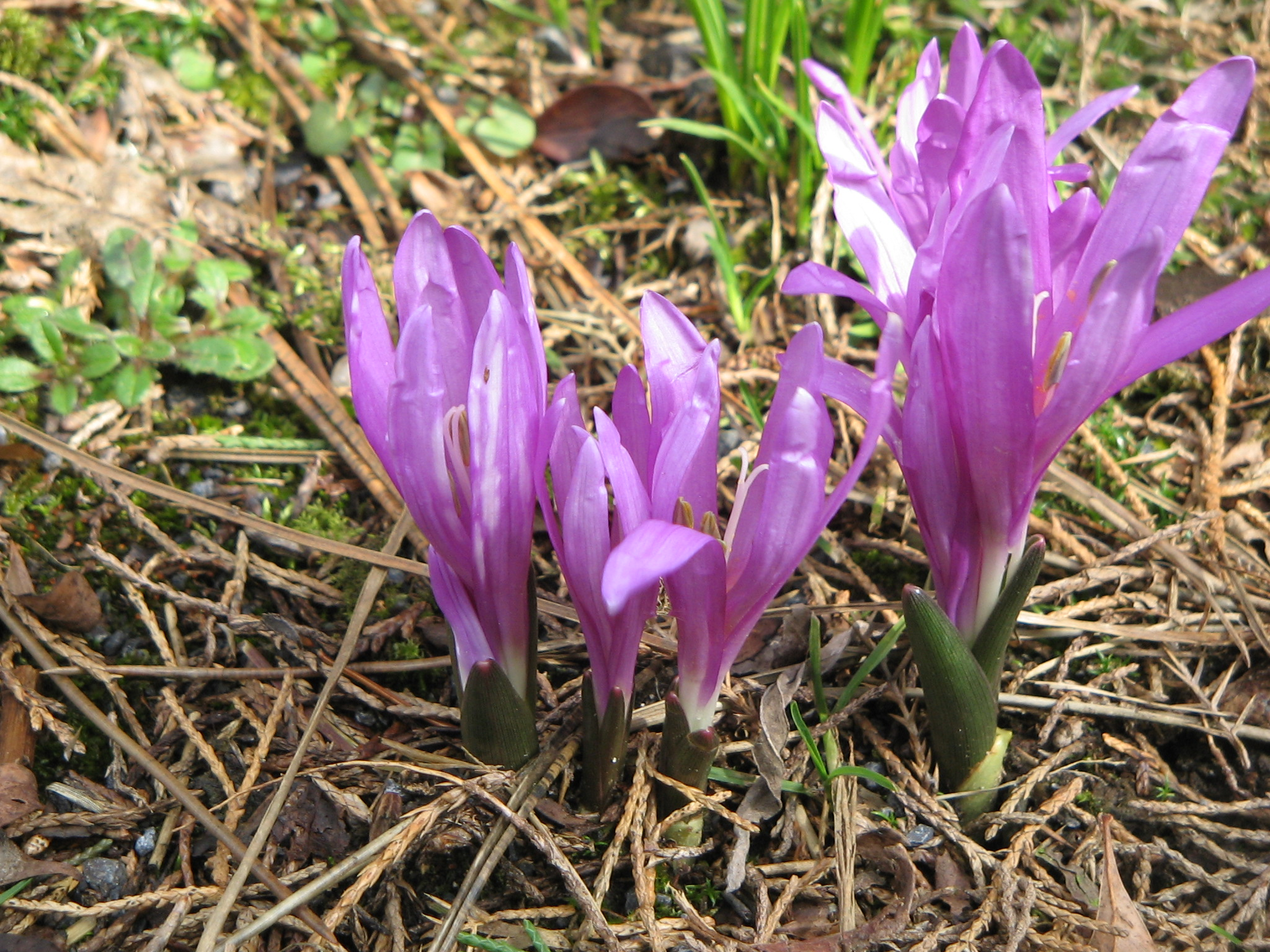
Flowering plants in a garden

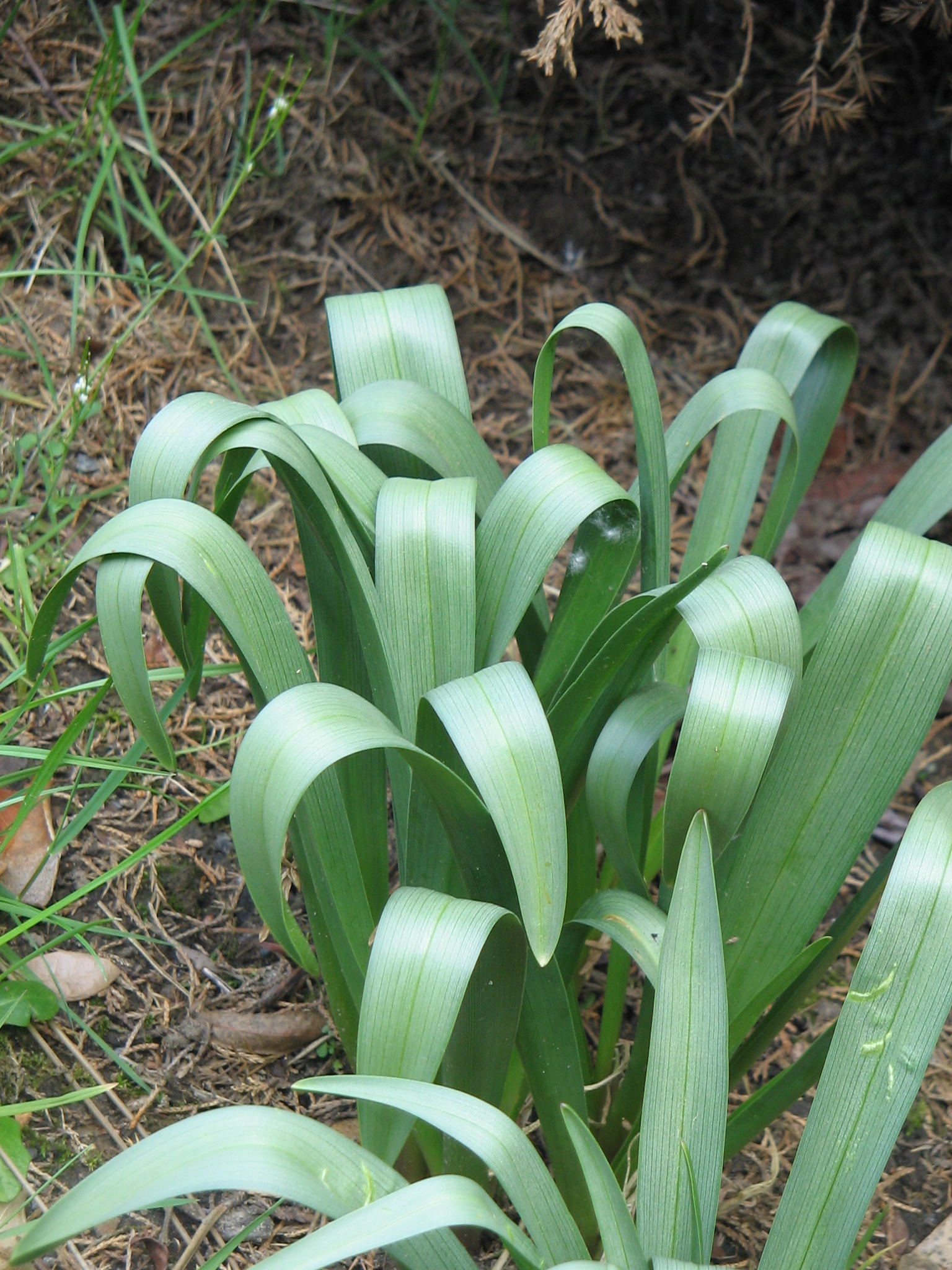
Leaf in the late spring

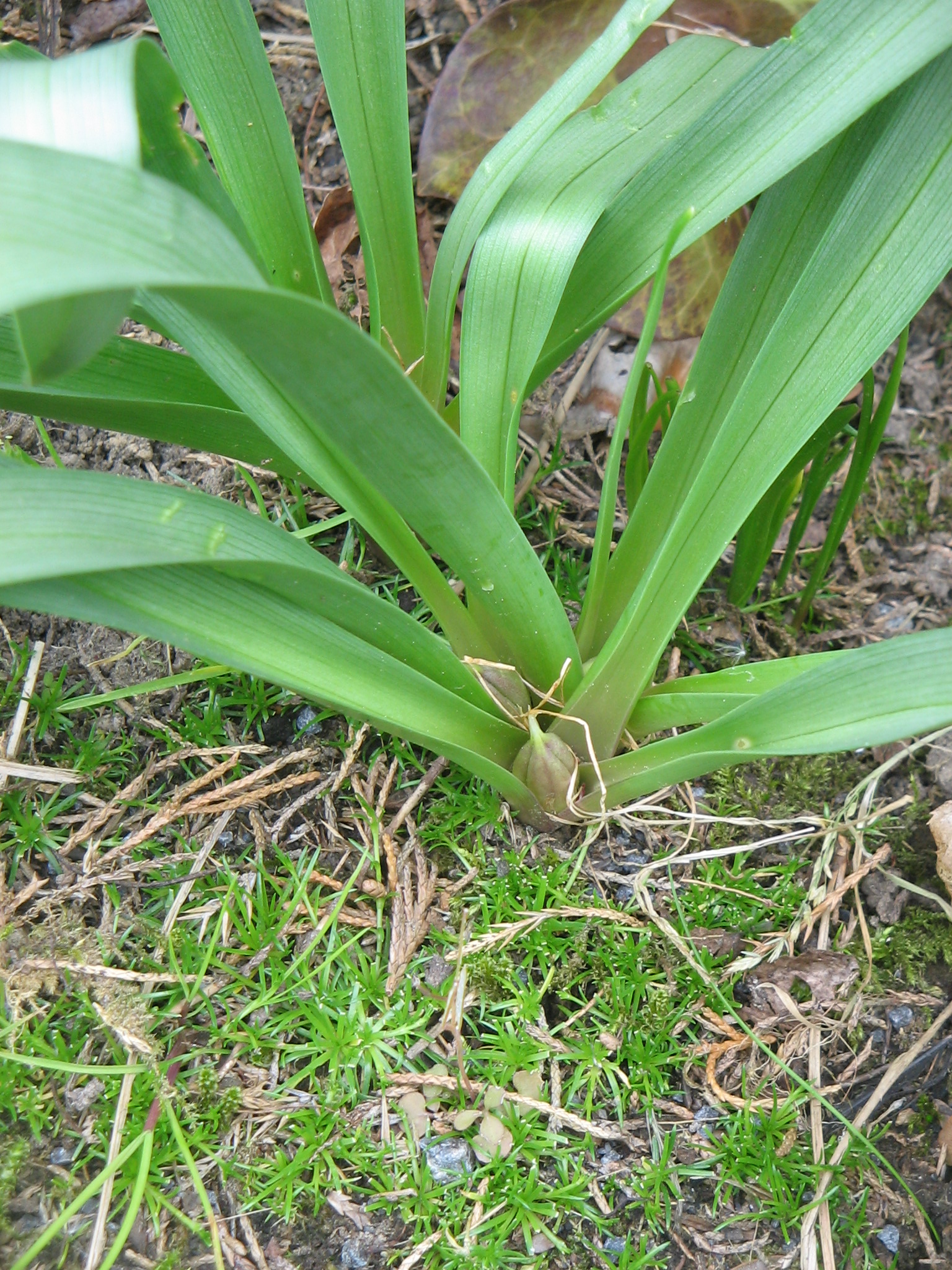
Leaf and fruit
