= Colchicum parnassicum =

Conservation status
- Least Concern (IUCN 3.1)

Scientific classification
- Kingdom: Plantae
- Clade: Tracheophytes
- Clade: Angiosperms
- Clade: Monocots
- Order: Liliales
- Family: Colchicaceae
- Genus: Colchicum
- Species: C. parnassicum

Binomial name
- Colchicum parnassicum Sart., Orph. & Heldr.

Synonyms
- Colchicum lingulatum var. parnassicum (Sart., Orph. & Heldr.) Stef.; Colchicum neapolitanum Orph. ex Nyman

Species of flowering plant

Colchicum parnassicum is a species of flowering plant in the family Colchicaceae. It is endemic to the Sterea Ellada region of central Greece. It is closely related to Colchicum autumnale, mainly being different in having shorter flowers. It blooms in the autumn season into medium pink flowers, which hold up well in the autumn weather. This species, if cultivated in cold climates, will do better in a sunny, sheltered location.
