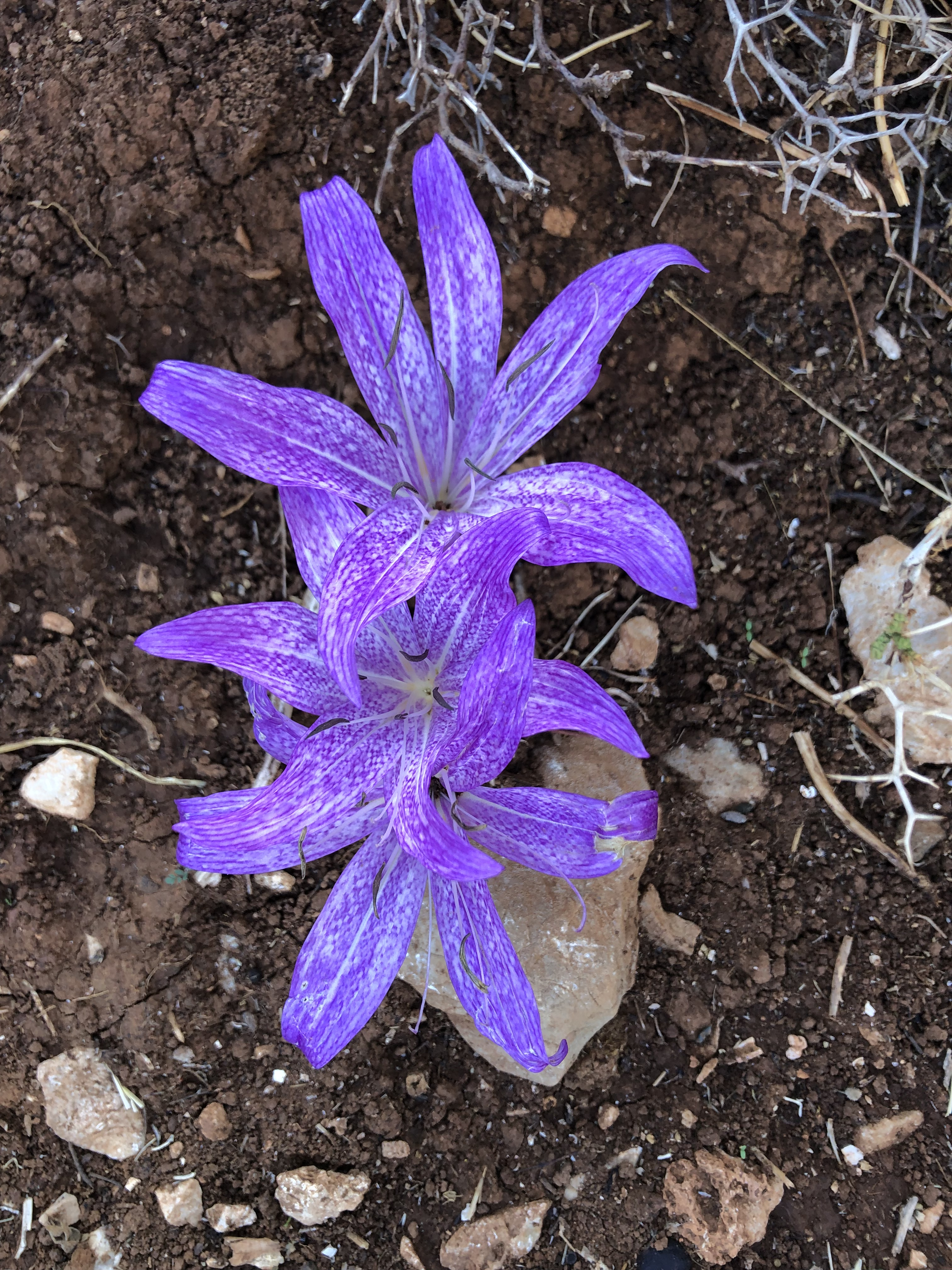

Scientific classification
- Kingdom: Plantae
- Clade: Tracheophytes
- Clade: Angiosperms
- Clade: Monocots
- Order: Liliales
- Family: Colchicaceae
- Genus: Colchicum
- Species: C. macrophyllum

Binomial name
- Colchicum macrophyllum B.L.Burtt

Synonyms
- Colchicum latifolium var. longistylum Pamp.

= Colchicum macrophyllum =

Species of flowering plant

Colchicum macrophyllum has large, funnel-shaped flowers in the fall with much tessellation throughout the bloom. The colour is rosy-purple and white. The leaves that it produces in the spring are large, up to 16" (40 cm) long, among the largest of all colchicum species.

This plant is native to the area around the Aegean Sea (Turkey and Greece including Crete).
