= Colchicum balansae =

Scientific classification
- Kingdom: Plantae
- Clade: Tracheophytes
- Clade: Angiosperms
- Clade: Monocots
- Order: Liliales
- Family: Colchicaceae
- Genus: Colchicum
- Species: C. balansae

Binomial name
- Colchicum balansae Planch.

Synonyms
- Colchicum candidum Schott & Kotschy ex Baker

Species of flowering plant

Colchicum balansae is a variable species of flowering plant in the family Colchicaceae, producing white to rosy-purple flowers in the autumn season. The flowers are borne low to the ground, but can come from bulbs 50 cm (20") below the soil surface. The leaves are absent at flowering time; they start growing in the spring and can reach up to 30 cm (12") long. This species is native to southern Turkey and to Greece (Attica, Poros, Rhodes).
