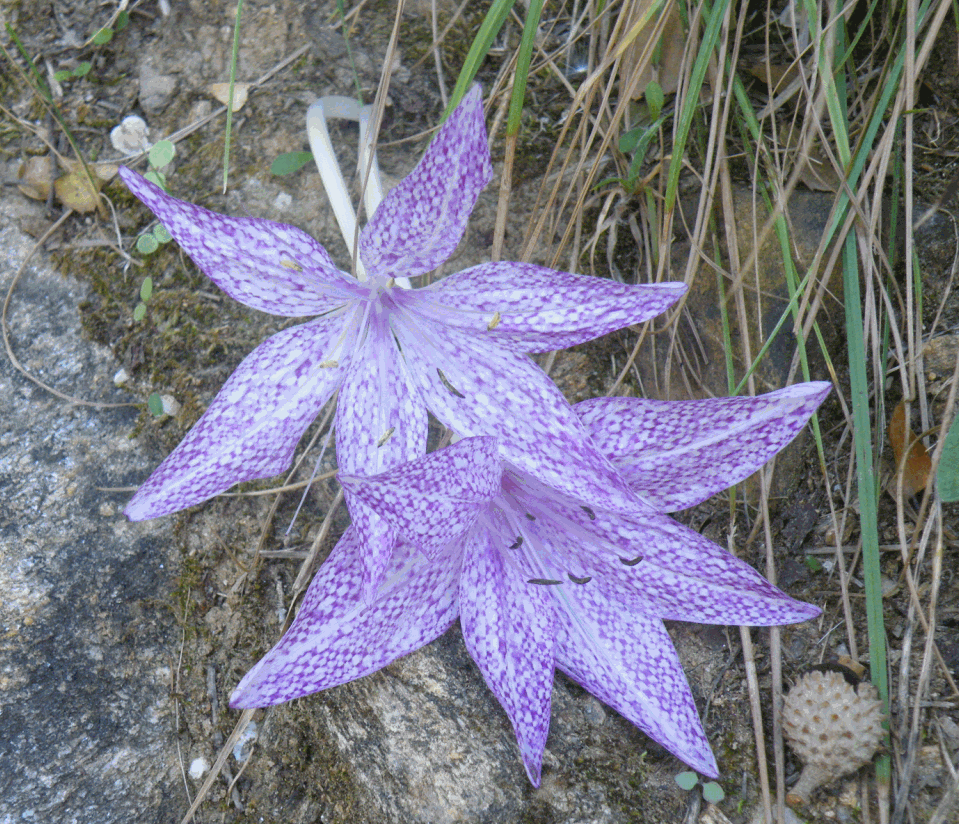

Scientific classification
- Kingdom: Plantae
- Clade: Tracheophytes
- Clade: Angiosperms
- Clade: Monocots
- Order: Liliales
- Family: Colchicaceae
- Genus: Colchicum
- Species: C. variegatum

Binomial name
- Colchicum variegatum L.

Synonyms
- List: Colchicum tessellatum Salisb.; Colchicum tessulatum Mill.; Colchicum chionense Haw. ex Kunth; Colchicum parkinsonii Hook.f.; Colchicum variegatum subsp. parkinsonii (Hook.f.) K.Richt.; Colchicum variegatum f. decolorans Candargy; Colchicum variegatum var. desii Pamp.

= Colchicum variegatum =

Species of plant

Colchicum variegatum is a species of plant native to Greece and Turkey and cultivated in many other places.

Colchicum variegatum is a perennial herb forming an underground corm. Tepals are broadly lanceolate, white, mottled with numerous brown or purple markings, sometimes taking the form of spots, other times forming a checkerboard or chessboard pattern.
