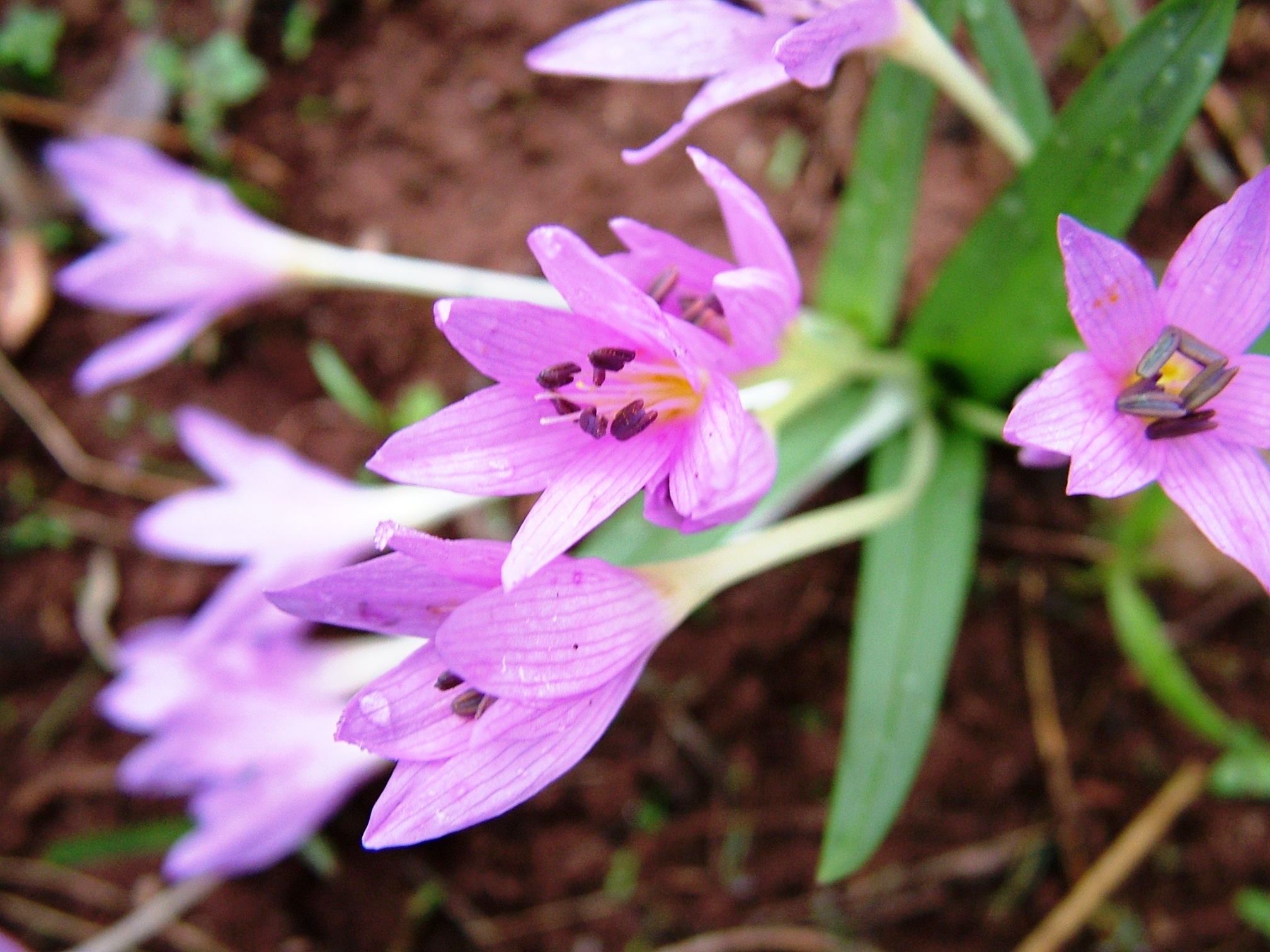

Scientific classification
- Kingdom: Plantae
- Clade: Tracheophytes
- Clade: Angiosperms
- Clade: Monocots
- Order: Liliales
- Family: Colchicaceae
- Genus: Colchicum
- Species: C. pusillum

Binomial name
- Colchicum pusillum Sieber

= Colchicum pusillum =

Species of flowering plant

Colchicum pusillum is a species of perennial flowering plant in the family Colchicaceae that is easily identified by its up to 6 narrow (2mm or 1/16") leaves produced during or shortly after flowering. The flowers are star shaped and pale pink in colour. Its native region is Crete, Greece and Cyprus.
