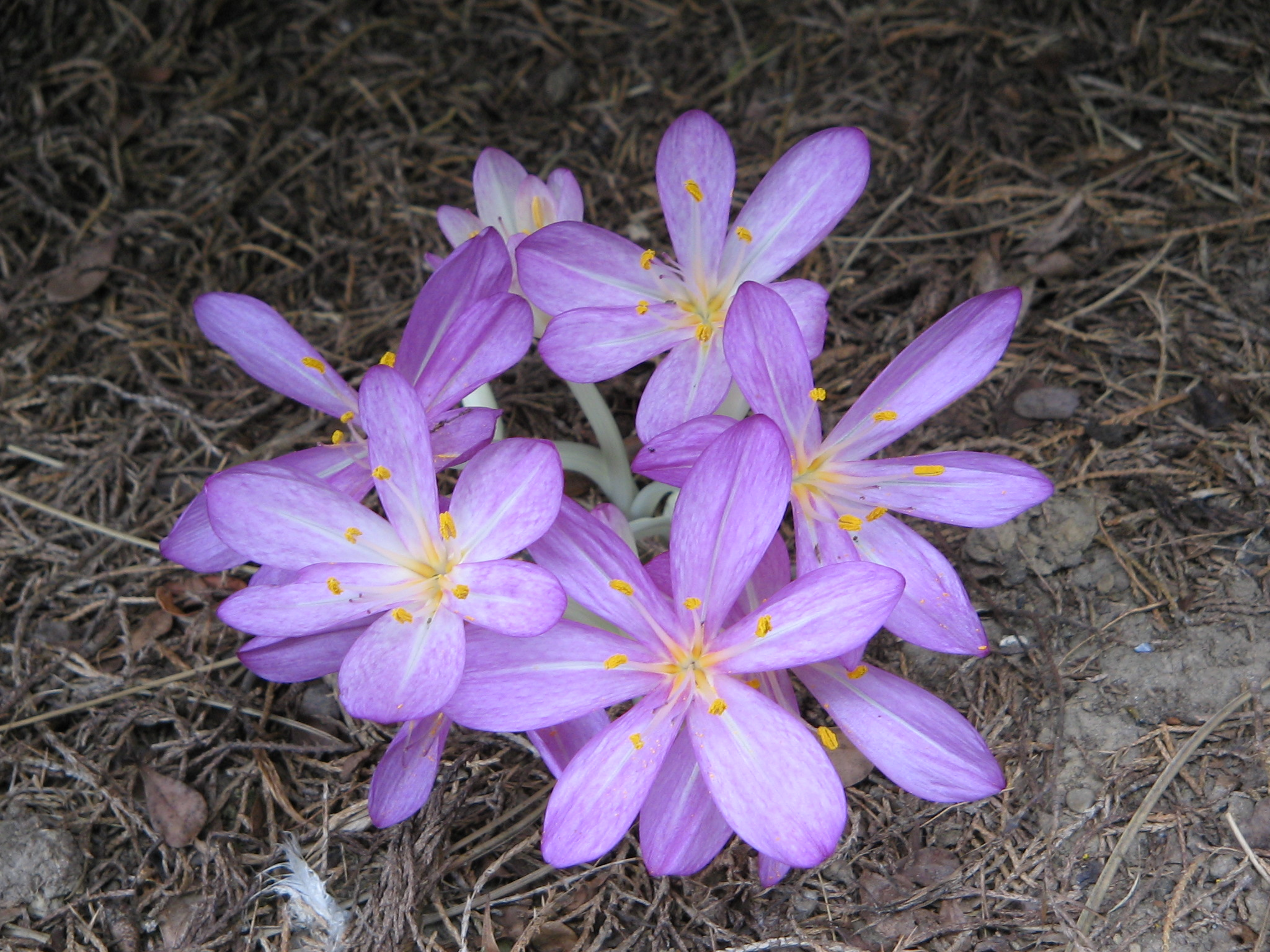

Scientific classification
- Kingdom: Plantae
- Clade: Tracheophytes
- Clade: Angiosperms
- Clade: Monocots
- Order: Liliales
- Family: Colchicaceae
- Genus: Colchicum
- Species: C. cilicicum

Binomial name
- Colchicum cilicicum (Boiss.) Dammer

Synonyms
- Colchicum × byzantinum var. cilicicum Boiss.; Colchicum bivonae Ten.; Colchicum tenorei Parl.; Colchicum tenorii orth. var.; Colchicum bisignanii Ten. ex Janka; Colchicum autumnale var. tenorei (Parl.) Fiori; Colchicum autumnale var. todaroi (Parl.) Fiori; Colchicum todaroi Parl.

= Colchicum cilicicum =

Species of flowering plant

Colchicum cilicicum, the Tenore autumn crocus, is a species of flowering plant in the family Colchicaceae. A bulbous perennial, it bears deep rose-lilac flowers in late summer, with barely any chequered pattern on the petals (tessellation). It has a very noticeable white stripe down the centre of each petal, which gives it a star-like appearance at the base. The flowers tend to stand up to weather better than other colchicum blooms. The flowers appear before the strap-like leaves, giving this and other colchicum species the common name "naked lady". Although colchicums are called "autumn crocuses" they belong to a different family than true crocuses. There are in fact autumn-flowering species of crocus such as Crocus sativus, which is the source of the spice saffron. Colchicum cilicicum, by contrast, is toxic if eaten.

This species is native to Turkey and Syria.

It is found in cultivation, and under its synonym C. tenorei has gained the Royal Horticultural Society's Award of Garden Merit. (confirmed 2017). The cultivar 'Purpureum' is also a recipient of the award.
