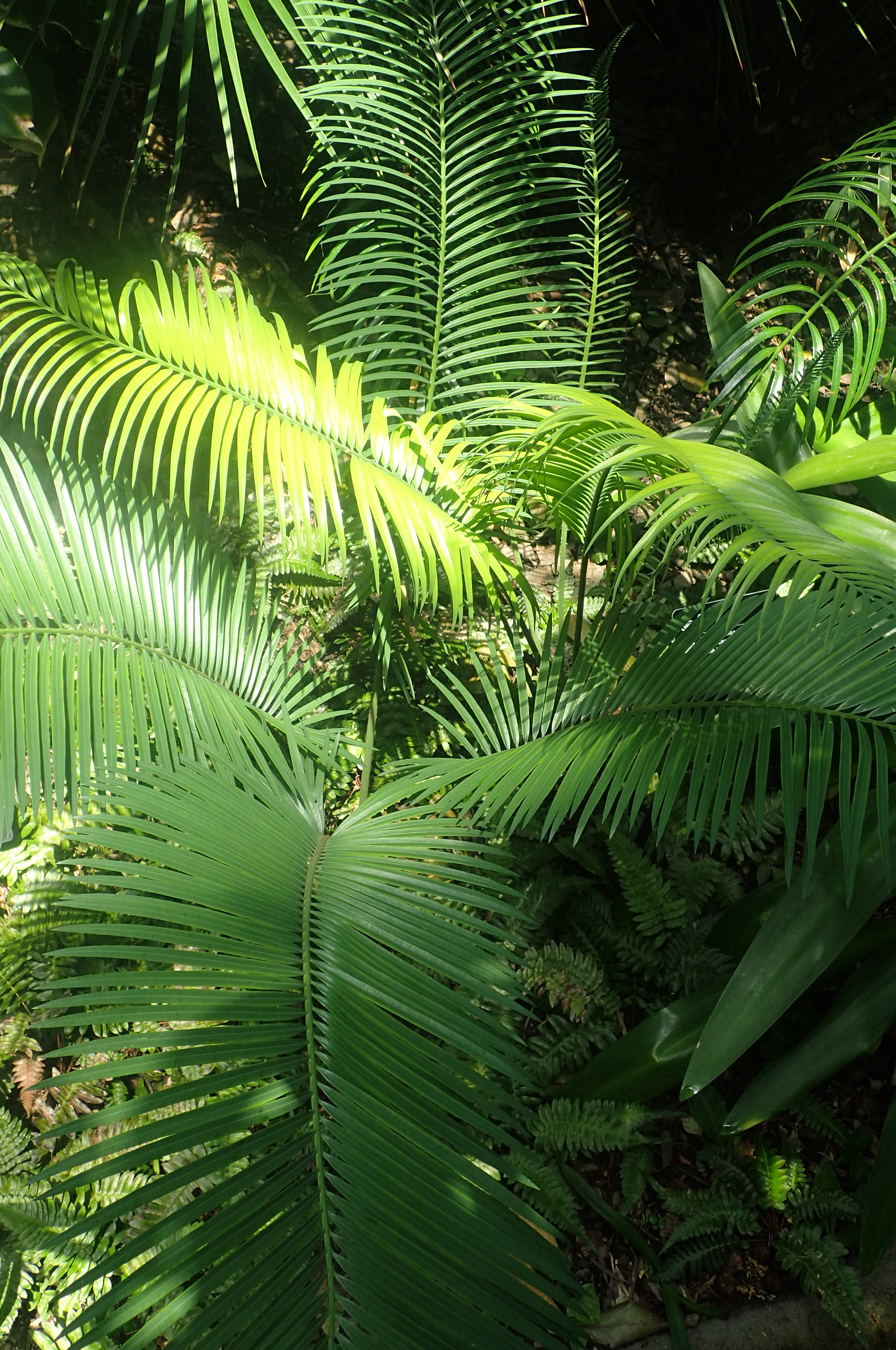

Conservation status
- Endangered (IUCN 3.1)

Scientific classification
- Kingdom: Plantae
- Clade: Embryophytes
- Clade: Tracheophytes
- Clade: Gymnosperms
- Division: Cycadophyta
- Class: Cycadopsida
- Order: Cycadales
- Family: Cycadaceae
- Genus: Cycas
- Species: C. balansae

Binomial name
- Cycas balansae Warb.

= Cycas balansae =

Species of cycad

Cycas balansae is a species of cycad in the genus Cycas, native to southwestern China (southeast Guangxi) and adjacent northern Vietnam (near Hanoi), where it occurs in dense mountain rainforests.

It has a subterranean, unbranched stem 12–20 cm in diameter, bearing 4-9 leaves, each leaf 1.2-2.6 m long, pinnate with 90-160 leaflets, and armed with spines along the petiole. The leaflets are papery in texture, and angled forward at 80 degrees.

The female cones are closed type, 8–12 cm long sporophylls with 2-4 ovules. Lateral spines present in lamina, apical spines not distinct, with yellow sarcotesta. The male cones are yellow, solitary, erect, 20–25 cm long and 4–7 cm diameter, with wedge shaped sporophylls.

== Range ==
In northeastern Vietnam, Cycas balansae is found in Lang Son, Vinh Phuc, Thai Nguyen, and Quang Ninh provinces. In Guangxi, China, it is found in the Shiwan Dashan (mountains). In Yunnan, China, it is found in Jingping, Maguan, and Pingbian counties.

== Cultivation ==
It is cultivated as a pot plant in its native range, but is not seen with any frequency outside of this area.

It is named after the French botanist Benedict Balansa.
