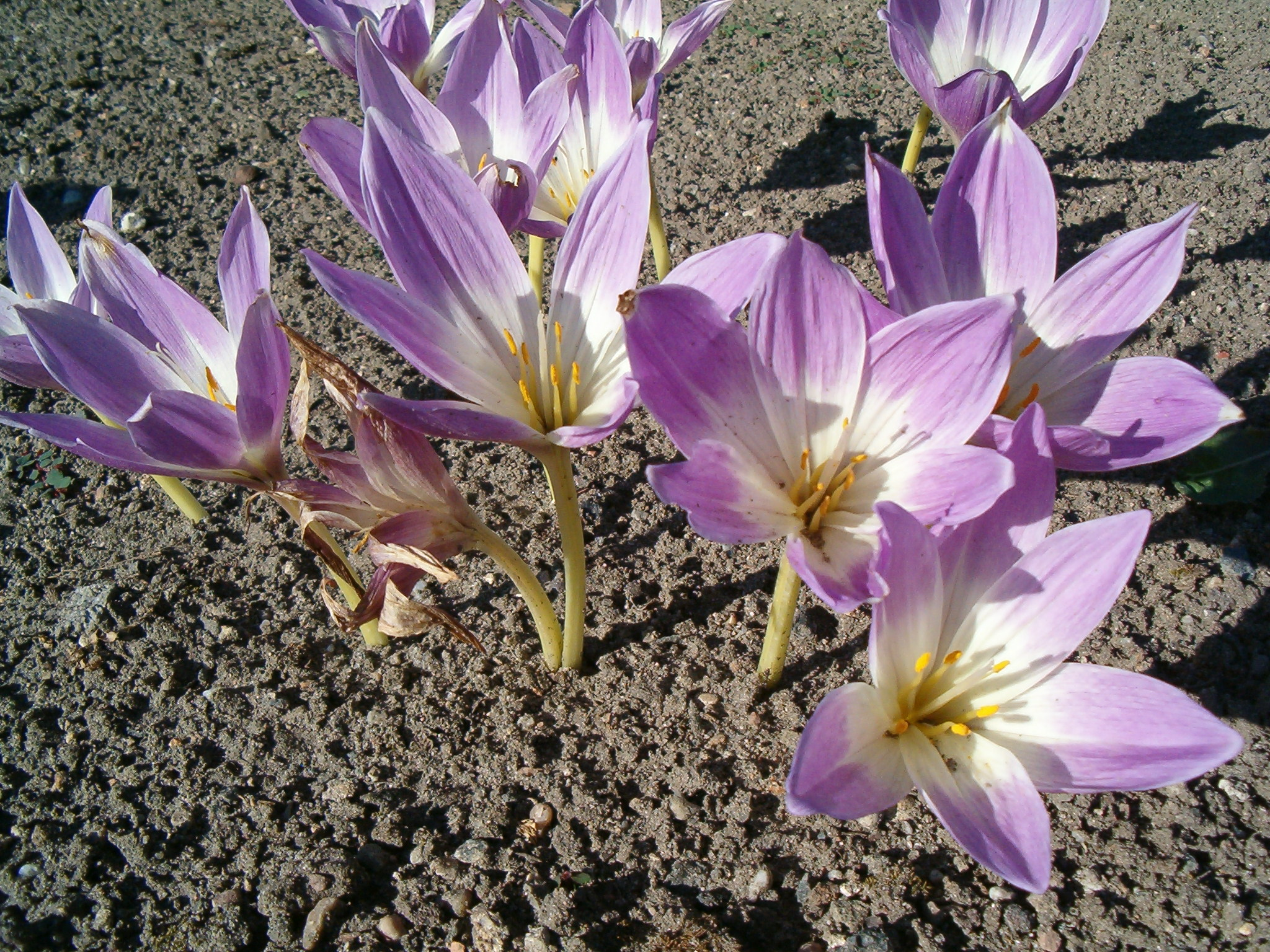

Scientific classification
- Kingdom: Plantae
- Clade: Tracheophytes
- Clade: Angiosperms
- Clade: Monocots
- Order: Liliales
- Family: Colchicaceae
- Genus: Colchicum
- Species: C. speciosum

Binomial name
- Colchicum speciosum Steven

Synonyms
- Colchicum latifolium Griseb.; Colchicum bornmuelleri Freyn; Colchicum speciosum var. lenkoranicum Miscz.; Colchicum giganteum S.Arn.; Colchicum hyrcanicum Woronow; Colchicum lenkoranicum (Miscz.) Grossh.

= Colchicum speciosum =

Species of flowering plant

Colchicum speciosum is a species of flowering plant in the family Colchicaceae, native to mountainous areas of northern Turkey, the Caucasus and northern Iran. Growing to 18 cm (7 in) tall by 10 cm (4 in) wide, it is an herbaceous perennial growing from corms. C. speciosum blooms in the fall, producing reddish/violet flowers on stems up to 30 centimetres (12 in) tall without any leaves present. The strap-like leaves grow in the spring, then yellow, wither and die back as summer progresses. The flowers strongly resemble those of the crocus, the familiar spring-flowering bulb; hence the common name autumn crocus which is applied to this and other colchicum species. However the two genera belong to different families; and there is in fact an autumn-flowering crocus species, Crocus sativus, the source of the spice saffron. By contrast, all parts of Colchicum speciosum are toxic if ingested.

== Cultivation ==
Colchicum speciosum is a vigorous grower and does well in full sun to partial shade and well-drained soils in most climates. It is valued in gardens for its late flowering at the end of summer and into autumn.

Cultivars include the white 'Album' and the amethyst-purple ‘Atrorubens’ which have gained the Royal Horticultural Society's Award of Garden Merit (confirmed 2017).

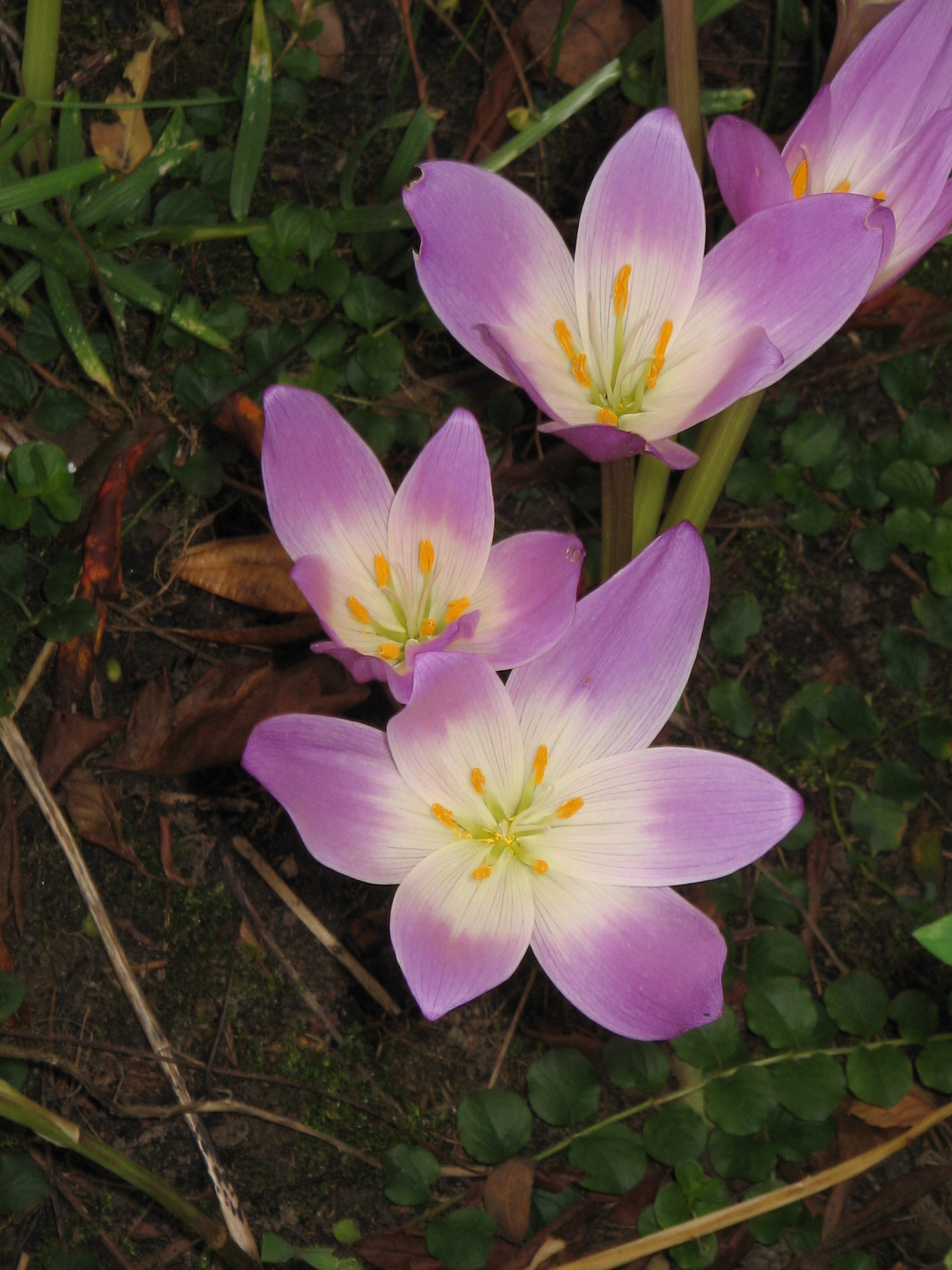
C. speciosum close-up

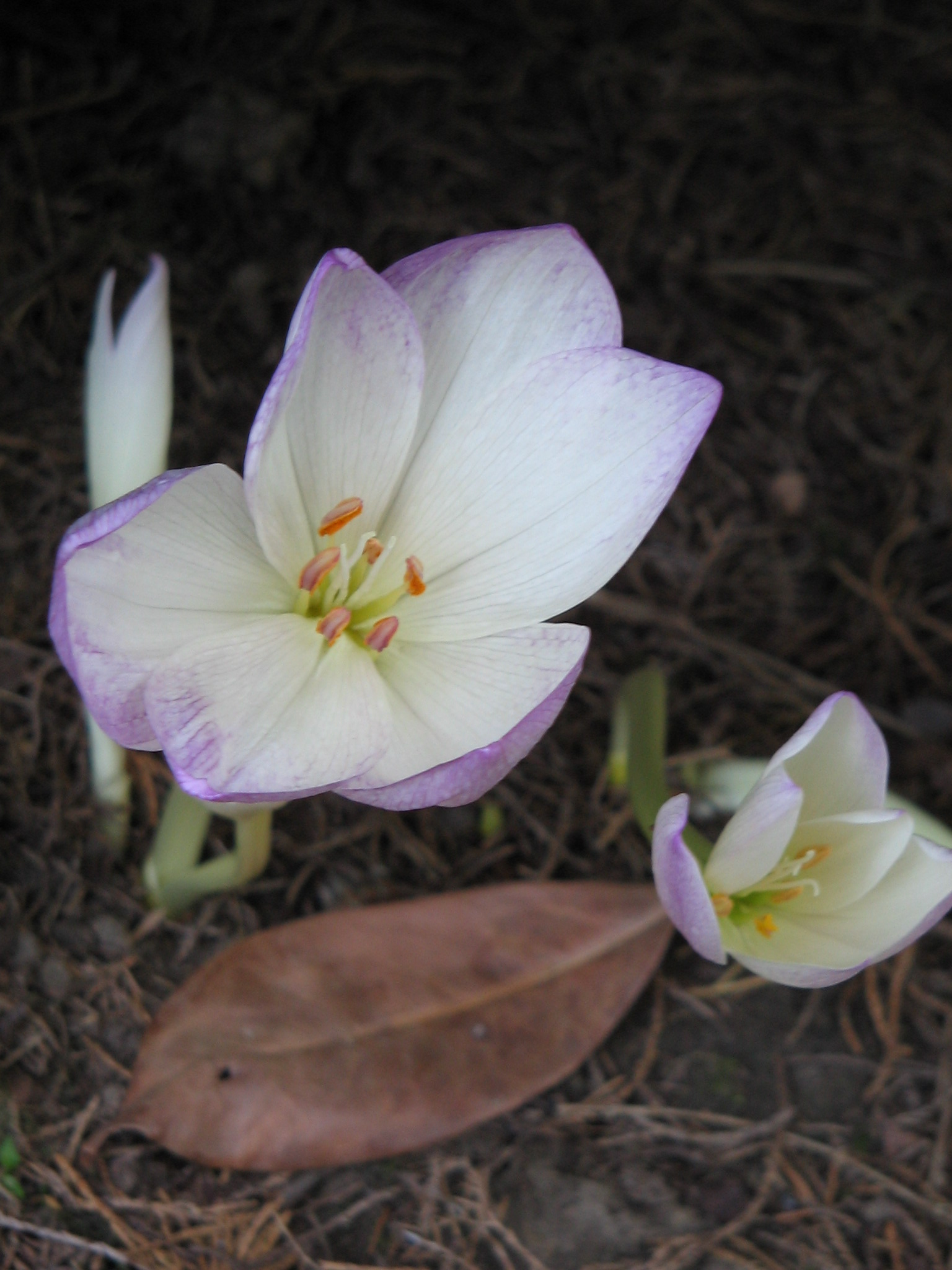
C. speciosum var. bornmuelleri close-up

C. speciosum var. bornmuelleri styles and stamens

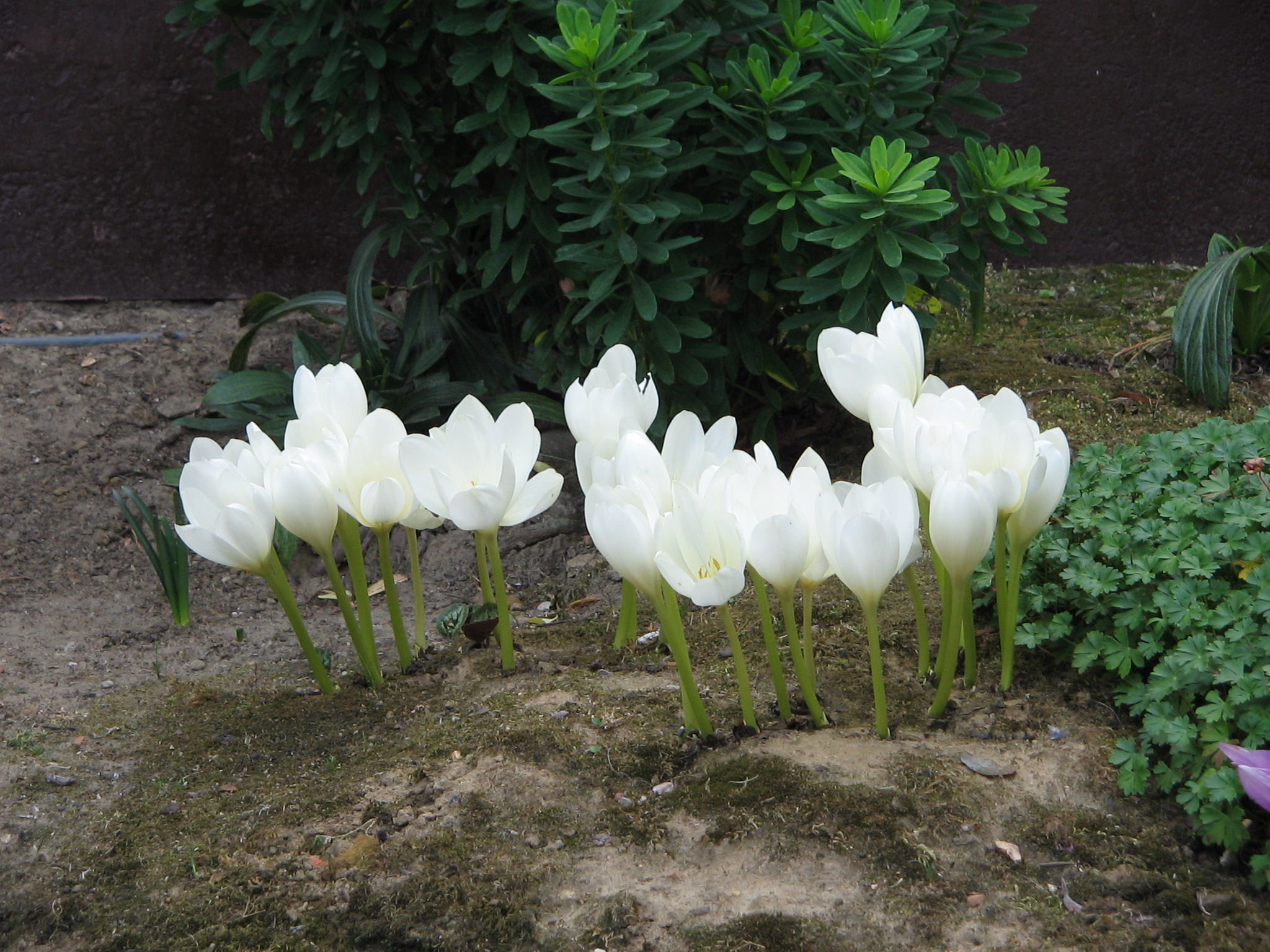
C. speciosum 'Album' clump

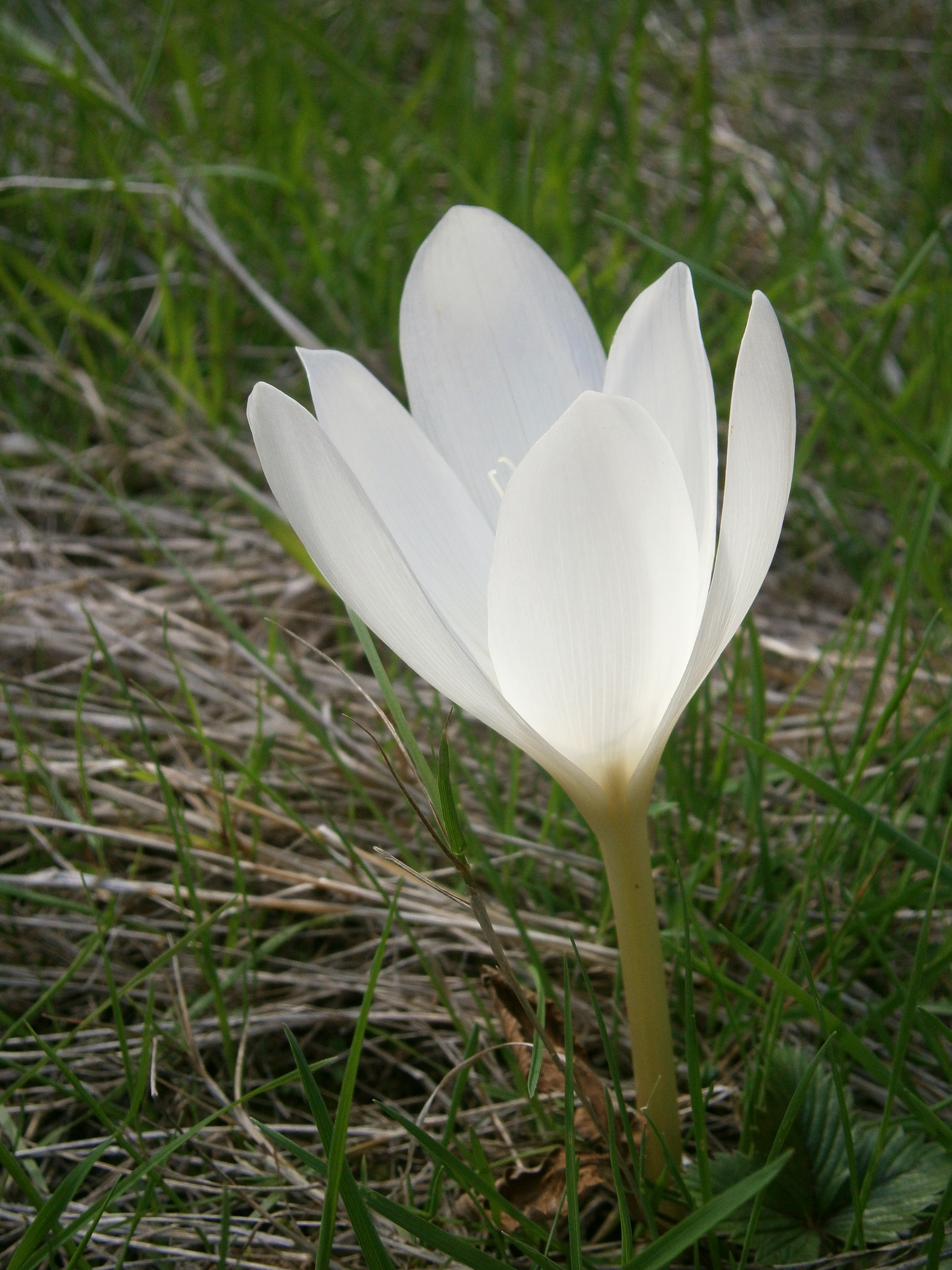
C. speciosum 'Album' close-up
