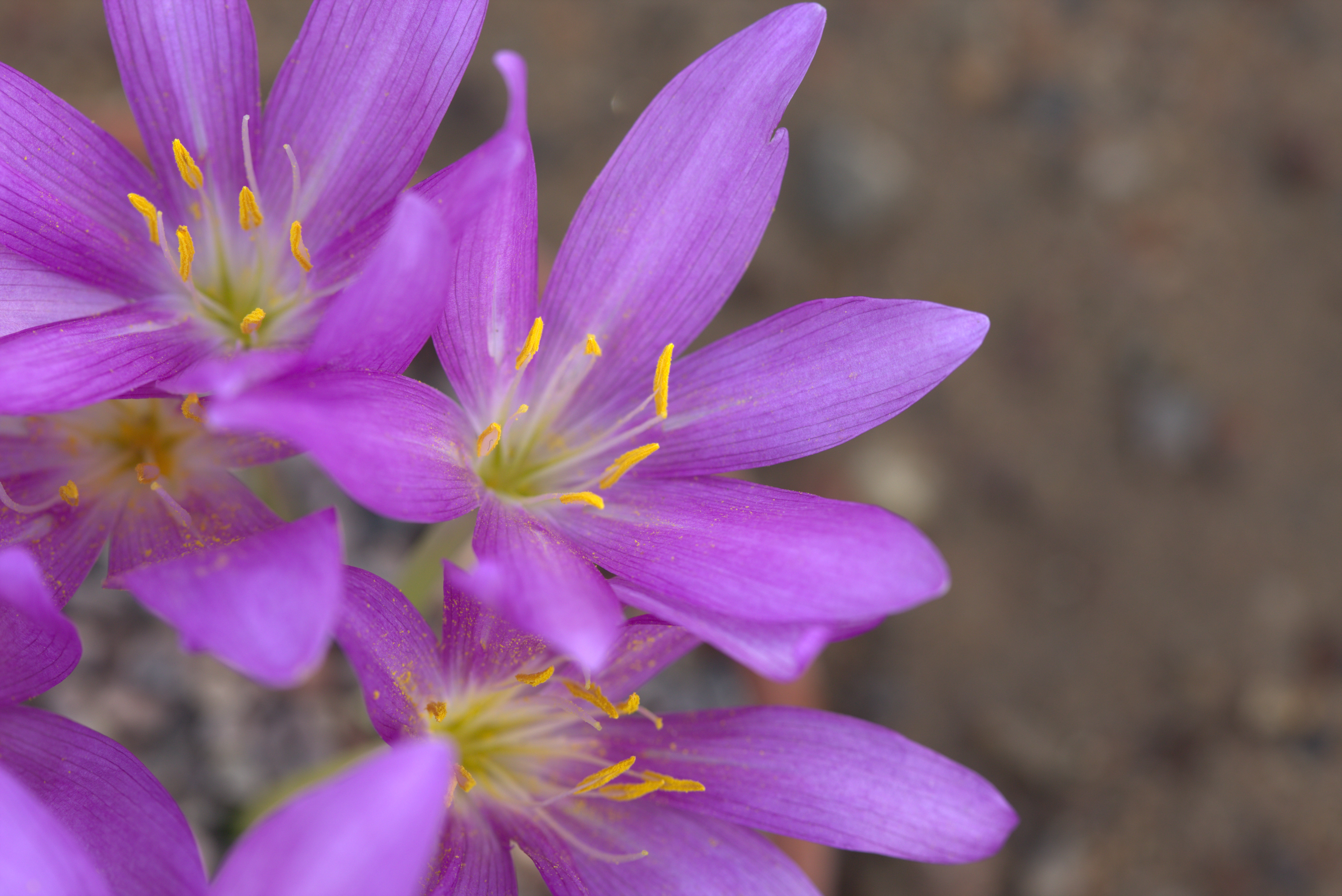

Scientific classification
- Kingdom: Plantae
- Clade: Tracheophytes
- Clade: Angiosperms
- Clade: Monocots
- Order: Liliales
- Family: Colchicaceae
- Genus: Colchicum
- Species: C. boissieri

Binomial name
- Colchicum boissieri Orph.

Synonyms
- Colchicum pinatziorum Rech.f.; Colchicum procurrens Baker

= Colchicum boissieri =

Species of flowering plant

Colchicum boisseri is a plant species in the genus Colchicum (the autumn crocuses) native to southern Greece and south-western Turkey but cultivated elsewhere as an ornamental. The species is unique for its spreading, rhizomatous bulbs. It blooms well with 5 cm (2") blooms in a bright cherry pink. The stamens are yellow. The flowers have no tessellations, only a white line down the centre of each petal. It is named after botanist Pierre Edmond Boissier.
