= Saffron (color) =

Color that is a tone of golden yellow

Color coordinates
- Hex triplet: #F4C430
- sRGB^{B} (r, g, b): (244, 196, 48)
- HSV (h, s, v): (45°, 80%, 96%)
- CIELCh_{uv} (L, C, h): (81, 90, 63°)
- Source: Maerz and Paul
- ISCC–NBS descriptor: Vivid yellow
- B: Normalized to [0–255] (byte)

Rajah

Color coordinates
- Hex triplet: #FBAB60
- sRGB^{B} (r, g, b): (251, 171, 96)
- HSV (h, s, v): (29°, 62%, 98%)
- CIELCh_{uv} (L, C, h): (76, 83, 42°)
- ISCC–NBS descriptor: Moderate orange
- B: Normalized to [0–255] (byte)

Deep saffron (Bhagwa)

Colour coordinates
- Hex triplet: #FF9933
- sRGB^{B} (r, g, b): (255, 153, 51)
- HSV (h, s, v): (30°, 80%, 100%)
- CIELCh_{uv} (L, C, h): (72, 105, 37°)
- ISCC–NBS descriptor: Strong orange
- B: Normalized to [0–255] (byte)

India saffron (Kesari/Kesariya)

Colour coordinates
- Hex triplet: #FF7722
- sRGB^{B} (r, g, b): (255, 119, 34)
- HSV (h, s, v): (23°, 87%, 100%)
- CIELCh_{uv} (L, C, h): (65, 125, 26°)
- Source: Vexillological:
- ISCC–NBS descriptor: Saffronish orange
- B: Normalized to [0–255] (byte)

Myanmar saffron

Colour coordinates
- Hex triplet: #FECB00
- sRGB^{B} (r, g, b): (254, 203, 0)
- HSV (h, s, v): (48°, 100%, 100%)
- CIELCh_{uv} (L, C, h): (84, 98, 63°)
- Source: Vexillological:
- ISCC–NBS descriptor: Saffronish yellow
- B: Normalized to [0–255] (byte)

Saffron Yellow (RAL)

Color coordinates
- Hex triplet: #F5D033
- sRGB^{B} (r, g, b): (245, 208, 51)
- HSV (h, s, v): (49°, 79%, 96%)
- CIELCh_{uv} (L, C, h): (84, 90, 69°)
- Source: RAL Color Chart
- B: Normalized to [0–255] (byte)

Saffron is a shade of yellow or orange, the colour of the tip of the saffron crocus thread, from which the spice saffron is derived. The hue of the spice saffron is primarily due to the carotenoid chemical crocin.

== Etymology ==
The word saffron ultimately derives (via Arabic) from the Middle Iranian ja'far-. The name was used for the saffron spice in Middle English from c. 1200. As a colour name, it dates to the late 14th century.

Deep saffron approximates the colour of India saffron (also known as bhagwa or kesari).

In Rajasthani, this colour is called kesariya. The word derives its name from kesar, the Hindustani name for saffron, an important crop in Kashmir. In Kashmir it is popularly known as Kong posh.

== Religion ==
The color Saffron (Hindi: भगवा, romanized: Bhagwā) is considered a sacred color in Hinduism. According to Hindu belief, Saffron (or Kesariya) is the color of Sunset (Sandhya) and Fire (Agni) which symbolises sacrifice, light, and quest of salvation. The color is worn by Hindu saints and ascetics as their devotion toward the religion. Many Hindu kingdoms and dynasties had Saffron color in their flag denoting the Sanātana Dharma, including the Maratha Empire.

Hinduism, Jainism and Buddhism associate saffron with the pious renunciation of material life.

Buddhist monks in the Theravada tradition typically wear saffron robes (although occasionally maroon — the color normally worn by Vajrayana Buddhist monks — is worn). The tone of saffron typically worn by Theravada Buddhist monks is the lighter tone of saffron shown above.

Saffron holds symbolic meaning in Sikhism, representing spirit and sacrifice. Originally a shade of yellow called basanti, the field of the modern Nishan Sahib is saffron. Turbans worn by Sikhs most often are blue or white, but basanti colour is common.

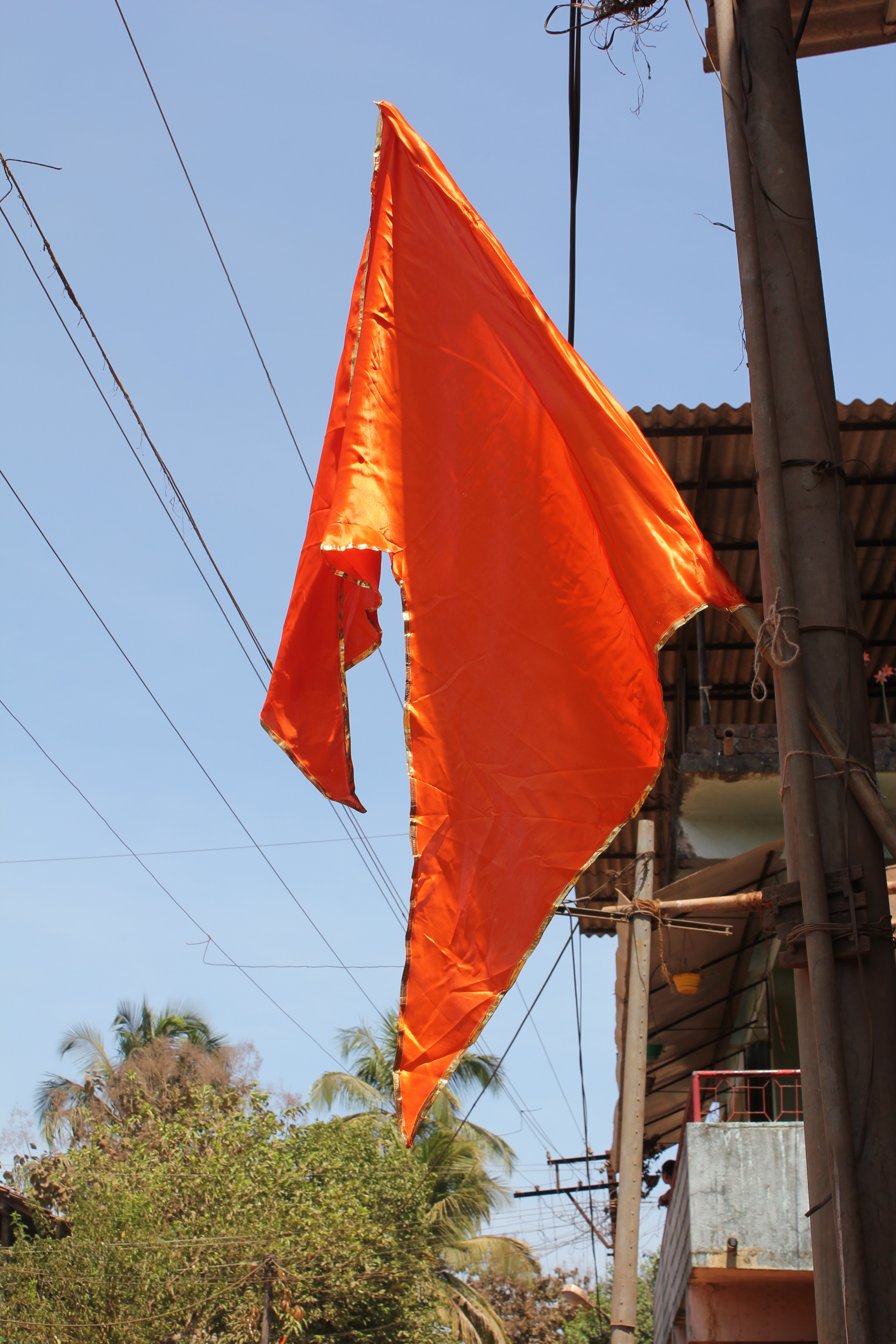
Bhagwa colour flag, used by Hindus

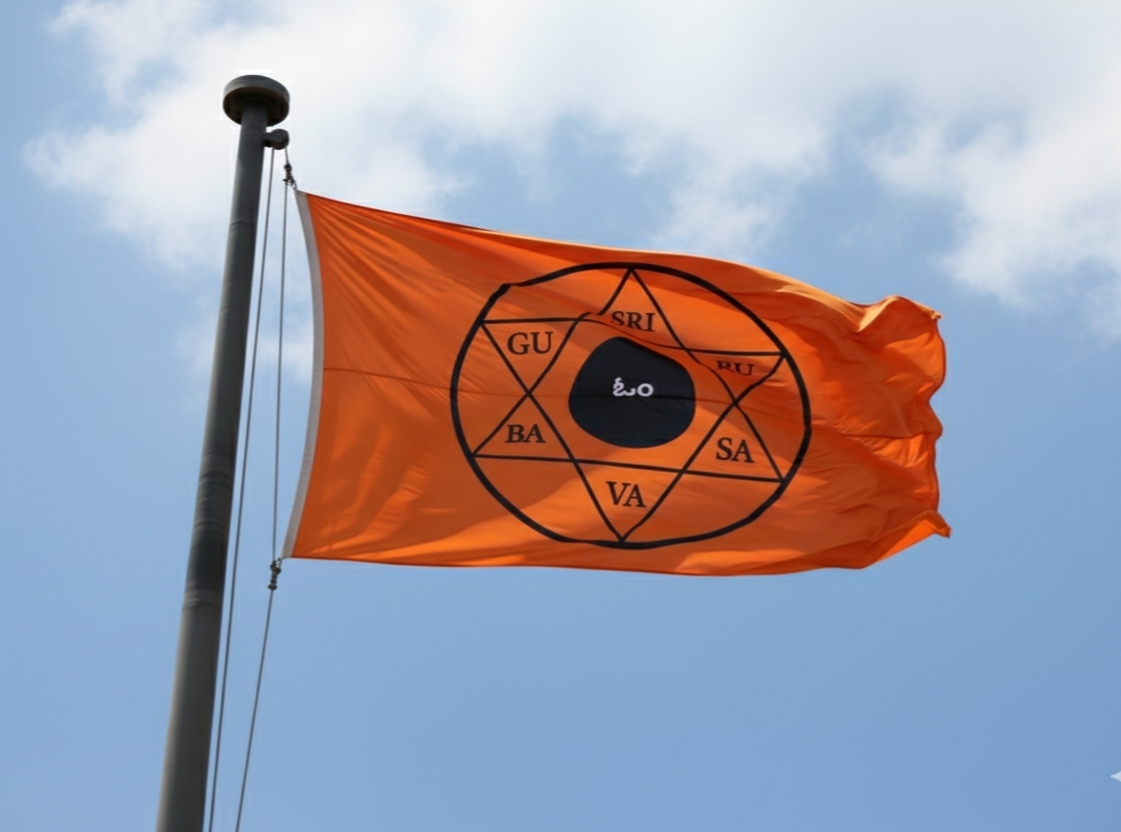
Shatasthala Flag used by Lingayats

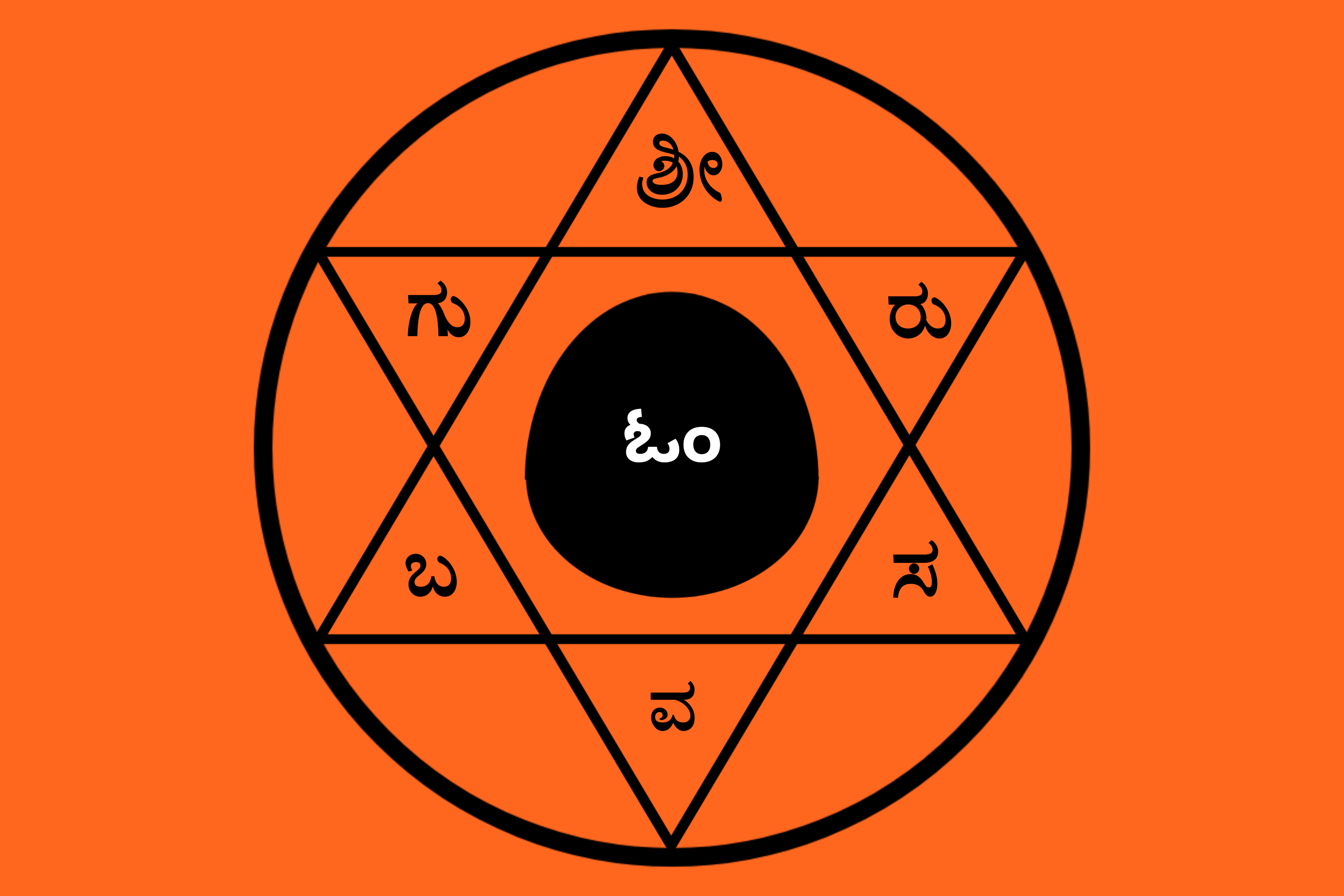
Shatasthala Flag of Lingayats

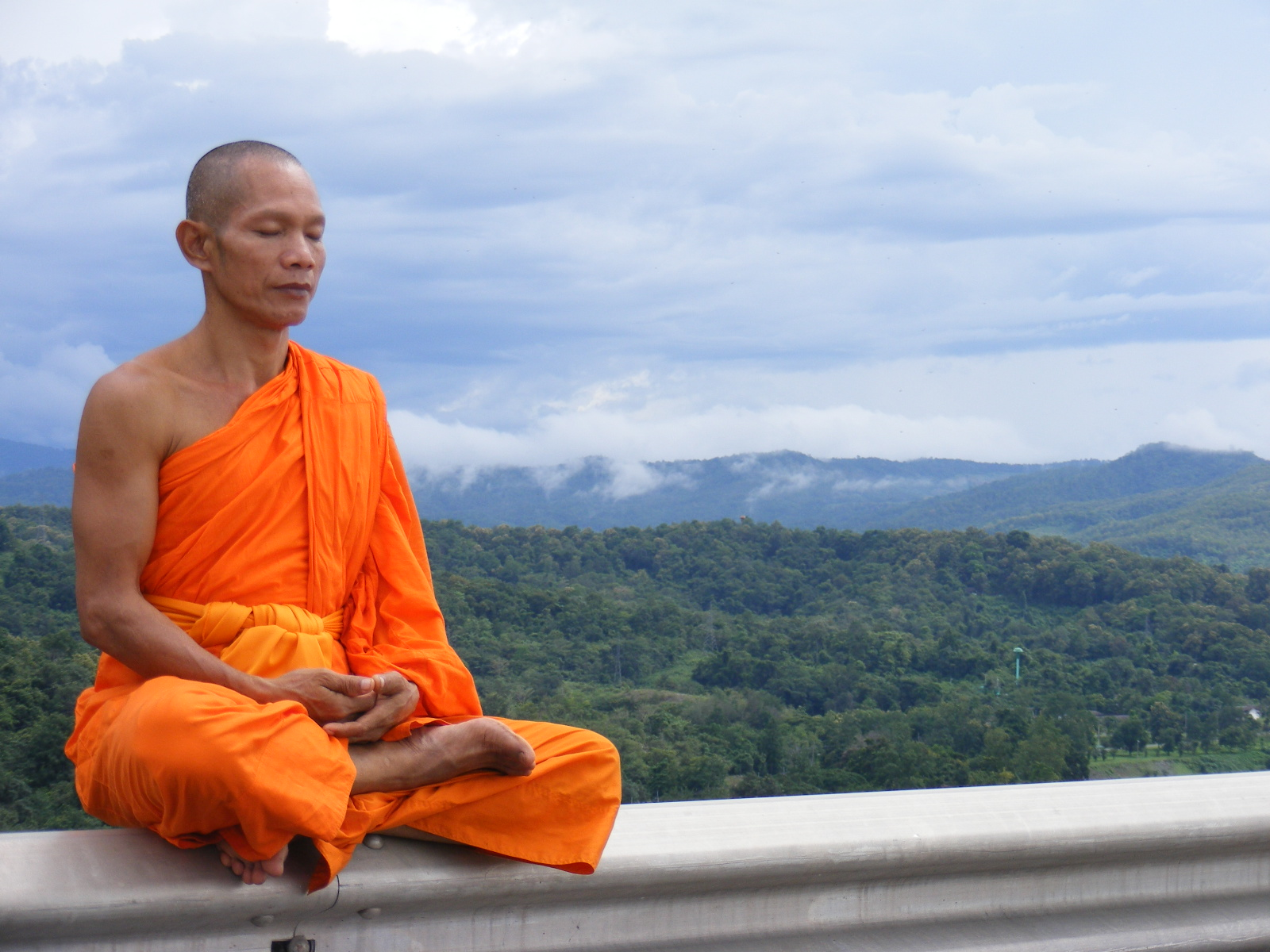
Theravada monk in Thailand

Flag of the Sikh religion, the Nishan Sahib.

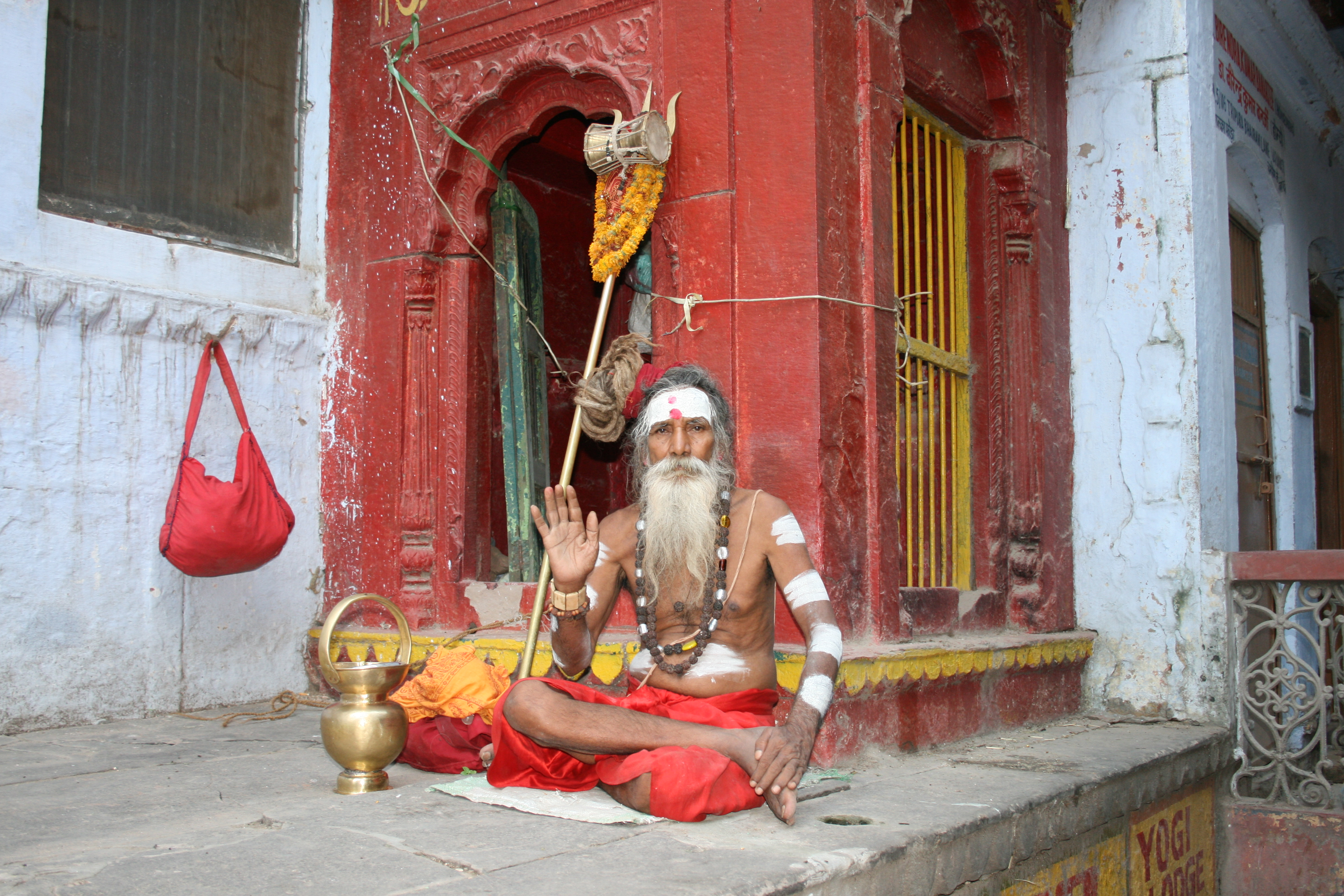
Hindu ascetic

== Political and religious uses ==
The flag of India (since 1947) is saffron, white, and green

Bhagwa Dhwaj, the flag of the Maratha Empire

In politics, it was used by the Indian independence movement, and it was chosen as one of the three colours of the Indian national flag after independence in 1947, and is used by Hindus. India saffron, representing courage and sacrifice, was chosen for one of the three bands of the National Flag of India, along with white (peace and truth) and what is now called India green (faith and chivalry). The Flag of India is officially described in the Flag Code of India as follows:

The colour of the top panel shall be India saffron (Kesari) and that of the bottom panel shall be India green. The middle panel shall be white, bearing at its centre the design of Ashoka Chakra in navy blue colour with 24 equally spaced spokes.

Sarvepalli Radhakrishnan, who later became India's first Vice President and second President, described the significance of the Indian National Flag as follows:

Bhagwa or the saffron colour denotes renunciation or disinterestedness. Our leaders must be indifferent to material gains and dedicate themselves to their work. The white in the centre is light, the path of truth to guide our conduct. The green shows our relation to (the) soil, our relation to the plant life here, on which all other life depends. The "Ashoka Chakra" in the centre of the white is the wheel of the law of dharma. Truth or satya, dharma or virtue ought to be the controlling principle of those who work under this flag. Again, the wheel denotes motion. There is death in stagnation. There is life in movement. India should no more resist change, it must move and go forward. The wheel represents the dynamism of a peaceful change.

The use of saffron in the national flag and as political symbolism has been opposed. One line of opposition asserts that the color is sacred and should not be politicized. Another source of opposition comes from Islamists who claim the color is forbidden in Islam and strongly prohibited to be worn by the males.

Because Therevada Buddhist monks were at the forefront of the 2007 Burmese anti-government protests, the uprising has been referred to as the Saffron Revolution by some in the international media.

=== Hindutva (Hindu-ness) ===
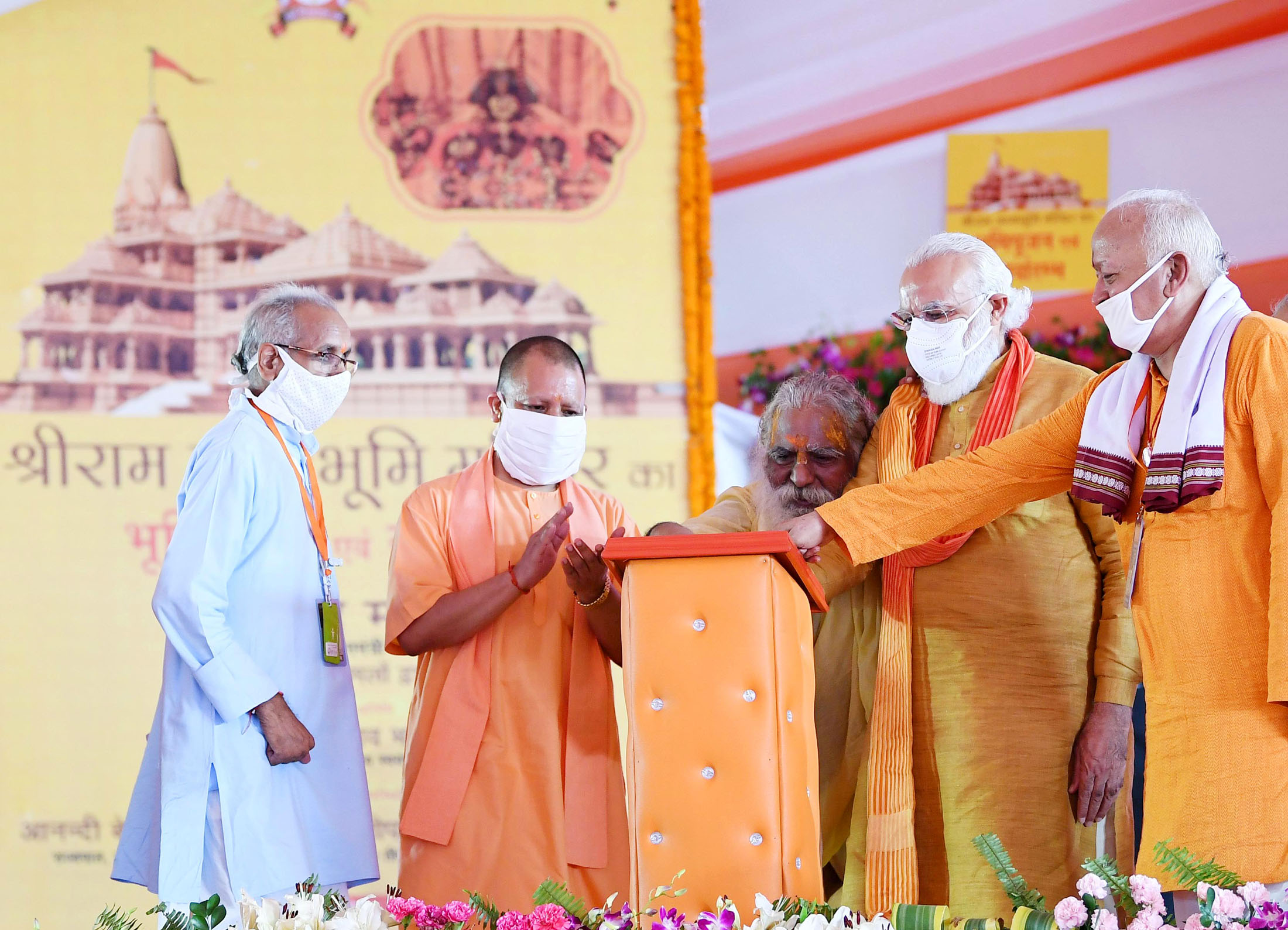
Uttar Pradesh chief minister Yogi Adityanath, Indian prime minister Narendra Modi and the RSS chief Mohan Bhagwat in saffron robes

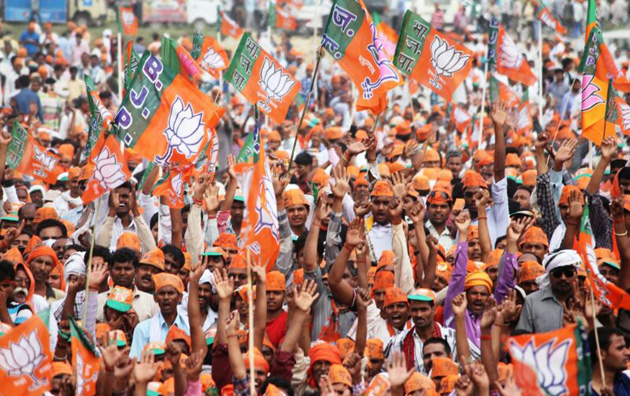
Saffron flags in an election rally of the Bharatiya Janata Party

The saffron flag (bhagwa dhwaj) of the medieval Hindu warrior Shivaji was held in high esteem by far-right Hindutva organisations such as the Hindu Mahasabha and Rashtriya Swayamsevak Sangh (RSS) in the 1920s as a supposed representation of Hindu resurgence and militaristic tradition. The saffron flag was the "true guru" to which Hedgewar demanded obeisance from the RSS members. "The Gerva [saffron] Flag shall be the flag of the Hindu nation. With its Om, the Swastik and the Sword, it appeals to the sentiments cherished by our race since the Vaidik [Vedic] days," he said.

The Bharatiya Jana Sangh and its successor Bharatiya Janata Party (BJP) both used saffron as their colour. The BJP used a saffron lotus on its flag, along with a green side band that possibly reflected an attempted image of accommodation with Islam. The Vishva Hindu Parishad (VHP), a Hindutva organisation affiliated with the RSS, also used saffron as its predominant colour, with its ascetic leaders clad in saffron robes and lay leaders wearing saffron scarves. During the Ram Rath Yatra movement in 1990, the VHP and its affiliate Bajrang Dal distributed saffron flags and saffron headbands to their followers by the millions.

The predominance of the saffron symbolism in the BJP and its allies led to the BJP being referred to as the 'saffron party' in the 1990s, and the term 'saffronisation' came to be used to describe the increasing influence of Hindutva across India. This period saw phrases such as the "saffronisation of the coastal belt", "saffronisation of Karnataka" and "saffronisation of the Congress(I)". Academic and non-academic scholars wrote books with titles involving 'saffron' to refer to Hindu nationalism, such as the Brotherhood in Saffron, Khaki Shorts and Saffron Flags, and The Saffron Wave.

== Clothing ==
Saffron-coloured cloth had a history of use among the Gaelic-Irish. A saffron kilt is worn by the pipers of certain Irish regiments in the British Army, and the saffron léine in the defence forces of the Republic of Ireland. The latter garment is also worn by some Irish and Irish-American men as an item of national costume (though most wear kilts, believing them to be Irish). Its colour varies from a true saffron orange to a range of dull mustard and yellowish-brown hues.

The Antrim GAA teams are nicknamed "The Saffrons" because of the saffron-coloured kit which they play in. The Old Irish word for saffron, cróc, derives directly from the Latin Crocus sativus. In Ireland between the 14th and 17th centuries, men wore léinte (singular léine), loose saffron-coloured shirts that reached down to mid-thigh or the knee. (see Irish clothing).

== Literature ==
The colour saffron is associated with the goddess of dawn (Eos in Greek mythology and Aurora in Roman mythology) in classical literature:

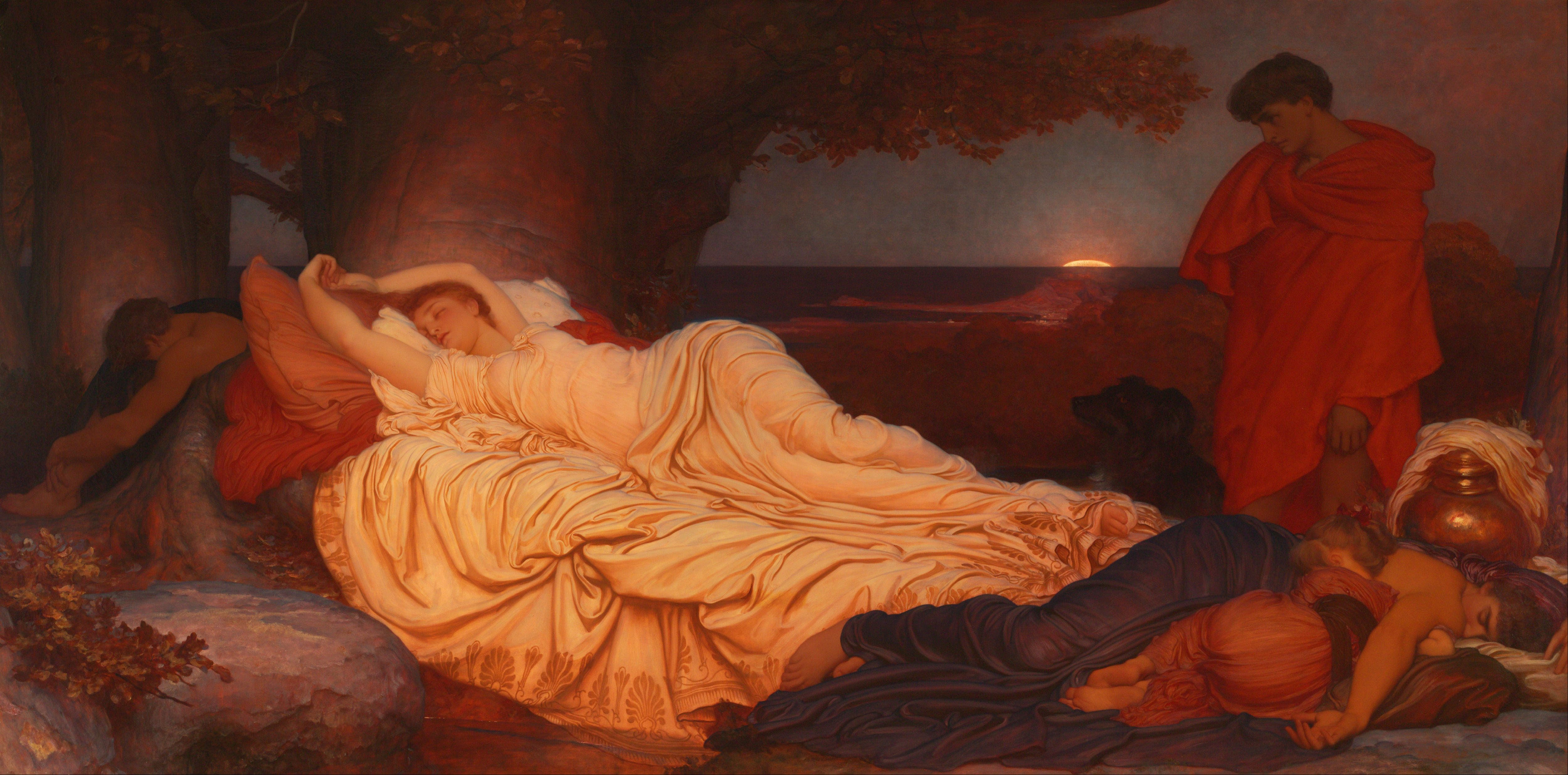
Cymon and Iphigeneia c. 1884 by Frederic Leighton - saffron suffuses the canvas at sunrise

Homer's Iliad:

Now when Dawn in robe of saffron was hastening from the streams of Okeanos, to bring light to mortals and immortals, Thetis reached the ships with the armor that the god had given her. (19.1)

Virgil's Aeneid:

Aurora now had left her saffron bed,

And beams of early light the heav'ns o'erspread,

When, from a tow'r, the queen, with wakeful eyes,

Saw day point upward from the rosy skies.

== Other media ==
- The lyrics of Donovan's 1966 song, "Mellow Yellow" repeat the line, "I'm just mad about Saffron".
- In the Pokémon franchise, in the region of Kanto there is a city named Saffron City. It is one of the largest cities in the region, and home to the headquarters of the major tech corporation Silph Co. and the region's Psychic-type Gym.
- The Gates is a site-specific art installation by Christo and Jeanne-Claude. The artists installed 7,503 metal "gates" along 23 miles (37 km) of pathways in Central Park in New York City. From each gate hung a flag-shaped piece of deep saffron-coloured nylon fabric. The exhibit ran from February 12, 2005, through February 27, 2005.
- Saffron Monsoon is a character in Absolutely Fabulous.

== In nature ==
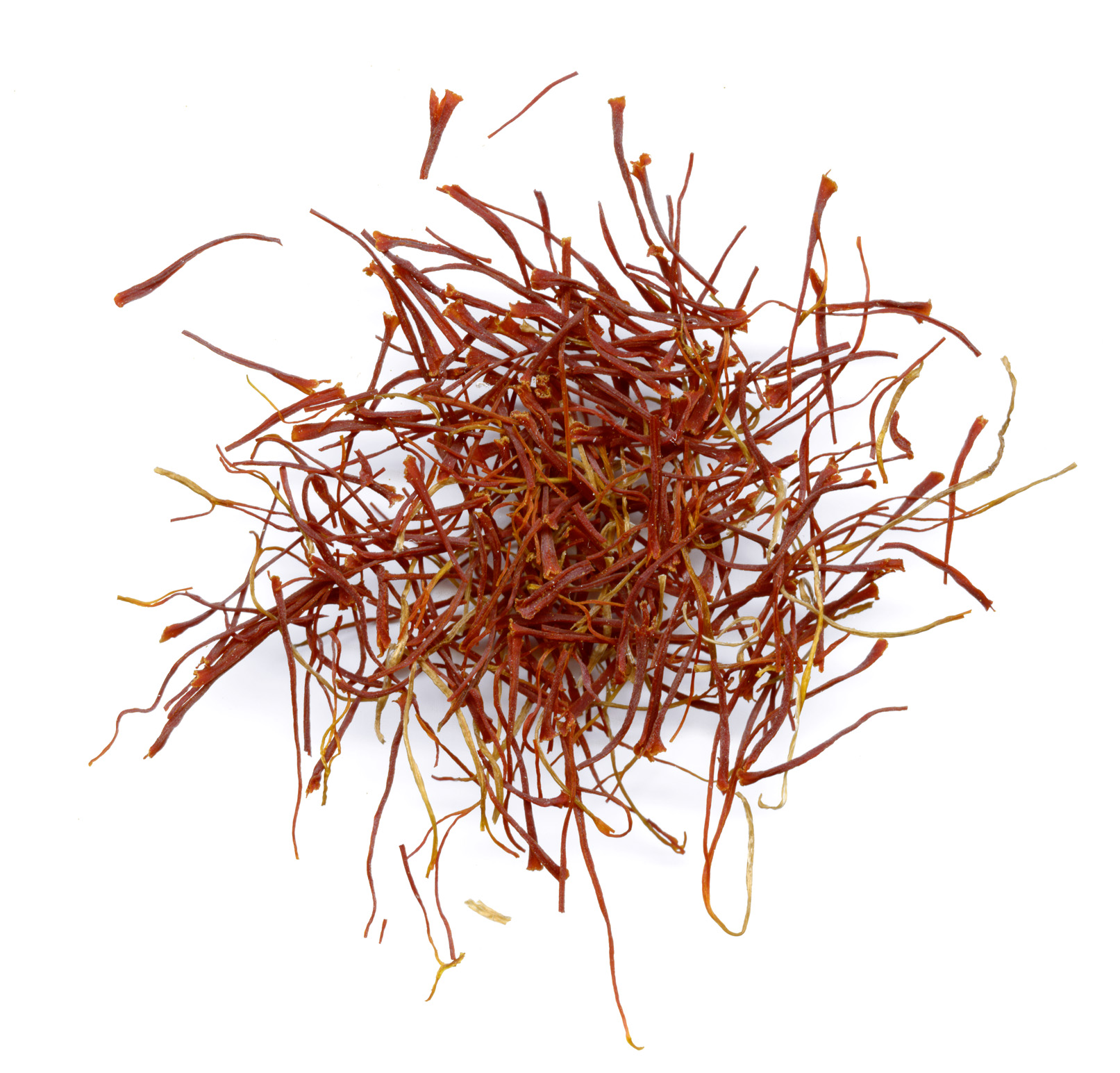
Saffron threads from Iran

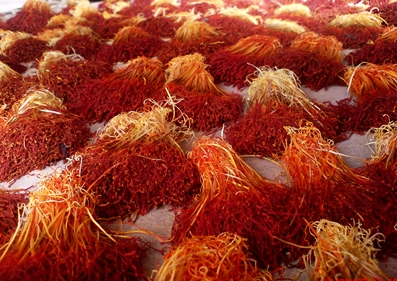
Stigmas (i.e., flower threads) from saffron crocus are plucked, piled, and dried.

Plants

- Byzantine meadow saffron (Colchicum × byzantinum) is a hybrid flowering plant.
- Cape saffron (Cassine peragua) is a flowering tree with saffron-coloured bark.
- Cobra saffron (Mesua ferrea) is a tree found in southern Asia.
- Meadow saffron (Colchicum autumnale) is a flowering plant found in Europe.
- Mediterranean meadow saffron (Colchicum cupanii) is a flowering plant found in central Mediterranean basin.
- Saffron buckwheat (Eriogonum crocatum) is a species of wild buckwheat endemic to the Conejo Valley.
- Saffron spice is derived from the flowers of the plant named saffron crocus (Crocus sativus).
- Saffron plum (Sideroxylon celastrinum) is a flowering plant found in North, Central, and South America.
- Saffron thistle (Carthamus lanatus) is a thistle native to the Mediterranean basin.
- Spring meadow saffron (Colchicum bulbocodium) is a flowering alpine plant found in Europe.
- Steven's meadow saffron (Colchicum stevenii) is a flowering plant found in the eastern Mediterranean.

Birds

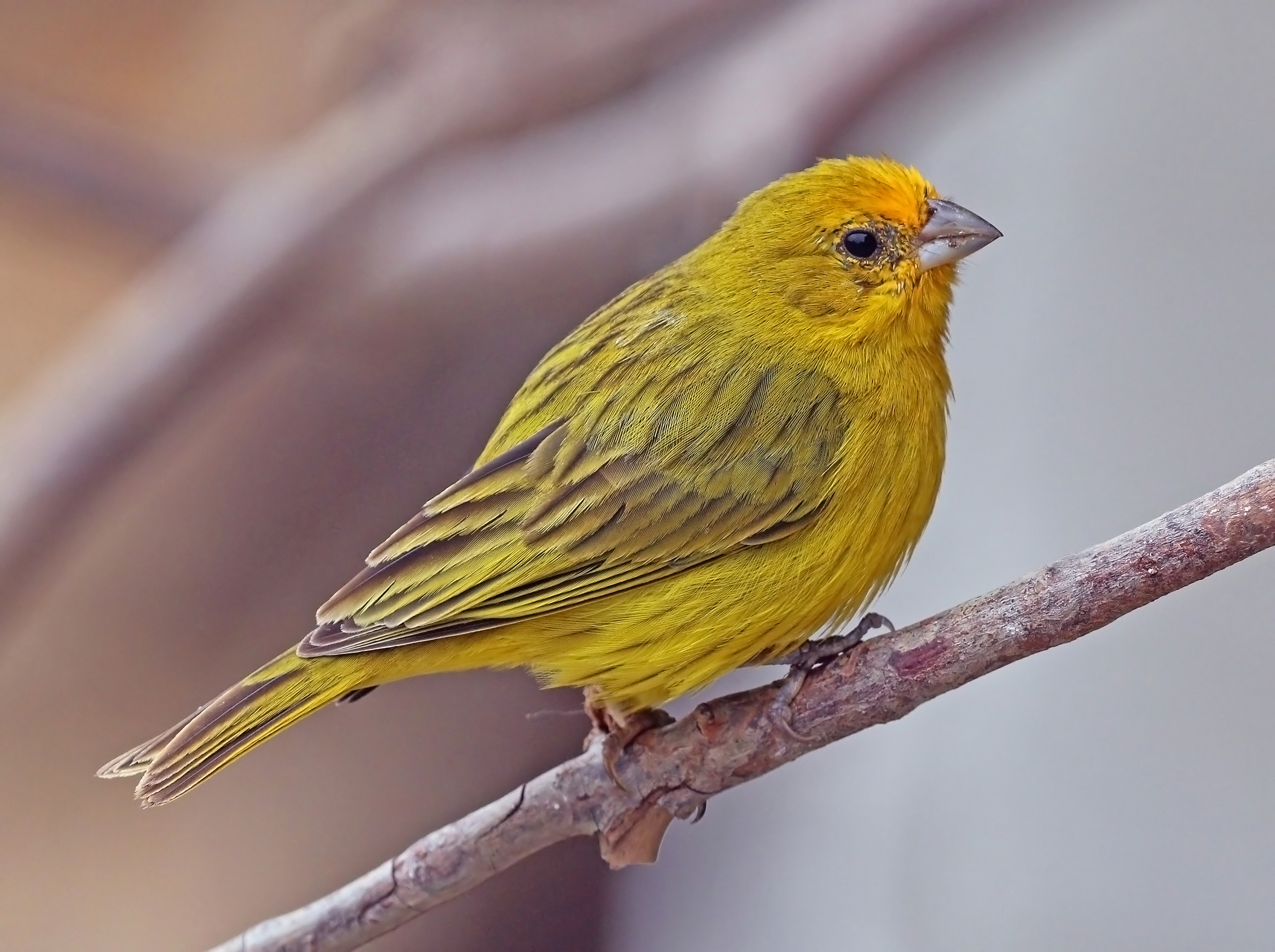
A male saffron finch (Sicalis flaveola)

- The saffron-billed sparrow (Arremon flavirostris) is a bird found in South America.
- The saffron-breasted prinia (Prinia hypoxantha) is a passerine bird found in eastern South Africa and Swaziland.
- The saffron-crested tyrant-manakin (Neopelma chrysocephalum) is a bird found in the Guianas, southern Venezuela, and the northwestern Amazon basin.
- The saffron-crowned tanager (Tangara xanthocephala) is a bird found in the montane forests of South America.
- The saffron-headed parrot (Pyrilia pyrilia) is a parrot found in the montane forests of South America.
- The saffron finch (Sicalis flaveola) is a tanager from South America, and is common in both open and semi-open areas in lowlands outside the Amazon basin.
- The saffron siskin (Spinus siemiradzkii) is a finch found in Ecuador and Peru.
- The saffron toucanet (Pteroglossus bailloni) is a toucan from South American's Atlantic Forest.

Aquatic animals

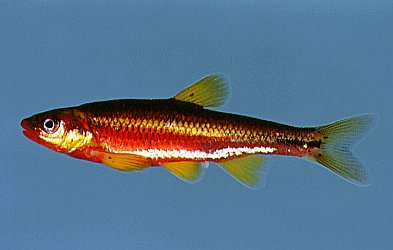
A male saffron shiner (Notropis rubricroceus)

- The saffron cod (Eleginus gracilis) is a commercially harvested fish in the North Pacific.
- The saffron-coloured clam (Tridacna crocea) is a bivalve found in the Indo-Pacific region.
- The saffron shiner (Notropis rubricroceus) is a fish found in Tennessee River drainage.

Amphibians

- The saffron-bellied frog (Chaperina fusca) is a frog found in the Malay Peninsula, Borneo, and the Philippines.

Insects

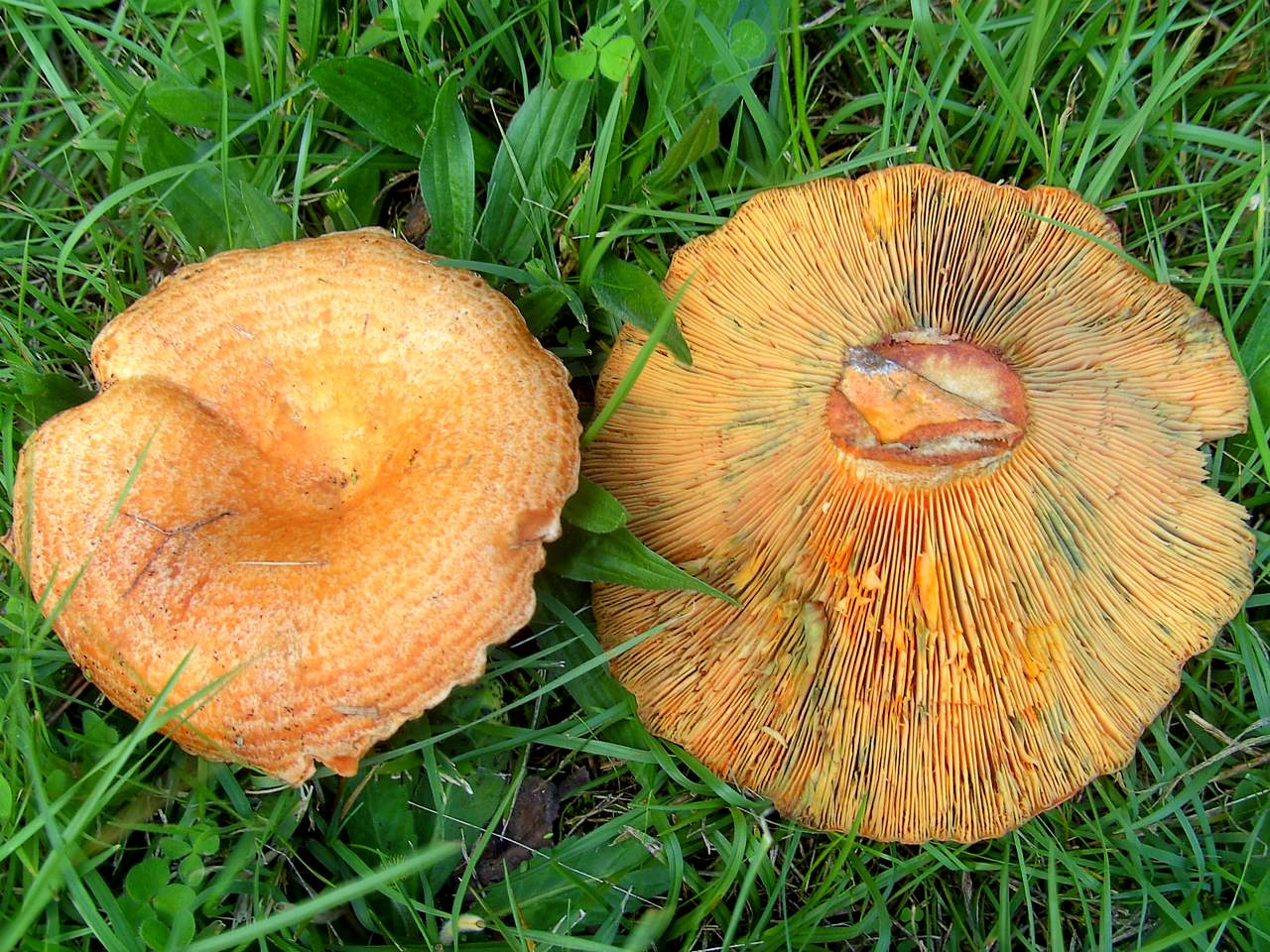
A saffron milkcap (Lactarius deliciosus)

- The saffron-winged meadowhawk (Sympetrum costiferum) is a dragonfly found in North America.
- The saffron beetle (Calosoma schayeri) is a beetle found in Australia.
- The saffron sapphire (Iolaus pallene) is a butterfly found in Africa.
- The saffron skipper (Poanes aaroni) is a skipper found in North America.

Fungi

- False saffron milkcap (Lactarius deterrimus) is a fungus found in Europe and Asia.
- Saffron milk cap (Lactarius deliciosus) is an edible fungus found in Europe.
- Saffron ringless amanita (Amanita crocea) is a Amantia found in Europe.

Viruses

- The Saffron Scourge is another name for yellow fever.

== See also ==
- Saffron, spice of the saffron crocus
- History of saffron
- RAL 1017 Saffron yellow
- List of colours
- Saffron Type System, an anti-aliased text-rendering engine
