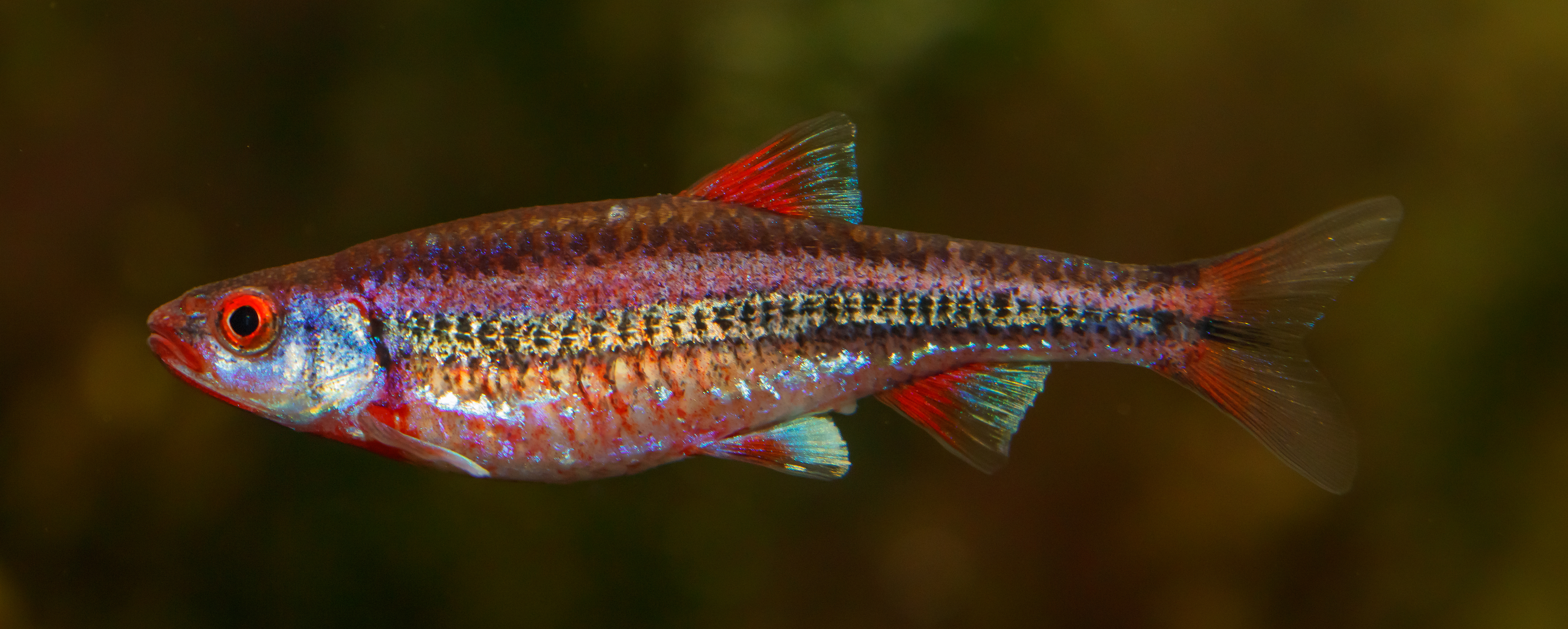

Conservation status
- Least Concern (IUCN 3.1)

Scientific classification
- Kingdom: Animalia
- Phylum: Chordata
- Class: Actinopterygii
- Division: Teleostei
- Order: Cypriniformes
- Family: Leuciscidae
- Subfamily: Pogonichthyinae
- Genus: Hydrophlox
- Species: H. chrosomus

Binomial name
- Hydrophlox chrosomus (D. S. Jordan, 1877)

Synonyms
- Hybopsis chrosomus D. S. Jordan, 1877; Notropis chrosomus (D. S. Jordan, 1877)

= Rainbow shiner =

Species of fish

The rainbow shiner (Hydrophlox chrosomus) is a species of freshwater ray-finned fishes belonging to the family Leuciscidae, the shiners, daces and minnows. This fish is found in North America.

The rainbow shiner has a length of 5 to 8 centimetres (2.0 to 3.1 in). It has translucent color from pink to golden with a silver-black stripe along its flanks. The base of its fins are of a reddish color. Adult males change their color during the mating period. Their ventral fins become blue, their head turns purple and their nose turns red.

The rainbow shiner was originally endemic to the Mobile River system, where it can be found in small clear rivers of drainage areas of the Alabama, Coosa and Black Warrior rivers in particular. Now it also appears in some rivers in Tennessee and is a popular pet fish for aquariums and ponds.

The rainbow shiner spawns between May and June.

== Introduction ==
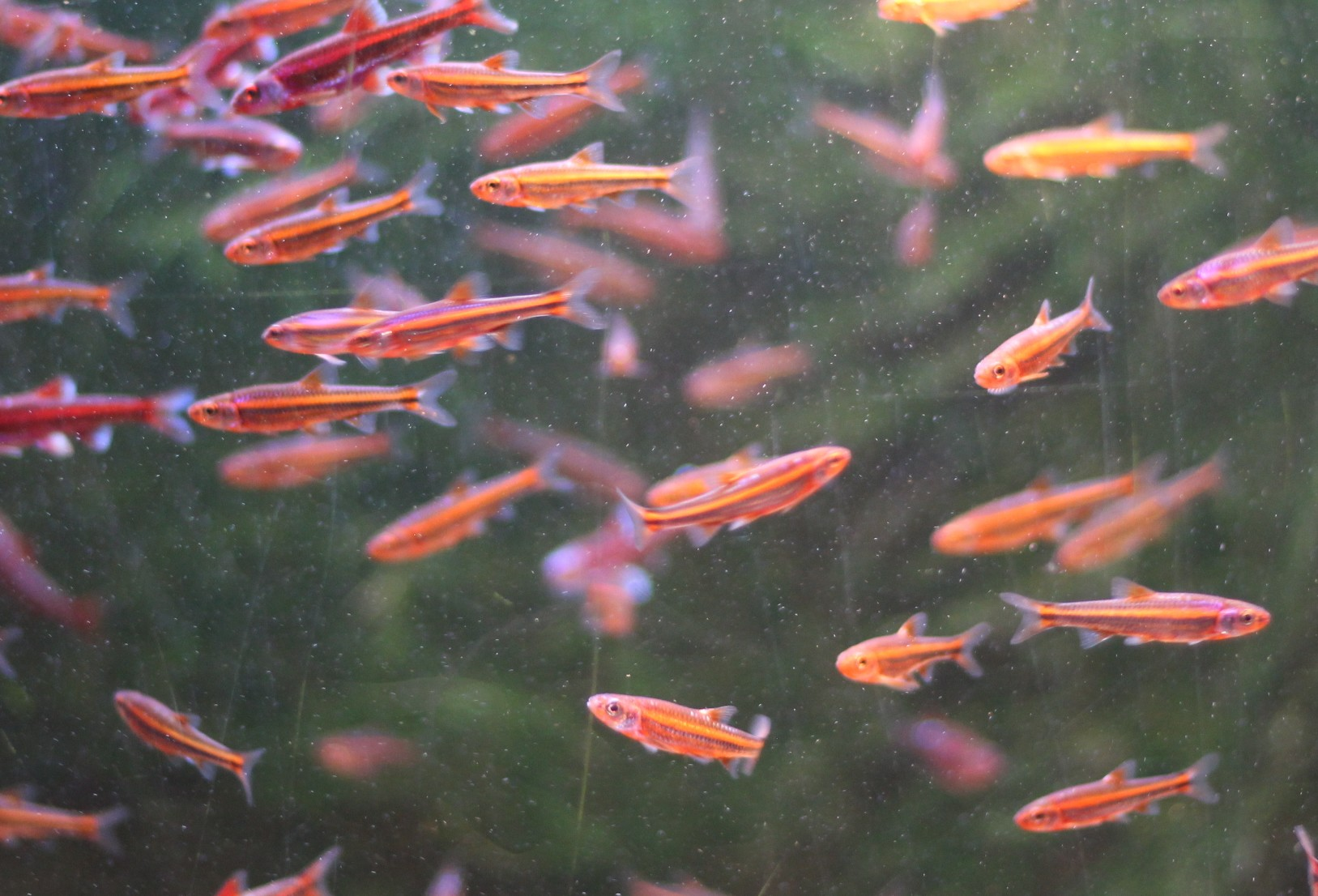
Rainbow shiners

This species of fish is usually found in small streams along river drainages of Northwest Georgia, Northeastern Alabama, and as more recent research suggests, southwest Tennessee. H. chrosomus is a freshwater, benthopelagic fish that inhabits riffles and pools with gravelly bottoms in creeks and small rivers and are usually found accompanied by species of Campostoma. They are mainly insectivorous and although studies show the predominant prey of H. chrosomus come from the family Chironomidae, they are found to be more opportunistic feeders and are not very selective. The maximum age is typically two years for both sexes and sexual maturity occurs at one year of age. H. chrosomus increase their food intake during the late winter and spring months before spawning in order to meet the increased energy needs for gamete production and sexual reproduction. Hybridization has been observed between Alburnops baileyi and H. chrosomus in areas where H. chiliticus populations have been introduced. There is limited information available pertaining to the current and past management of H. chrosomus. What is known, is that this species was once endemic to parts of northern Alabama and populations have spread further north to Tennessee within recent decades. The latitudinal movement northward may be of particular interest to researchers since H. chrosomus favors warmer waters.

== Geographic distribution ==
The native range of the rainbow shiner consists of the Mobile Bay basin, including the Coosa, Cahaba, and Alabama River drainages. This species is known from, and was possibly introduced into the Black Warrior River system. These reports however, have been questioned recently based on the fact that this species is typically found in streams with limestone outcrops in the watershed. H. chrosomus is found along the southeast edge of the Black Warrior River system consisting of streams that have headwaters in limestone formations. H. chrosomus is also known from, and may have been introduced into, tributaries of the Tennessee River, including Town Creek in northern Alabama and the South Chickamauga Creek system in north Georgia. The means of their introduction is unknown but it is hypothesized that it was by bait bucket release.

== Ecology ==
Hydrophlox chrosomus is typically found in small, low-turbidity headwater streams flowing over gravelly and sandy riffles and pools but can also be found in springs and small, clear streams. H. chrosomus inhabit freshwater benthopelagic habitats in temperate waters. It is typical that rainbow shiners co-occur with Fundulus stellifer (also considered to have been introduced by recent accidental bait bucket introductions) in small streams. H. chrosomus are considered opportunistic insectivores. Over 80% of food items preyed on are invertebrates, the bulk of which are aquatic and terrestrial insects. Studies show gut contents largely consisting largely of Chironomidae larvae, unidentified insect parts, unidentified Diptera adults, and Collembola.

Hydrophlox chrosomus is considered a disturbance sensitive species, however, their percent occurrence in the Upper Cahaba River (an area recently plagued with urban construction and habitat disturbance) has nearly doubled. Populations increased from 6.5% in 1983 to 12.5% in 1995 as opposed to other disturbance-sensitive species also found in the Upper Cahaba River such as Cyprinella callistia, Etheostoma jordani, and Percina brevicauda whose populations significantly decreased within the same time span.

== Life history ==
In a study of a wild population in Moore Creek in northern Georgia, rainbow shiners reached sexual maturity at approximately one year of age. The oldest individuals examined were approximately two years old, with maximum estimated ages of 23 months for males and 25 months for females. Growth in both length and weight increases during spring with adults reaching 1.6 to 2.4 inches (41 to 61 mm) in length. Spawning occurs in 16–25 °C (61–77 °F) waters in late spring/early summer. Rainbow shiners are nest-associating minnows that spawn in nests constructed by other species. Spawning aggregations have been observed over pit nests of largescale stonerollers (Campostoma oligolepis) and gravel-mound nests of bluehead chubs (Nocomis leptocephalus). Rainbow shiners increase food intake during late winter and early spring, coinciding with increased growth before the spawning season and preceding the increased energy requirements of gamete production and courtship behaviors.

== Current management ==
Currently, H. chrosomus is a species of relatively low conservation concern and does not require significant additional protection or management, monitoring or research action. However, a detailed recovery plan for the Mobile River Basin aquatic ecosystem, to which H. chrosomus is native, is underway. The plan was created by the U. S. Fish and Wildlife Service and aims to protect the Basin's native aquatic fauna and flora through aquatic ecosystem management. The decline of many other aquatic species within the Basin is a result of increasing human populations, modifications to meet their needs, and impacts of current land use. Human populations and their associated needs for housing, recreation, and agricultural products is projected to increase within the Basin. The recovery plan therefore seeks to emphasize stewardship responsibilities shared by all inhabitants of the Basin by promoting three basic tenets:

1. Use to the fullest practical extent existing laws, regulations, and policies to protect listed populations and to develop a stream management strategy that places high priority on conservation and restoration.
2. Encourage voluntary stewardship through joint initiatives and individual actions as the only practical and economical means of minimizing adverse effects of private land use and activities within watersheds.
3. Continue to promote research efforts on life histories, sensitivities, and requirements of imperiled aquatic species, and develop technological capabilities to maintain and propagate them.

By seeking to improve habitat conditions within the Basin, it is likely that populations of H. chrosomus will continue to remain stable or increase with these improvements.
