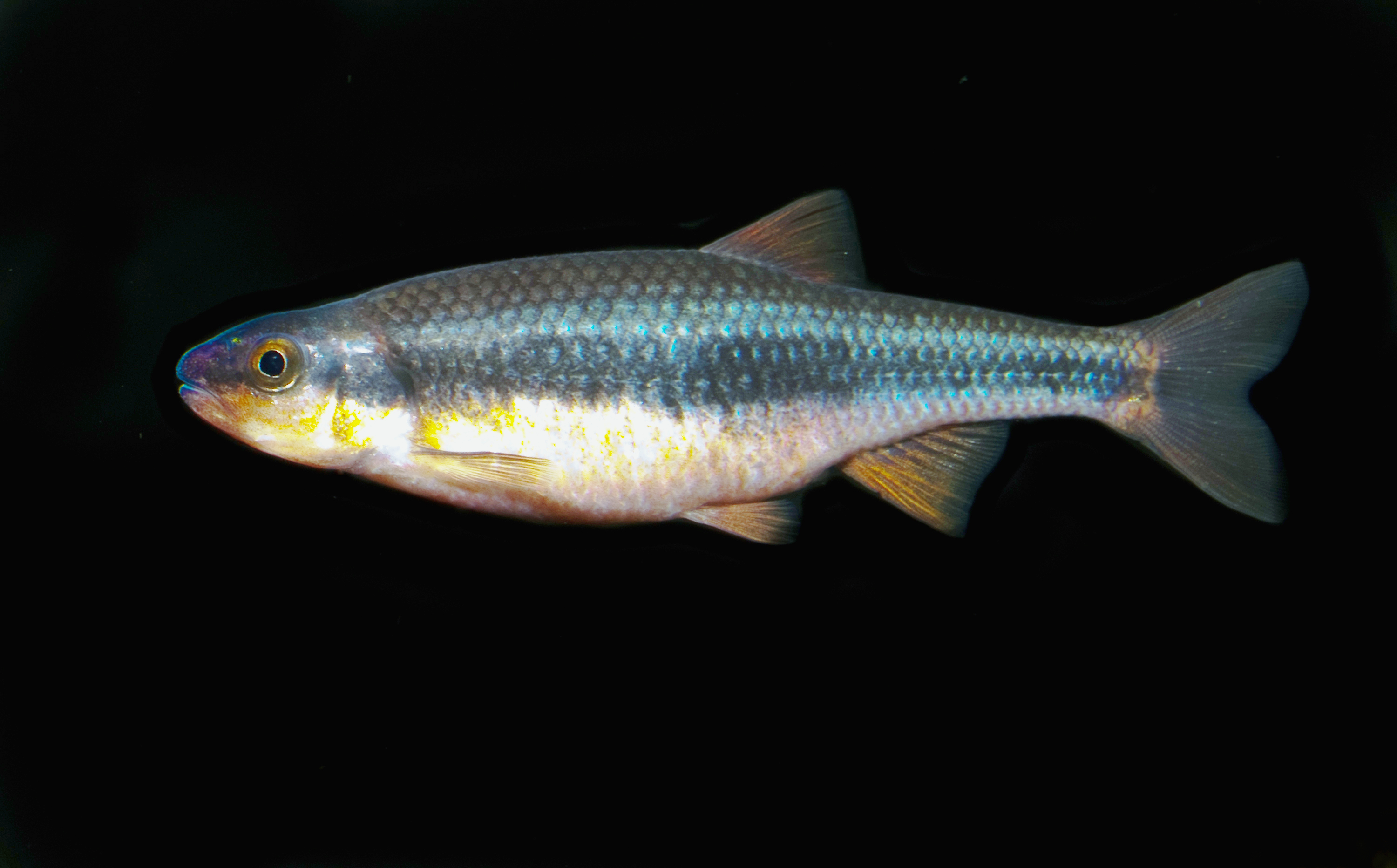

Conservation status
- Least Concern (IUCN 3.1)

Scientific classification
- Kingdom: Animalia
- Phylum: Chordata
- Class: Actinopterygii
- Division: Teleostei
- Order: Cypriniformes
- Family: Leuciscidae
- Subfamily: Pogonichthyinae
- Genus: Hydrophlox
- Species: H. lutipinnis

Binomial name
- Hydrophlox lutipinnis D. S. Jordan & Brayton, 1878

Synonyms
- Notropis lutipinnis (Jordan & Brayton, 1878)

= Yellowfin shiner =

Species of fish

The yellowfin shiner (Hydrophlox lutipinnis) is a species of freshwater ray-finned fishes belonging to the family Leuciscidae, the shiners, daces and minnows. It is native to the southeastern United States, where it occurs in North Carolina, South Carolina, and Georgia.
