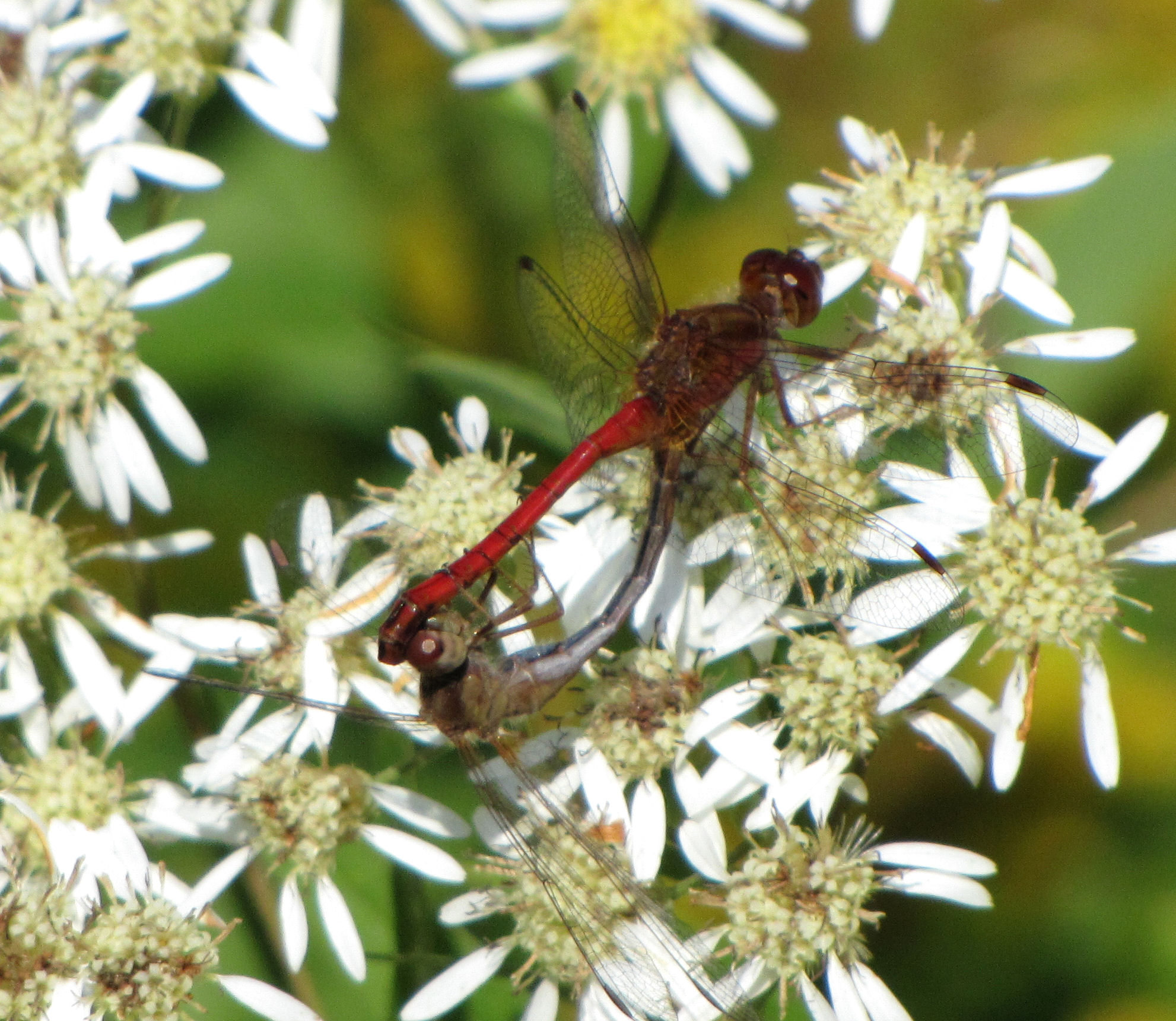
- Mating pair in wheel position, male on top

Conservation status
- Least Concern (IUCN 3.1)

Scientific classification
- Kingdom: Animalia
- Phylum: Arthropoda
- Class: Insecta
- Order: Odonata
- Infraorder: Anisoptera
- Family: Libellulidae
- Genus: Sympetrum
- Species: S. rubicundulum

Binomial name
- Sympetrum rubicundulum (Say, 1839)

= Sympetrum rubicundulum =

Species of dragonfly

Sympetrum rubicundulum, commonly known as the ruby meadowhawk, is a species of dragonfly of the family Libellulidae. It is found in northern United States and southern Ontario, Canada. Adult males are identifiable by a distinctive orange to brown face and red bodies. Females faces have same colours as males; bodies are brown to dark-red.

== Similar species ==
- Sympetrum internum – cherry-faced meadowhawk
- Sympetrum obtrusum – white-faced meadowhawk
- Sympetrum costiferum - saffron-winged meadowhawk
