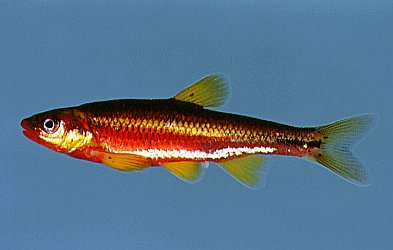
- Saffron shiner (Hydrophlox rubricroceus)

Scientific classification
- Kingdom: Animalia
- Phylum: Chordata
- Class: Actinopterygii
- Order: Cypriniformes
- Family: Leuciscidae
- Subfamily: Pogonichthyinae
- Genus: Hydrophlox; D. S. Jordan, 1878

Type species
- Hybopsis rubricroceus Cope, 1868

= Hydrophlox =

Genus of fishes

Hydrophlox is a genus of freshwater ray-finned fishes belonging to the family Leuciscidae, the shiners, daces and minnows. The fishes in this genus are found in North America.

== Species ==
Hydrophlox contains the following species:

- Hydrophlox chiliticus (Cope, 1870) (Redlip shiner)
- Hydrophlox chlorocephalus (Cope, 1870) (Greenhead shiner)
- Hydrophlox chrosomus (D. S. Jordan, 1877) (Rainbow shiner)
- Hydrophlox lutipinnis Jordan & Brayton, 1878 (Yellowfin shiner)
- Hydrophlox rubricroceus (Cope, 1868) (Saffron shiner)
