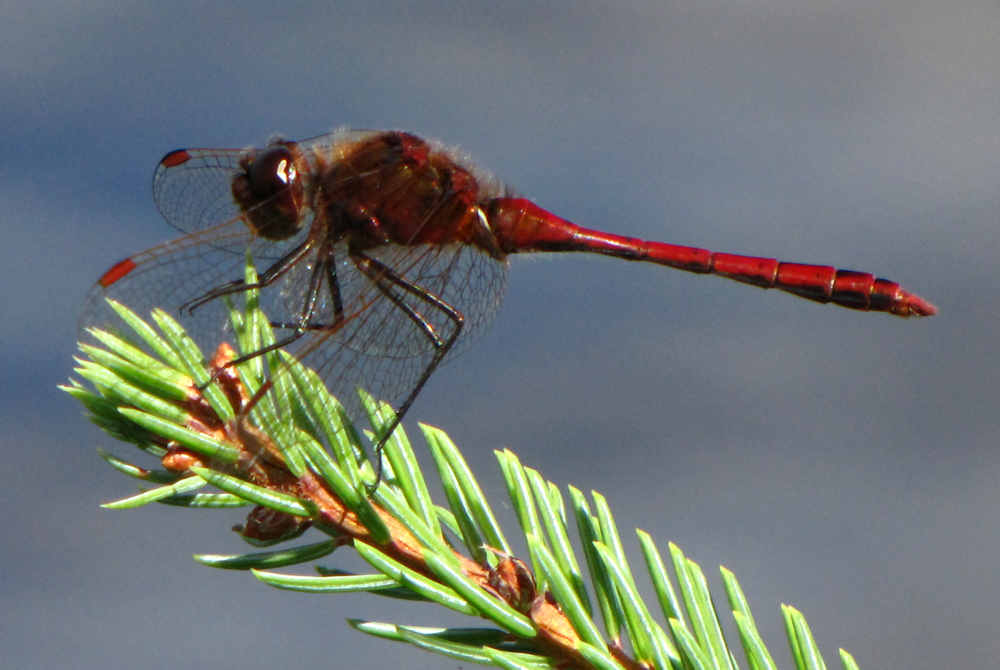
- Male, Temagami, Ontario

Conservation status
- Least Concern (IUCN 3.1)

Scientific classification
- Kingdom: Animalia
- Phylum: Arthropoda
- Class: Insecta
- Order: Odonata
- Infraorder: Anisoptera
- Family: Libellulidae
- Genus: Sympetrum
- Species: S. costiferum

Binomial name
- Sympetrum costiferum (Hagen, 1861)

= Sympetrum costiferum =

Species of dragonfly

Sympetrum costiferum, the saffron-winged meadowhawk, is a dragonfly of the genus Sympetrum. It is found across northern and central United States and most of Canada, including a southern portion of the Northwest Territories.

Its abdomen is yellowish-brown, turning pale red at maturity in both sexes. Juveniles and females have gold (saffron) coloured wing stripes. Veins of males and females are reddish or orange. The sides of the abdomen are marked with black triangles. Some females have amber in basal areas of their wings. Legs are striped in black and yellow or red. Size: 35 mm (1.4 in). This species overlaps with and is difficult to distinguish from both the ruby and white-faced meadowhawks.

== Similar species ==
- Sympetrum obtrusum – white-faced meadowhawk
- Sympetrum rubicundulum – ruby meadowhawk
- Sympetrum internum – cherry-faced meadowhawk
