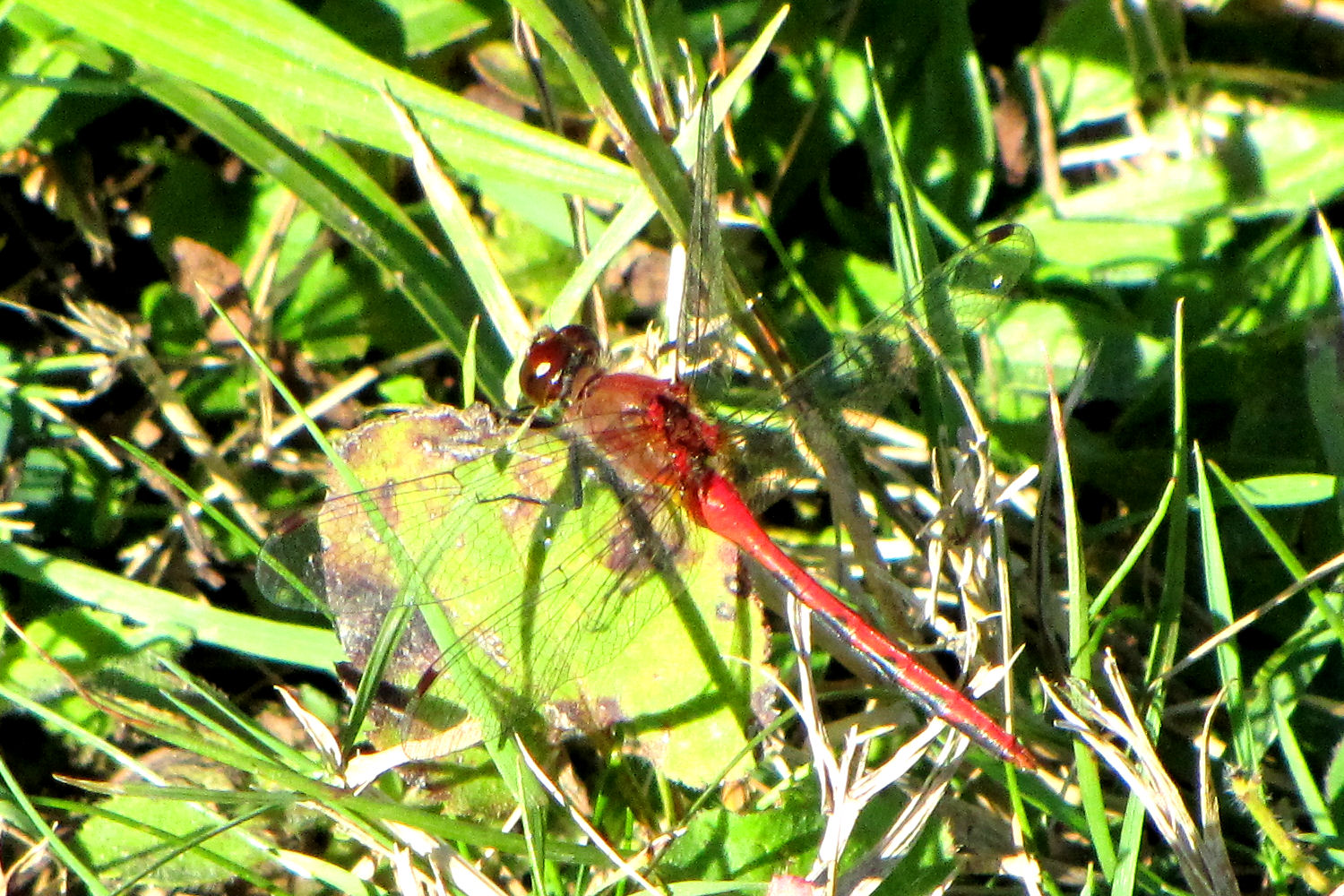
- Ottawa, Ontario, Canada

Conservation status
- Least Concern (IUCN 3.1)

Scientific classification
- Kingdom: Animalia
- Phylum: Arthropoda
- Clade: Pancrustacea
- Class: Insecta
- Order: Odonata
- Infraorder: Anisoptera
- Superfamily: Libelluloidea
- Family: Libellulidae
- Genus: Sympetrum
- Species: S. internum

Binomial name
- Sympetrum internum Montgomery, 1943

= Sympetrum internum =

Species of dragonfly

Sympetrum internum, the cherry-faced meadowhawk, is a dragonfly of the genus Sympetrum. It is found across northern and central United States and most of Canada, including southern portions of Yukon and the Northwest Territories. Its abdomen is brown, turning dark red at maturity in both sexes. The sides of the abdomen are marked with black triangles and the legs are black. Some females have amber in basal areas of their wings. As their name suggests, faces are dark red when mature. Size: 21–36 mm (0.83–1.42 in). This species overlaps with and is difficult to distinguish from the ruby, saffron-winged, and white-faced meadowhawks.

== Similar species ==
- Sympetrum costiferum – saffron-winged meadowhawk
- Sympetrum obtrusum – white-faced meadowhawk
- Sympetrum rubicundulum – ruby meadowhawk
