= Greenhead shiner =

Conservation status
- Least Concern (IUCN 3.1)

Scientific classification
- Kingdom: Animalia
- Phylum: Chordata
- Class: Actinopterygii
- Order: Cypriniformes
- Family: Leuciscidae
- Subfamily: Pogonichthyinae
- Genus: Hydrophlox
- Species: H. chlorocephalus

Binomial name
- Hydrophlox chlorocephalus (Cope, 1870)

Synonyms
- Hybopsis chlorocephalus Cope, 1870; Notropis chlorocephalus (Cope, 1870)

Species of fish

The greenhead shiner (Hydrophlox chlorocephalus) is a North American cyprinid fish, found in the Catawba River system or the Santee River drainage in North Carolina and South Carolina.
