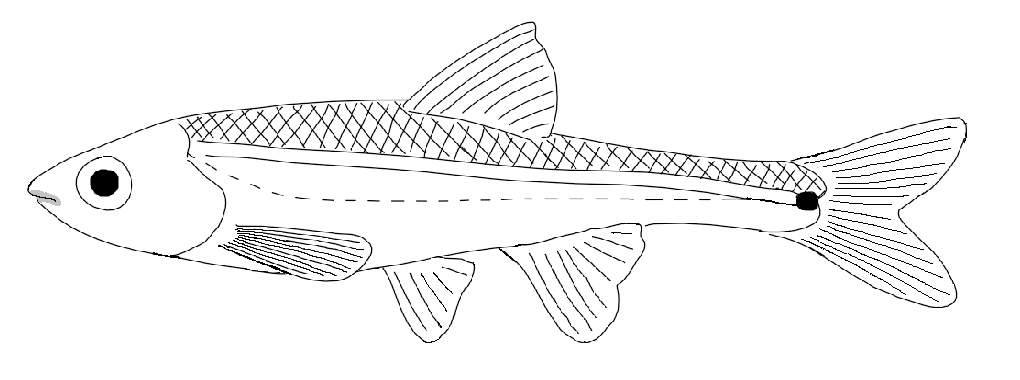

Conservation status
- Least Concern (IUCN 3.1)

Scientific classification
- Kingdom: Animalia
- Phylum: Chordata
- Class: Actinopterygii
- Order: Cypriniformes
- Family: Leuciscidae
- Subfamily: Pogonichthyinae
- Genus: Hydrophlox
- Species: H. chiliticus

Binomial name
- Hydrophlox chiliticus (Cope, 1870)

Synonyms
- Hybopsis chiliticus Cope, 1870; Notropis chiliticus (Cope, 1870)

= Redlip shiner =

Species of fish

The redlip shiner (Hydrophlox chiliticus) is a species of freshwater ray-finned fishes belonging to the family Leuciscidae, the shiners, daces and minnows. This shiner can be found in a few streams located in North Carolina, South Carolina, and Virginia. It inhabits rocky pools of clear headwaters, creeks and small rivers. Adults range in length from 40 to 55 mm (1.6 to 2.2 in).

== Description ==
The redlip shiner is characterized by bright red lips with a similar coloration in the dorsal, anal, and caudal fins. The body is slender and compressed, with the dorsal fin origin slightly behind pelvic fin origin. The muzzle is acuminate and greater than the interorbital width. The maxillary extends beyond anterior rim of orbit and the premaxillaries are opposite of the middle of the pupil. They have large eyes and a slightly subterminal mouth. The pharyngeal tooth count for the redlip shiner is 2, 4-4, 2. The length of the body, not including the caudal fin, is four times the length of the head and five and a half times the body depth. These shiners have around 34-37 lateral scales and seven rows of scales between the base of the dorsal fin and lateral line. There is also an average of 14-18 scales before the dorsal fin. The lateral line is strongly decurved and a thin golden band is present along its upper margin. A wider and silver band, located along the flank, stretches from the head and ends at a dark caudal spot. N. chiliticus usually have eight or nine anal rays.

An olivaceous color is dominant in redlip shiners, along with scattered black blotches on the side of the body. Mature males become very colorful during breeding season. They obtain a scarlet-red color in their eyes and on their underbelly, while their heads become a bright yellow-gold. Males' fins also become a bright yellow-gold color and the red of their lips seems more pronounced during this time.

== Habitat and distribution ==
The redlip shiner occupies flowing pools of clear headwaters, creeks, and small rivers of the Piedmont and Appalachian Mountains. It is believed to be established in the New River drainage and Cape Fear drainage in North Carolina and Virginia. This shiner has a very limited distribution in South Carolina, which is the southernmost extreme portion of its range. It is thought that Notropis chiliticus, along with several other Notropis species, might have been introduced in areas such as the PeeDee drainage. Though this is a possibility, the historical absence of redlip shiners in these areas may be due to inadequate sampling.

N. chiliticus prefers cold to cool water temperatures and areas with sand-gravel or rubble bottom.

== Behavior and reproduction ==
The redlip shiner breeds at 53 to 62 °F (12 to 17 °C). Males will aggregate over nests of Nocomis leptocephalus. The female initiates spawning by swimming over a nest until she is pursued. The nest is built in small pits and once the male drives the female to the nest, clasping occurs. Near these functional nests are artificial nests that are not used by the fish. This suggests that the presence of live Nocomis leptocephalus is attractive to N. chiliticus. This behavior towards Nocomis has also been observed in other species of Notropis. Redlip shiners reach maturity in 1 to 2 years and spawn around the month of May.

N. chiliticus are often found in groups of a dozen or more in the middle of the water column. They are often mixed with Luxilus cerasinus and other minnows.
