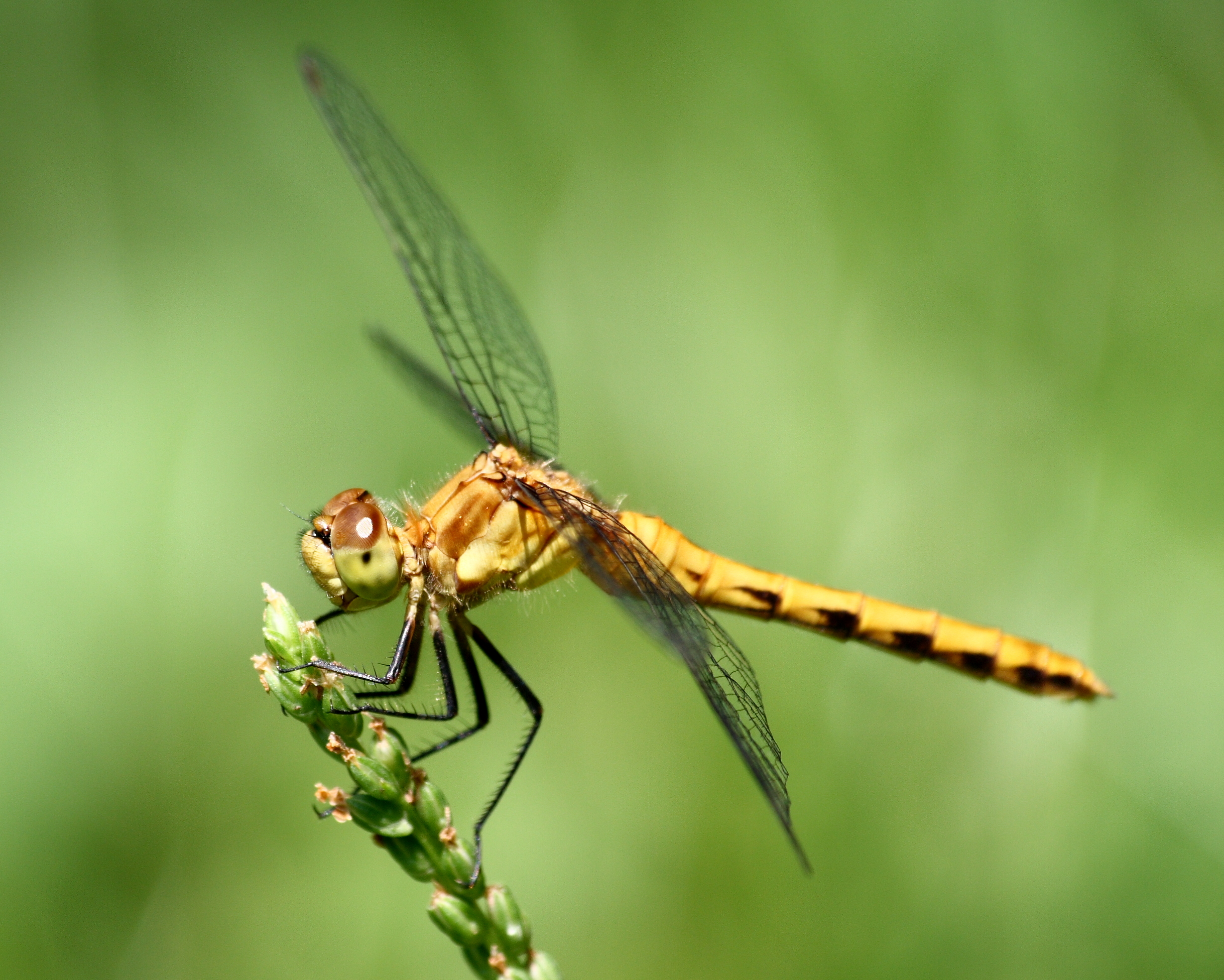
- Immature female, central Connecticut
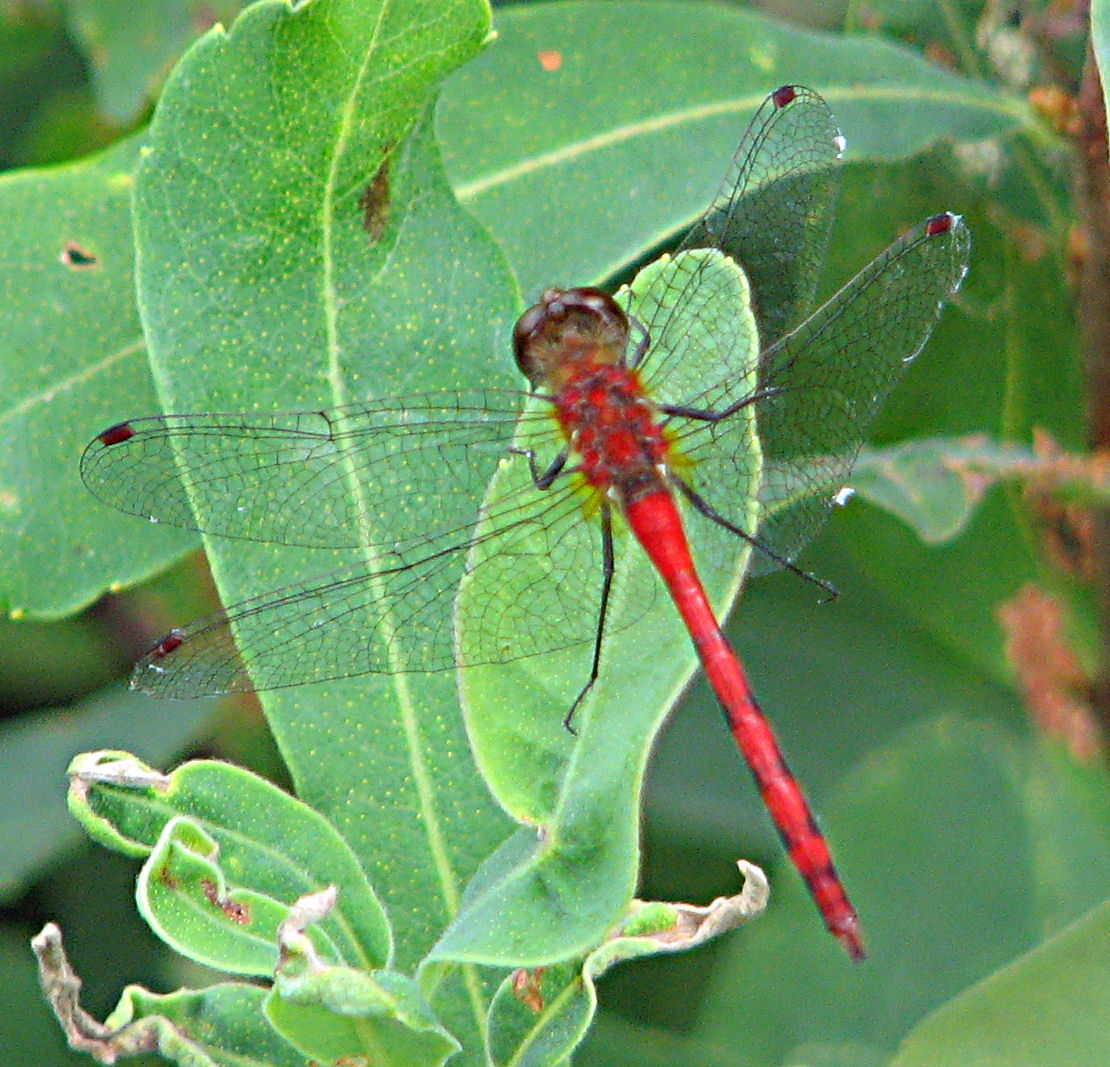
- Mature male, Temagami, Ontario

Conservation status
- Least Concern (IUCN 3.1)

Scientific classification
- Kingdom: Animalia
- Phylum: Arthropoda
- Class: Insecta
- Order: Odonata
- Infraorder: Anisoptera
- Family: Libellulidae
- Genus: Sympetrum
- Species: S. obtrusum

Binomial name
- Sympetrum obtrusum (Hagen, 1867)

= White-faced meadowhawk =

Species of dragonfly

The white-faced meadowhawk (Sympetrum obtrusum) is a dragonfly of the genus Sympetrum. It is found in the northern United States and southern Canada. Adult males are identifiable by a distinctive pure white face and red bodies. However, females are usually yellowish or brown.

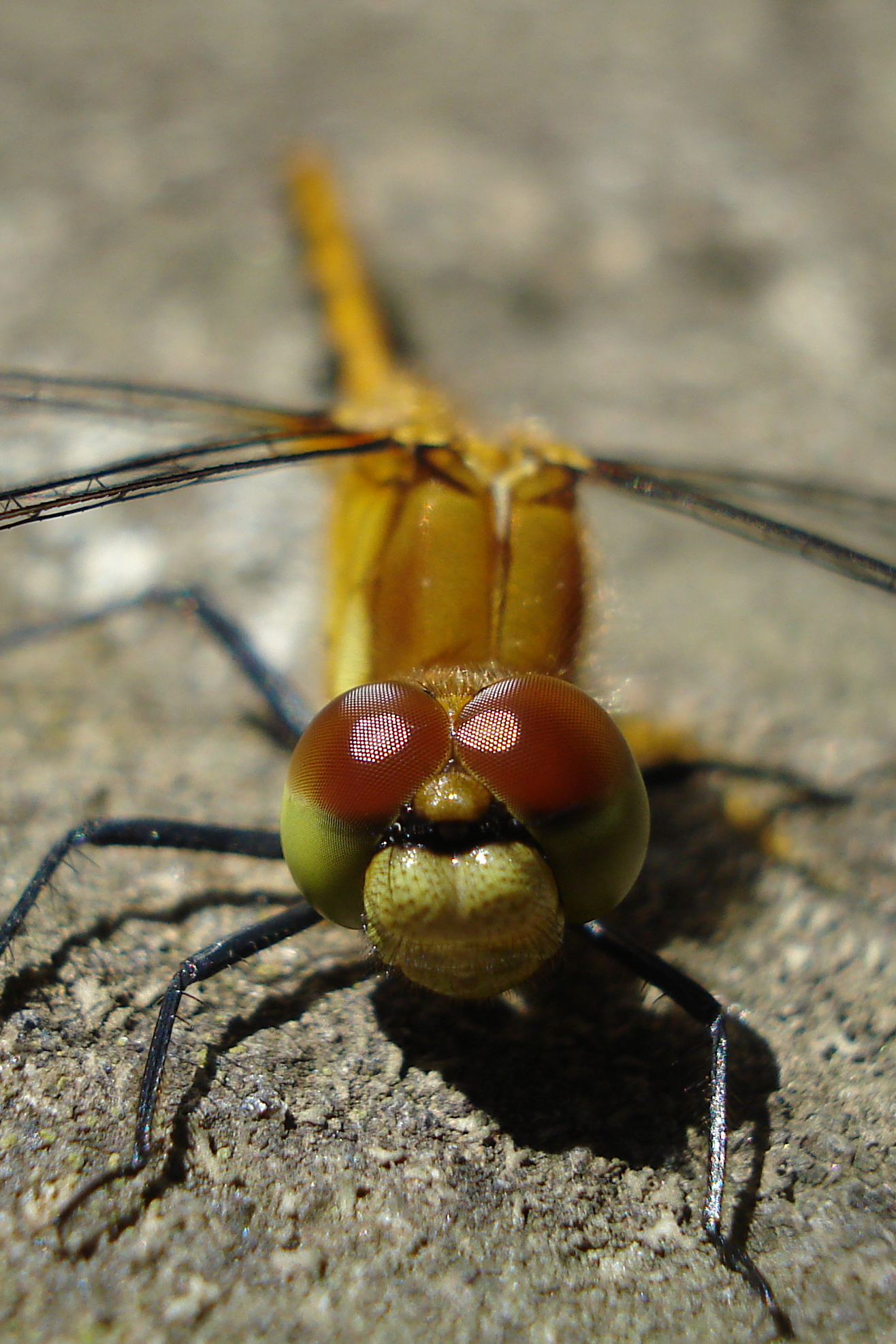
Female white-faced meadowhawk (Sympetrum obtrusum)

== Similar species ==
Juvenile white-faced meadowhawks are almost indistinguishable from the ruby and cherry-faced meadowhawks. The three species habitats also overlap extensively. White-faces can be identified by having white faces, as the name implies, at maturity.

- Sympetrum internum – cherry-faced meadowhawk
- Sympetrum rubicundulum – ruby meadowhawk
