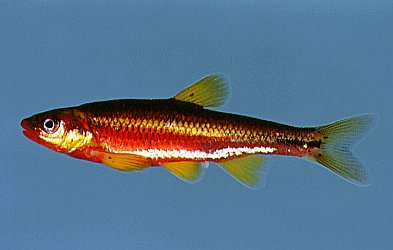

Conservation status
- Least Concern (IUCN 3.1)

Scientific classification
- Kingdom: Animalia
- Phylum: Chordata
- Class: Actinopterygii
- Division: Teleostei
- Order: Cypriniformes
- Family: Leuciscidae
- Subfamily: Pogonichthyinae
- Genus: Hydrophlox
- Species: H. rubricroceus

Binomial name
- Hydrophlox rubricroceus (Cope, 1868)

Synonyms
- Hybopsis rubricroceus Cope, 1878; Notropis rubricroceus (Cope, 1868)

= Saffron shiner =

Species of fish

The saffron shiner (Hydrophlox rubricroceus) is a species of freshwater ray-finned fishes belonging to the family Leuciscidae, the shiners, daces and minnows. It is found in cold, clear rocky streams and creeks in the Tennessee River drainage. Characteristics are a relatively deep body, dorsal fin origin above back half of pelvic fin base, medium-sized eye, narrow rounded snout, sub-terminal mouth, elongate spot at base of tail fin, dark side stripe on back half of body, olive back, silver sides, white belly, fins pale except for black mark on tail fin, and breeding males will be bright red with blue stripe on the side. The adults grow to between 40–60 millimetres (1.6–2.4 in) in length and mature to reproductive status in one to two years. When spawning the females release approximately 440 to 1200 eggs and they either spawn over a chub nest or in gravel runs without a nest. Food sources for saffron shiners consist of insects, worms, spiders, plants and algae.
